= Robbins Airport =

Robbins Airport may refer to:

- Robbins Airport (Illinois), closed airport in Robbins, Illinois
- Robbins Airport (Massachusetts), closed airport in Danvers, Massachusetts
- Robbins Airport (Wyoming), private airfield in Medicine Bow, Wyoming
- Robbins Field, public use airport in Oneonta, Alabama
