= Blackwell Field =

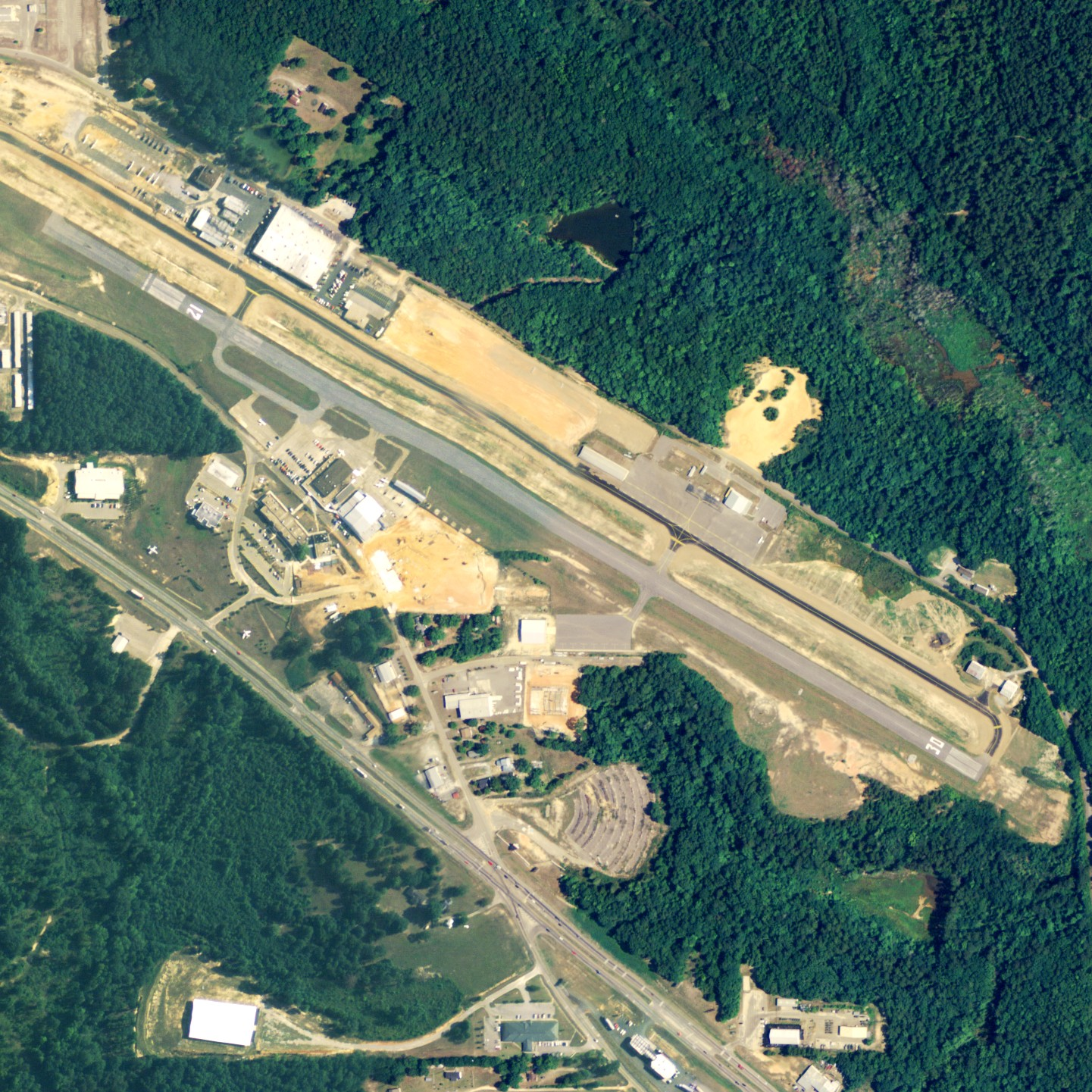
- NAIP aerial image, 2006
- IATA: none; ICAO: none; FAA LID: 71J

Summary
- Owner: Town of Ozark
- Serves: Ozark, Alabama
- Elevation AMSL: 356 ft (109 m)
- Coordinates: 31°25′55″N 085°37′14″W
- Interactive map of Blackwell Field

Runways
Direction	Length		Surface
Direction	ft	m	Surface
13/31	5,152	1,570	Asphalt

Statistics (2010)
- Aircraft operations: 91,500
- Based aircraft: 26
- Source: Federal Aviation Administration

Blackwell Field (FAA LID: 71J) is a public-use airport located two nautical miles (2.3 mi; 3.7 km) southeast of the central business district of Ozark, in Dale County, Alabama, United States. The airport is owned by the Town of Ozark. It is included in the FAA's National Plan of Integrated Airport Systems for 2011–2015, which categorized it as a general aviation facility.

== Facilities and aircraft ==
Blackwell Field covers an area of 114 acres (46 ha) at an elevation of 356 feet (109 m) above mean sea level. It has one runway designated 13/31 with an asphalt surface measuring 5,152 by 80 feet (1,570 by 24 m).

For the 12-month period ending March 4, 2010, the airport had 91,500 general aviation aircraft operations, an average of 250 per day. At that time there were 26 aircraft based at this airport: 58% single-engine, 15% multi-engine, 4% jet and 23% helicopter.

== See also ==
- List of airports in Alabama
