= Ardmore Airport =

Ardmore Airport may refer to:

- Ardmore Airport (New Zealand) in Manurewa, Auckland, New Zealand (IATA: AMZ)
- Ardmore Airport (Alabama) in Ardmore, Alabama, United States (FAA: 1M3)
- Ardmore Downtown Executive Airport in Ardmore, Oklahoma, United States (FAA: 1F0)
- Ardmore Municipal Airport in Ardmore, Oklahoma, United States (FAA: ADM)
  - Ardmore Air Force Base, a former military airport located there
  - Ardmore Army Air Field, an earlier name of the military airport
