= Butler–Choctaw County Airport =

Airport in Alabama, United States

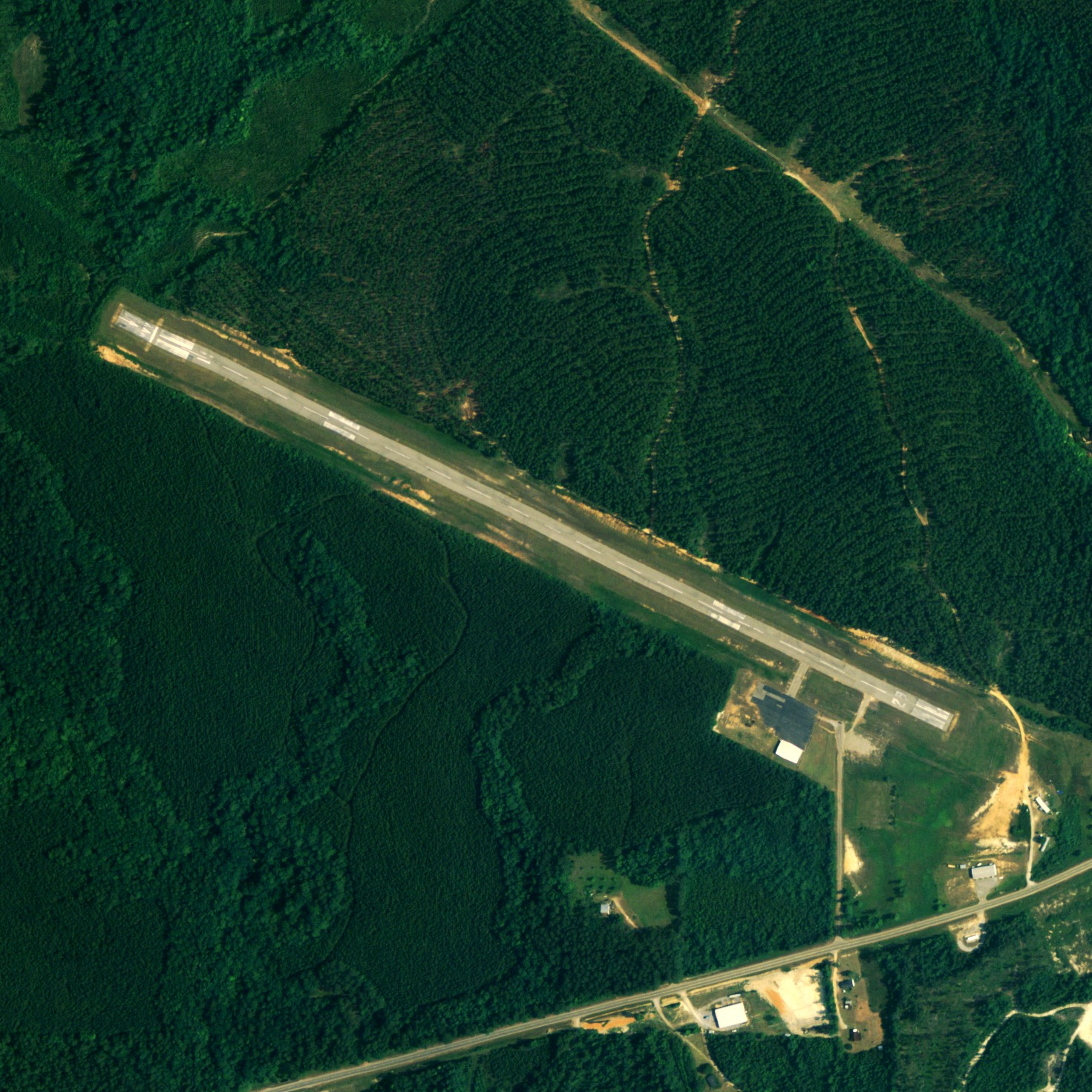
- NAIP aerial image, 23 June 2006
- IATA: none; ICAO: none; FAA LID: 09A

Summary
- Airport type: Public
- Owner: Choctaw County Airport Authority
- Serves: Butler, Alabama
- Elevation AMSL: 134 ft (41 m)
- Coordinates: 32°07′10″N 088°07′39″W

Map
- Location of airport in Alabama 09A (the United States)

Runways
Direction	Length		Surface
Direction	ft	m	Surface
12/30	4,082	1,244	Asphalt

Statistics (2022)
- Aircraft operations (2019): 1,920
- Based aircraft: 0
- Source: Federal Aviation Administration

Butler–Choctaw County Airport (FAA LID: 09A) is a city-owned public-use airport located 5 nautical miles (9 km) northeast of the central business district of Butler, a city in Choctaw County, Alabama, United States. According to the FAA's National Plan of Integrated Airport Systems for 2009–2013, it is categorized as a general aviation facility.

== Facilities and aircraft ==
Butler–Choctaw County Airport covers an area of 80 acres (0.13 sq mi; 0.32 km^{2}) which contains one runway designated 11/29 is 4,080 x 80 feet (1,244 x 24 meters) asphalt pavement. For the 12-month period ending March 27, 2000, the airport had 1,920 general aviation aircraft operations.

== See also ==
- List of airports in Alabama
