= Abbeville Municipal Airport =

Airport in Alabama, United States

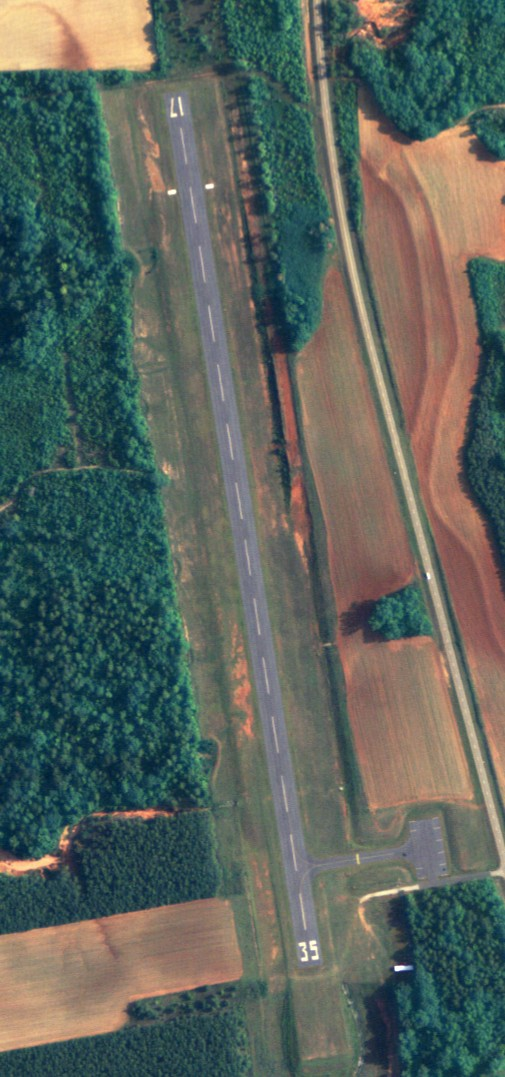
- NAIP aerial image, 24 June 2006
- IATA: none; ICAO: none; FAA LID: 0J0

Summary
- Airport type: Public
- Owner: City of Abbeville
- Serves: Abbeville, Alabama
- Elevation AMSL: 468 ft (143 m)
- Coordinates: 31°36′01″N 085°14′17″W
- Interactive map of Abbeville Municipal Airport

Runways
Direction	Length		Surface
Direction	ft	m	Surface
17/35	2,900	884	Asphalt

Statistics (2017)
- Aircraft operations (2016): 1600
- Based aircraft: 1
- Source: Federal Aviation Administration

Abbeville Municipal Airport (FAA LID: 0J0) is a city-owned, public-use airport located three nautical miles (6 km) north of the central business district of Abbeville, a city in Henry County, Alabama, United States. It is the only airport that serves the city of Abbeville.

This airport is included in the FAA's National Plan of Integrated Airport Systems for 2011–2015 and 2009–2013, both of which categorized it as a general aviation facility.

== History ==
Abbeville Municipal Airport was officially activated by the FAA in August 1959.

In 2019, the airport was renamed in honor of US Senator Richard Shelby. At the same time, it received $200,000 for runway rehabilitation.

== Facilities and aircraft ==
Abbeville Municipal Airport covers an area of 36 acres (15 ha) at an elevation of 468 feet (143 m) above mean sea level. It has one runway designated 17/35 with an asphalt surface measuring 2,915 by 80 feet (888 x 24 m). For the 12-month period ending November 11, 2009, the airport had 1,600 aircraft operations, an average of 133 per month: 75% military and 25% general aviation.

== See also ==
- List of airports in Alabama
