= Roanoke Airport =

Roanoke Airport may refer to:

- Roanoke Regional Airport serving Roanoke, Virginia, United States (FAA/IATA:ROA)
- Roanoke Municipal Airport in Roanoke, Alabama, United States (FAA: 7A5)

Airports in places named Roanoke:

- Northwest Regional Airport (Texas) in Roanoke, Texas, United States (FAA: 52F)
