= George Downer Airport =

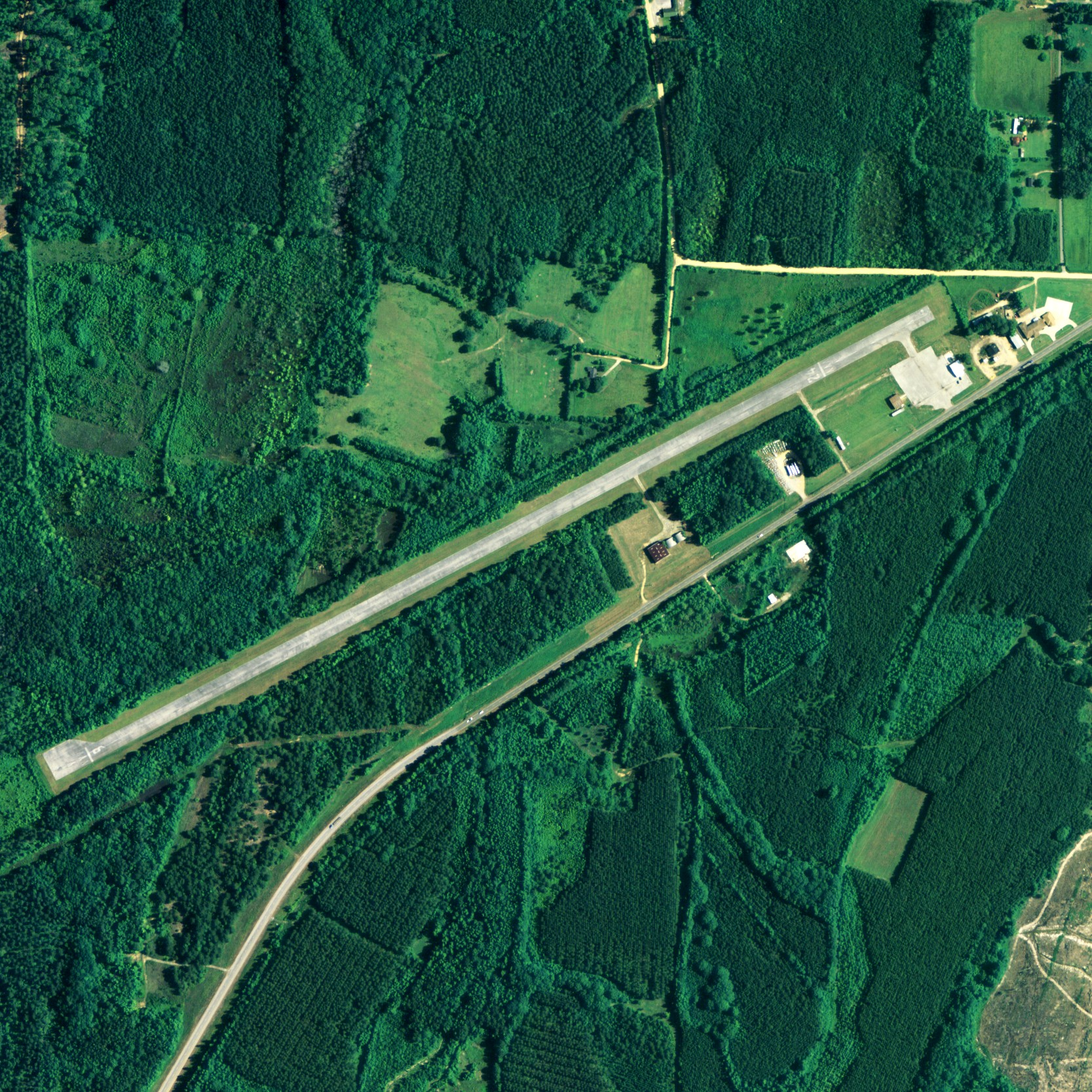
- NAIP aerial image, 21 June 2006
- IATA: AIV; ICAO: KAIV; FAA LID: AIV

Summary
- Airport type: Public
- Owner: City of Aliceville
- Serves: Aliceville, Alabama
- Elevation AMSL: 150 ft (46 m)
- Coordinates: 33°06′23″N 088°11′52″W

Map
- Location of airport in Alabama AIV (the United States)

Runways
Direction	Length		Surface
Direction	ft	m	Surface
6/24	5,001	1,524	Asphalt

Statistics (2017)
- Aircraft operations (2016): 5,400
- Based aircraft: 6
- Source: Federal Aviation Administration

George Downer Airport (IATA: AIV, ICAO: KAIV, FAA LID: AIV) is a city-owned, public-use airport located two nautical miles (4 km) southwest of the central business district of Aliceville, a city in Pickens County, Alabama, United States.

This airport is included in the FAA's National Plan of Integrated Airport Systems for 2011–2015 and 2009–2013, both of which categorized it as a general aviation facility.

== Facilities and aircraft ==
George Downer Airport covers an area of 41 acres (17 ha) at an elevation of 150 feet (46 m) above mean sea level. It has one runway designated 6/24 with an asphalt surface measuring 4,970 by 80 feet (1,515 x 24 m). For the 12-month period ending July 26, 2006, the airport had 5,400 general aviation aircraft operations, an average of 14 per day.

== See also ==
- List of airports in Alabama
