= Clayton Municipal Airport (Alabama) =

Airport in Alabama, United States

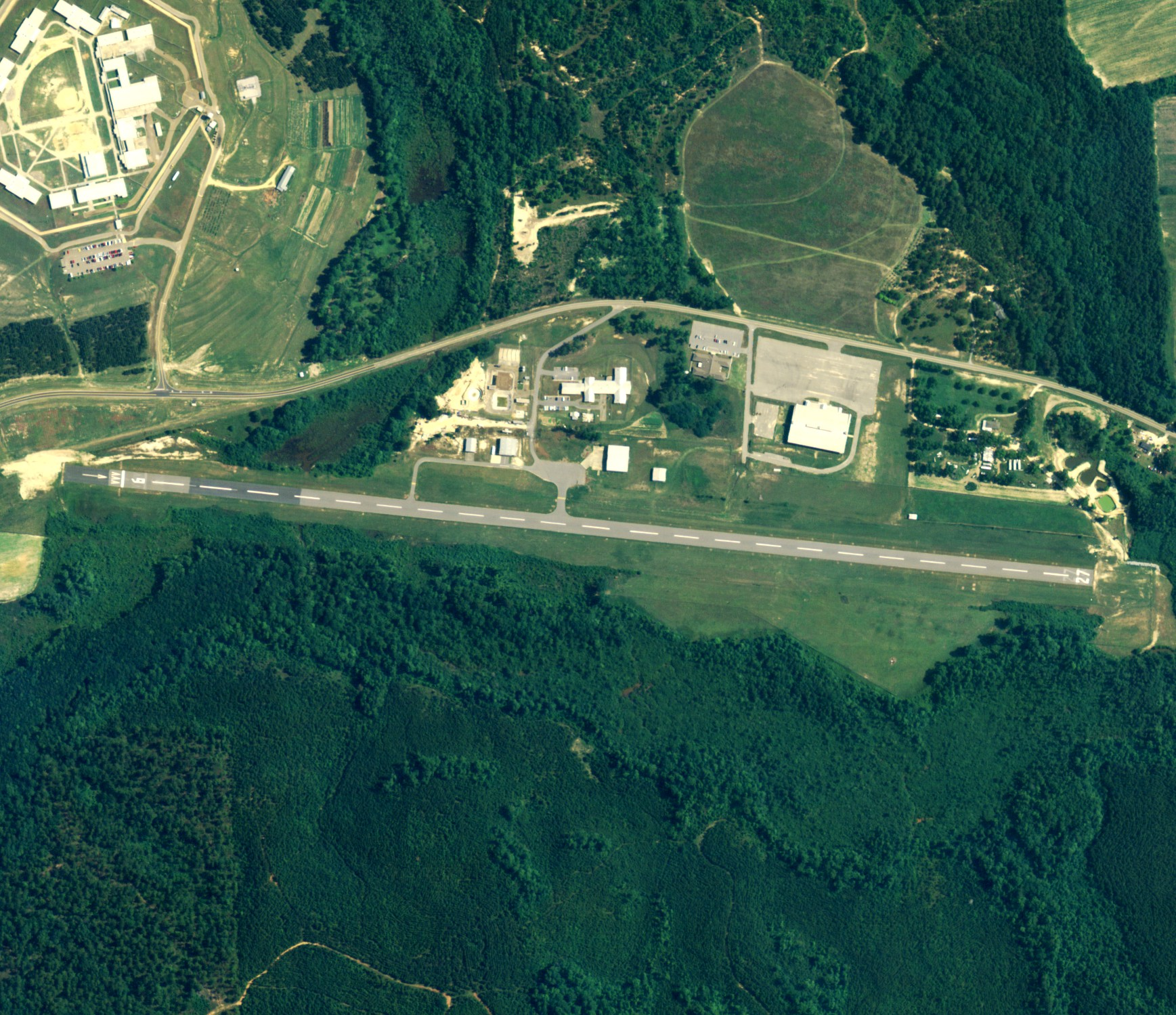
- NAIP aerial image, 30 June 2006
- IATA: none; ICAO: none; FAA LID: 11A

Summary
- Airport type: Public
- Owner: City of Clayton
- Serves: Clayton, Alabama
- Elevation AMSL: 435 ft (133 m)
- Coordinates: 31°53′00″N 085°29′07″W
- Interactive map of Clayton Municipal Airport

Runways
Direction	Length		Surface
Direction	ft	m	Surface
10/28	5,010	1,527	Asphalt

Statistics (2020)
- Aircraft operations (year ending 2/7/2020): 1,560
- Based aircraft: 1
- Source: Federal Aviation Administration

Clayton Municipal Airport (FAA LID: 11A) is a city-owned, public-use airport located two nautical miles (4 km) west of the central business district of Clayton, a city in Barbour County, Alabama, United States.

This airport is included in the FAA's National Plan of Integrated Airport Systems for 2011–2015 and 2009–2013, both of which categorized it as a general aviation facility.

== Facilities and aircraft ==
Clayton Municipal Airport covers an area of 56 acres (23 ha) at an elevation of 435 feet (133 m) above mean sea level. It has one runway designated 10/28 with an asphalt surface measuring 5,010 by 80 feet (1,527 x 24 m).

For the 12-month period ending February 7, 2020, the airport had 1,560 general aviation aircraft operations, an average of 30 per week.

== See also ==
- List of airports in Alabama
