= M95 (disambiguation) =

Messier 95 is a galaxy in the constellation Leo.

M95 or M-95 may also refer to:

== Military ==
- M-95 Degman, a tank
- Steyr-Mannlicher M1895, an Austro-Hungarian rifle
- M.95, a Dutch rifle
- Barrett M95, sniper rifle
- RK 95 TP, a Finnish assault rifle known commercially as M95

== Other uses ==
- Haplogroup O-M95 (Y-DNA), a high-frequency subclass of haplogroup O-K18
- M-95 (Michigan highway), a state highway in Michigan
- M 95, an age group for Masters athletics (athletes aged 35+)
- Richard Arthur Field (FAA LID: M95)
