= Roy E. Ray Airport =

Airport in Alabama, United States

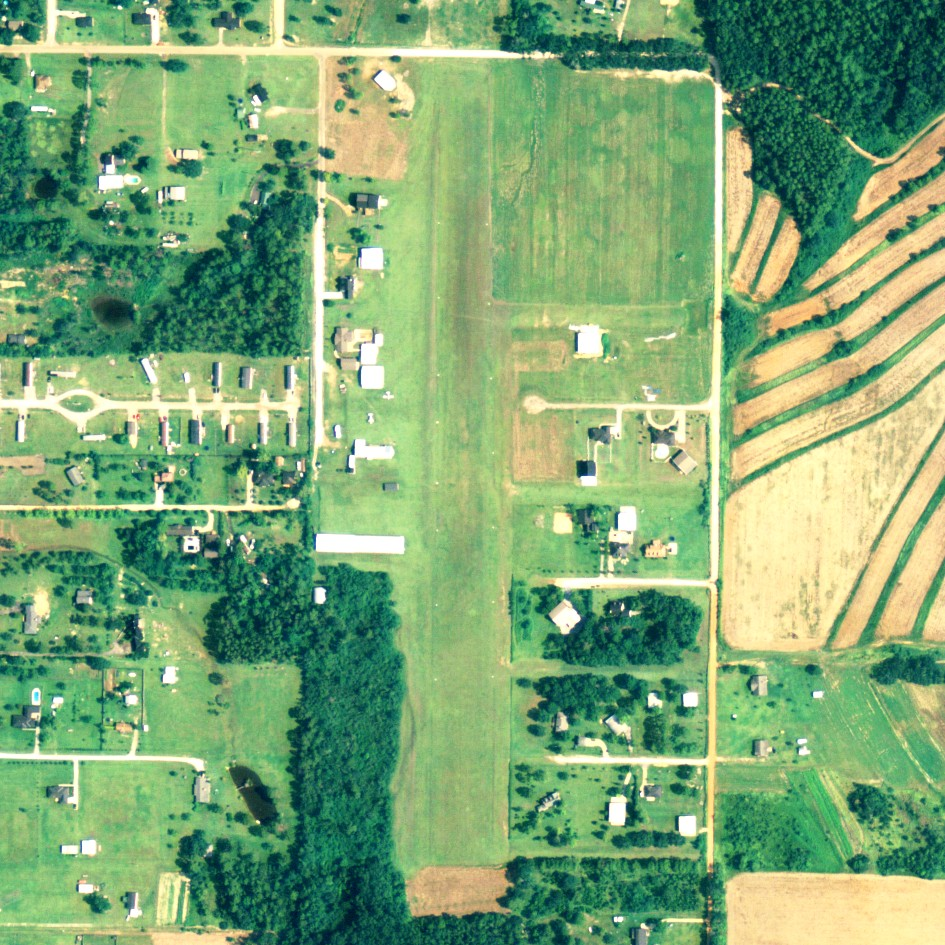
- NAIP aerial image, 20 August 2006
- IATA: none; ICAO: none; FAA LID: 5R7

Summary
- Airport type: Public
- Owner: Hillery W. Grice
- Serves: Bayou La Batre, Alabama
- Elevation AMSL: 87 ft / 27 m
- Coordinates: 30°27′19″N 088°12′40″W

Map
- Location of airport in Alabama 5R7 (the United States)

Runways
Direction	Length		Surface
Direction	ft	m	Surface
18/36	2,000	610	Turf

Statistics (2017)
- Aircraft operations (2016): 6,978
- Based aircraft: 35
- Source: Federal Aviation Administration

Roy E. Ray Airport (FAA LID: 5R7) is a privately owned, public-use airport located three nautical miles (4 mi, 6 km) northeast of the central business district of Bayou La Batre, a city in Mobile County, Alabama, United States.

== Facilities and aircraft ==
Roy E. Ray Airport covers an area of 41 acres (17 ha) at an elevation of 87 feet (27 m) above mean sea level. It has one runway designated 18/36 with a turf surface measuring 2,000 by 150 feet (610 x 46 m).

For the 12-month period ending May 12, 2011, the airport had 6,978 aircraft operations, an average of 19 per day. At that time there were 35 aircraft based at this airport: 91% single-engine, 6% multi-engine and 3% ultralight.

== See also ==
- List of airports in Alabama
