= Russellville Municipal Airport =

Airport in Alabama, United States

Russellville Municipal Airport Bill Pugh Field
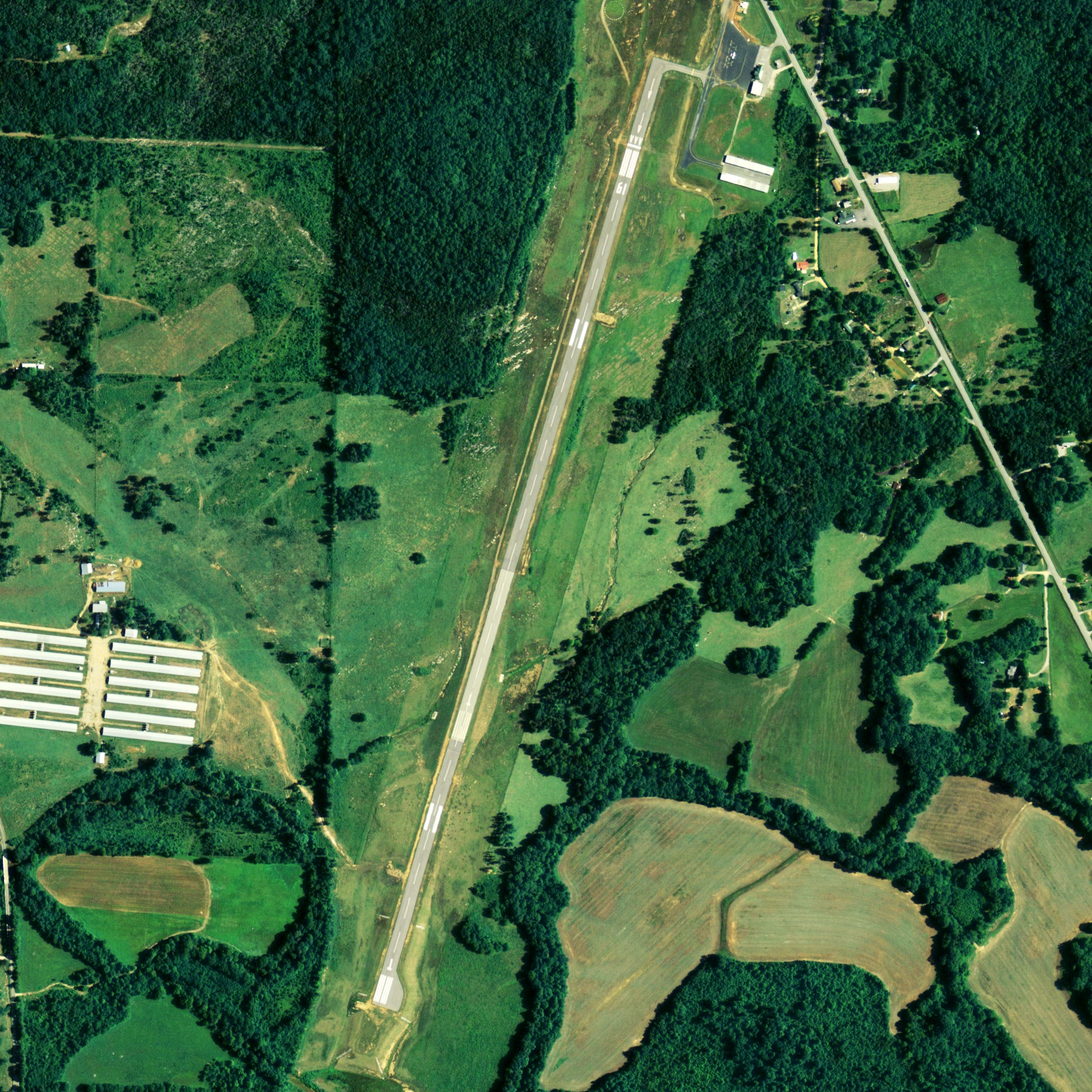
- NAIP aerial image, 2006
- IATA: none; ICAO: none; FAA LID: M22

Summary
- Airport type: Public
- Owner: City of Russellville
- Serves: Russellville, Alabama
- Elevation AMSL: 723 ft (220 m)
- Coordinates: 34°26′42″N 087°42′42″W
- Website: RussellvilleAL.org/...
- Interactive map of Russellville Municipal Airport

Runways
Direction	Length		Surface
Direction	ft	m	Surface
2/20	5,500	1,676	Asphalt

Statistics (2010)
- Aircraft operations: 20,125
- Based aircraft: 14
- Source: Federal Aviation Administration

Russellville Municipal Airport (FAA LID: M22), also known as Bill Pugh Field, is a city-owned public-use airport located three nautical miles (3.5 mi; 5.6 km) southeast of the central business district of Russellville, a city in Franklin County, Alabama, United States. It is included in the FAA's National Plan of Integrated Airport Systems for 2011–2015, which categorized it as a general aviation facility.

== Facilities and aircraft ==
The airport covers an area of 177 acres (72 ha) at an elevation of 723 feet (220 m) above mean sea level. It has one runway designated 2/20 with an asphalt surface measuring 5,500 by 75 feet (1,676 by 23 m).

For the 12-month period ending April 14, 2010, the airport had 20,125 general aviation aircraft operations, an average of 55 per day. At that time there were 14 aircraft based at this airport: 93% single-engine and 7% helicopter.

== See also ==
- List of airports in Alabama
