= North Pickens Airport =

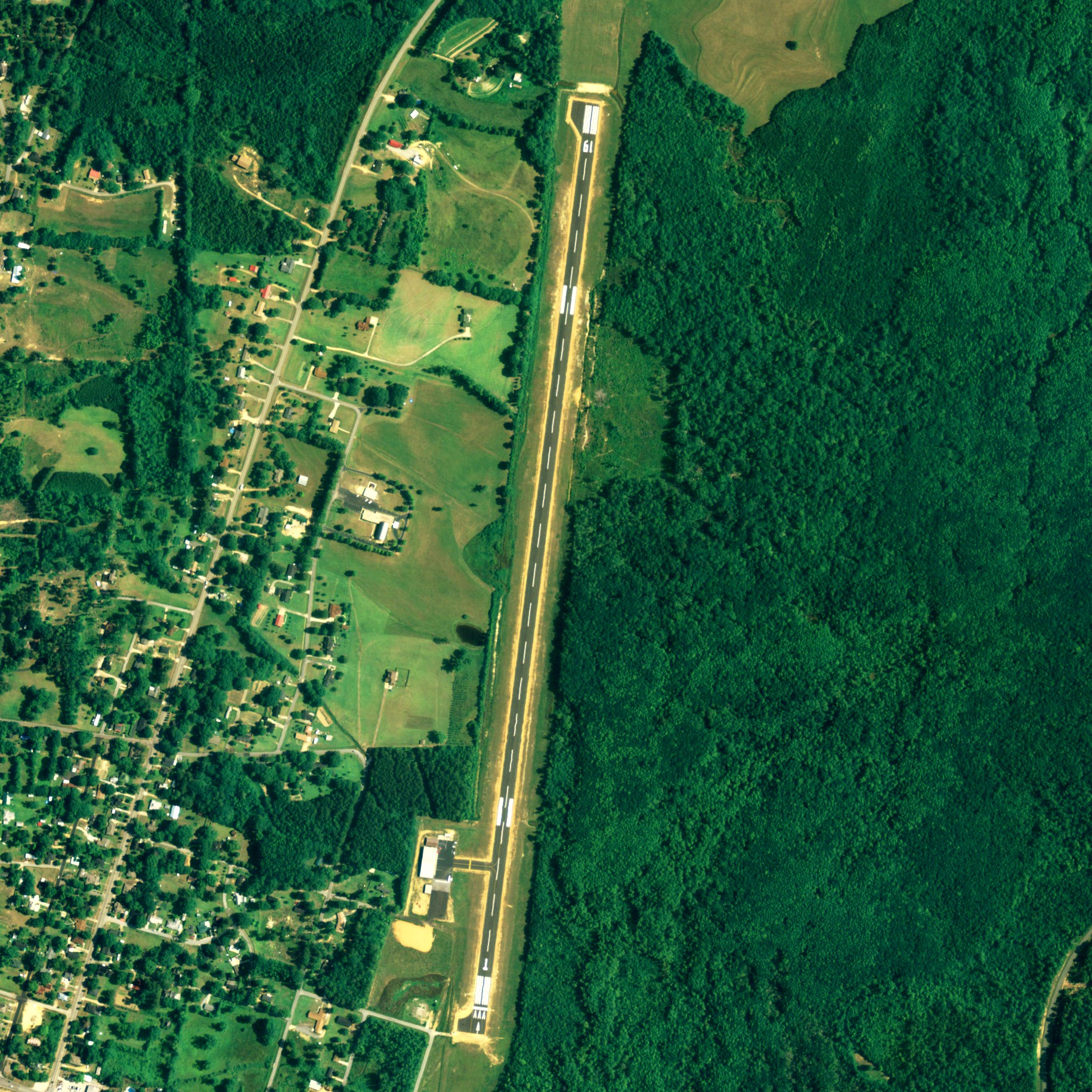
- NAIP aerial image, 2006
- IATA: none; ICAO: none; FAA LID: 3M8

Summary
- Airport type: Public
- Owner: Pickens County Commission
- Serves: Pickens County, Alabama
- Location: Reform, Alabama
- Elevation AMSL: 237 ft / 72 m
- Coordinates: 33°23′12″N 088°00′24″W

Map
- Location of airport in Alabama 3M8 (the United States)

Runways
Direction	Length		Surface
Direction	ft	m	Surface
1/19	5,144	1,568	Asphalt

Statistics (2009)
- Aircraft operations: 3,466
- Based aircraft: 11
- Source: Federal Aviation Administration

North Pickens Airport (FAA LID: 3M8) is a county-owned public-use airport in Pickens County, Alabama, United States. It is located one nautical mile (1.2 mi; 1.9 km) north of the central business district of Reform, Alabama. The airport is included in the FAA's National Plan of Integrated Airport Systems for 2011–2015, which categorized it as a general aviation facility.

== Facilities and aircraft ==
North Pickens Airport covers an area of 64 acres (26 ha) at an elevation of 237 feet (72 m) above mean sea level. It has one runway designated 1/19 with an asphalt surface measuring 5,144 by 80 feet (1,568 by 24 m).

For the 12-month period ending November 2, 2009, the airport had 3,466 general aviation aircraft operations, an average of 288 per month. At that time there were 11 aircraft based at this airport: 64% single-engine, 18% multi-engine and 18% jet.

== See also ==
- List of airports in Alabama
