= Morgan County Airport =

Morgan County Airport may refer to:

- Morgan County Airport (Ohio) in Morgan County, Ohio, United States (FAA: I71)
- Morgan County Airport (Utah) in Morgan County, Utah, United States (FAA: 42U)
- Hartselle-Morgan County Regional Airport in Morgan County, Alabama, United States (FAA: 5M0)
