= Moontown, Alabama =

- Unincorporated community
- Location within Alabama Location within the United States
- Coordinates: 34°44′00″N 86°27′25″W
- Country: United States
- State: Alabama
- County: Madison
- Elevation: 640 ft (200 m)
- Time zone: UTC-6 (Central (CST))
  - Summer (DST): UTC-5 (CDT)

Moontown is an unincorporated community in Madison County, Alabama, United States. It contains the Moontown Airport.
