= Folsom Field (disambiguation) =

Folsom Field may refer to:

- Folsom Field, an outdoor football stadium in Boulder, Colorado, United States
- Folsom Field (Alabama), an airport serving Cullman, Alabama, United States (FAA: 3A1)
- Carl Folsom Airport, an airport serving Elba, Alabama, United States (FAA: 14J)
