= Headland Municipal Airport =

Airport in Alabama, United States

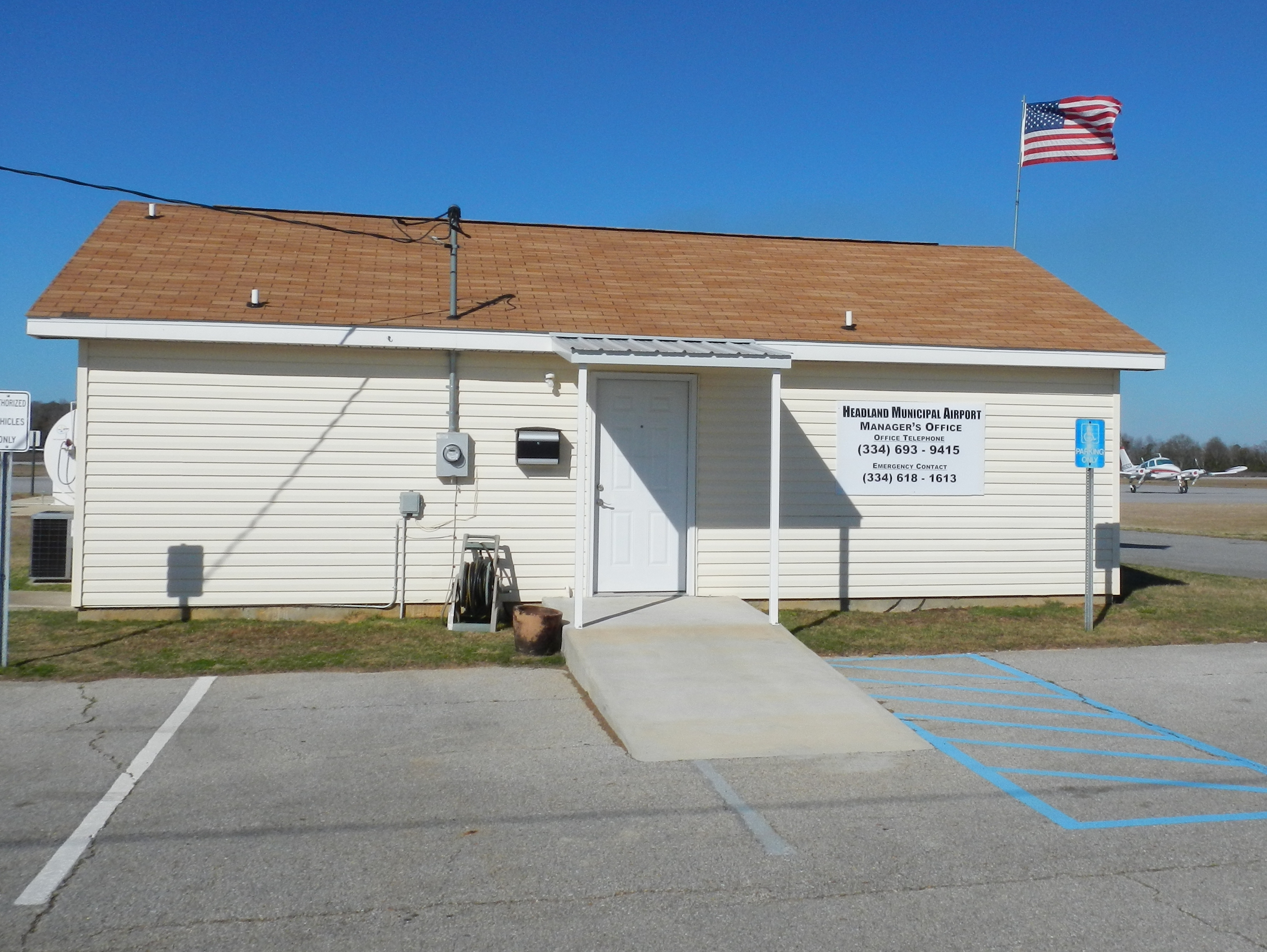
- Headland Municipal Airport in 2012

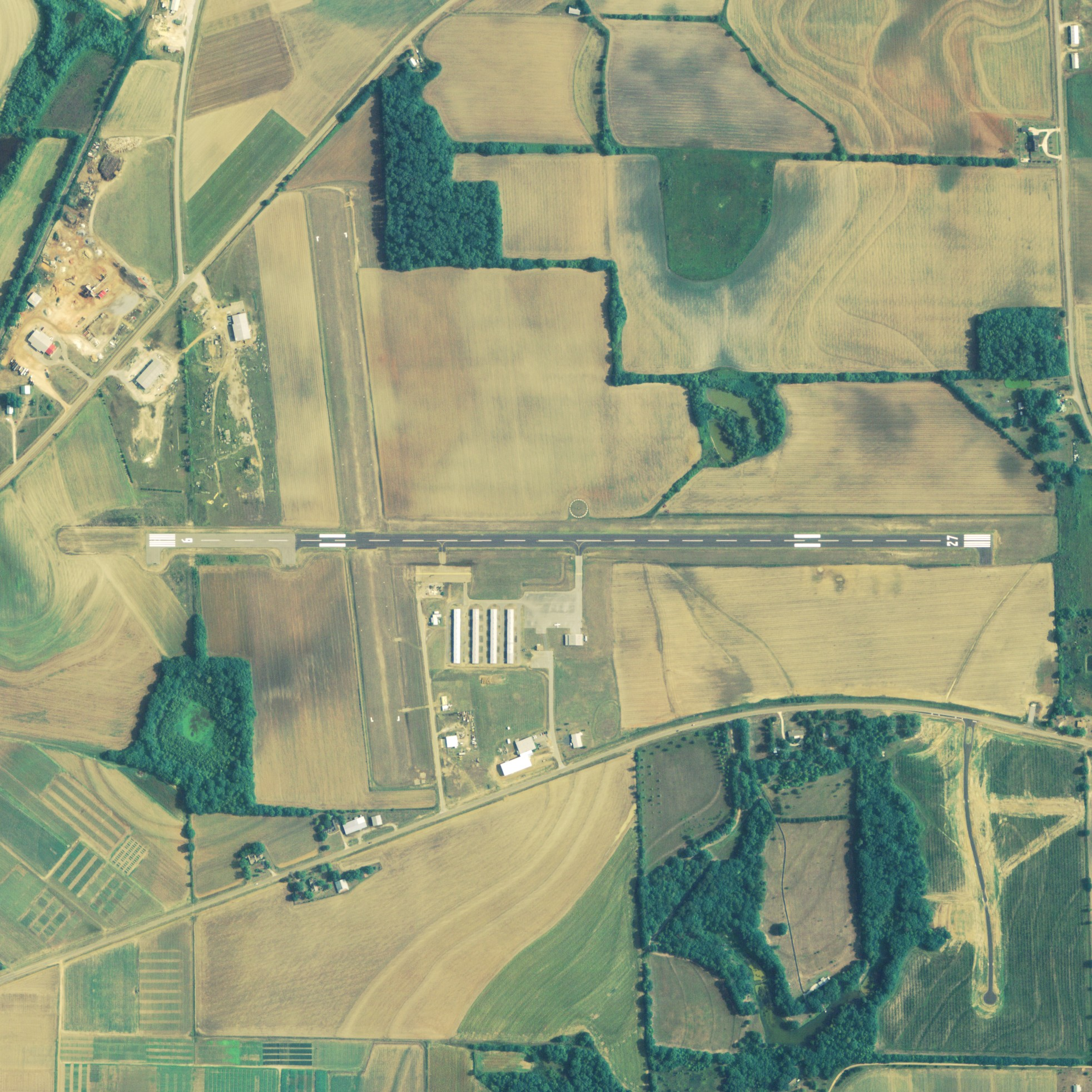
- NAIP aerial image, 2006
- IATA: none; ICAO: KHDL; FAA LID: HDL

Summary
- Airport type: Public
- Owner: City of Headland
- Serves: Headland, Alabama
- Elevation AMSL: 359 ft (109 m)
- Coordinates: 31°21′51″N 085°18′45″W
- Website: www.flyheadland.org

Map
- Location of airport in Alabama 0J6 (the United States)

Runways
Direction	Length		Surface
Direction	ft	m	Surface
9/27	5,002	1,525	Asphalt
17/35	2,865	873	Turf

Statistics (2010)
- Aircraft operations: 41,203
- Based aircraft: 30
- Source: Federal Aviation Administration

Headland Municipal Airport (ICAO: KHDL, FAA LID: HDL, formerly 0J6) is a Federally-owned, city-maintained, public-use airport located two nautical miles (4 km) northeast of the central business district of Headland, a city in Henry County, Alabama, United States.

This airport is included in the FAA's National Plan of Integrated Airport Systems for 2011–2015 and 2009–2013, both of which categorized it as a general aviation facility.

== Facilities and aircraft ==
Headland Municipal Airport covers an area of 328 acres (133 ha) at an elevation of 359 feet (109 m) above mean sea level. It has two runways: 9/27 is 5,002 by 80 feet (1,525 x 24 m) with an asphalt pavement and 17/35 is 2,865 by 162 feet (873 x 49 m) with a turf surface.

For the 12-month period ending November 5, 2010, the airport had 41,203 aircraft operations, an average of 112 per day: 90% general aviation and 10% military. At that time there were 30 aircraft based at this airport: 93% single-engine and 7% multi-engine.

== See also ==
- List of airports in Alabama
