= Grove Hill Municipal Airport =

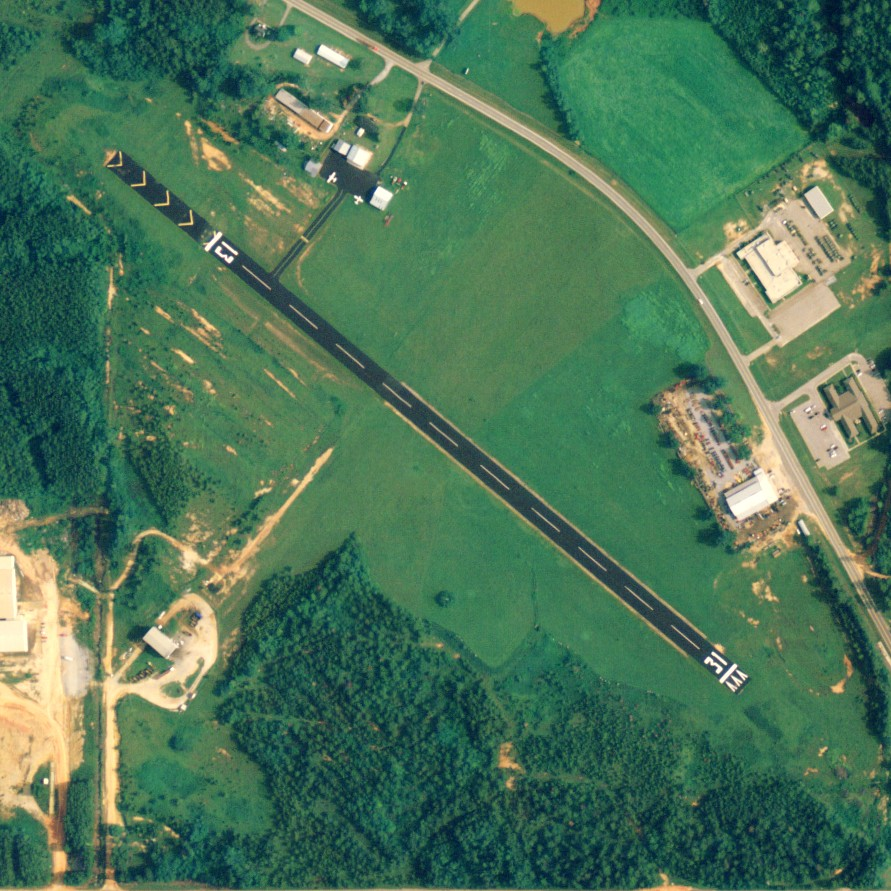
- NAIP aerial image, 2006
- IATA: none; ICAO: none; FAA LID: ~~3A0~~

Summary
- Airport type: Closed
- Owner: City of Grove Hill
- Serves: Grove Hill, Alabama
- Elevation AMSL: 478 ft (146 m)
- Coordinates: 31°41′22″N 087°45′41″W

Map
- Location of airport in Alabama 3A0 (the United States)

Runways
Direction	Length		Surface
Direction	ft	m	Surface
13/31	2,704	824	Asphalt

Statistics (2010)
- Aircraft operations: 2,490
- Based aircraft: 6
- Source: Federal Aviation Administration

Grove Hill Municipal Airport (FAA LID: 3A0) was a city-owned public-use airport located two nautical miles (3.7 km) southeast of the central business district of Grove Hill, a city in Clarke County, Alabama, United States. According to the FAA's National Plan of Integrated Airport Systems for 2009–2013, it was categorized as a general aviation facility. The airport has been permanently closed.

== Facilities and aircraft ==
Grove Hill Municipal Airport covers an area of 130 acres (53 ha) at an elevation of 478 feet (146 m) above mean sea level. It has one runway designated 13/31 with an asphalt surface measuring 2,704 by 75 feet (824 x 23 m).

For the 12-month period ending February 23, 2010, the airport had 2,490 general aviation aircraft operations, an average of 207 per month. At that time there were 6 aircraft based at this airport: 83% single-engine and 17% multi-engine.

== See also ==
- List of airports in Alabama
