= Geneva Municipal Airport =

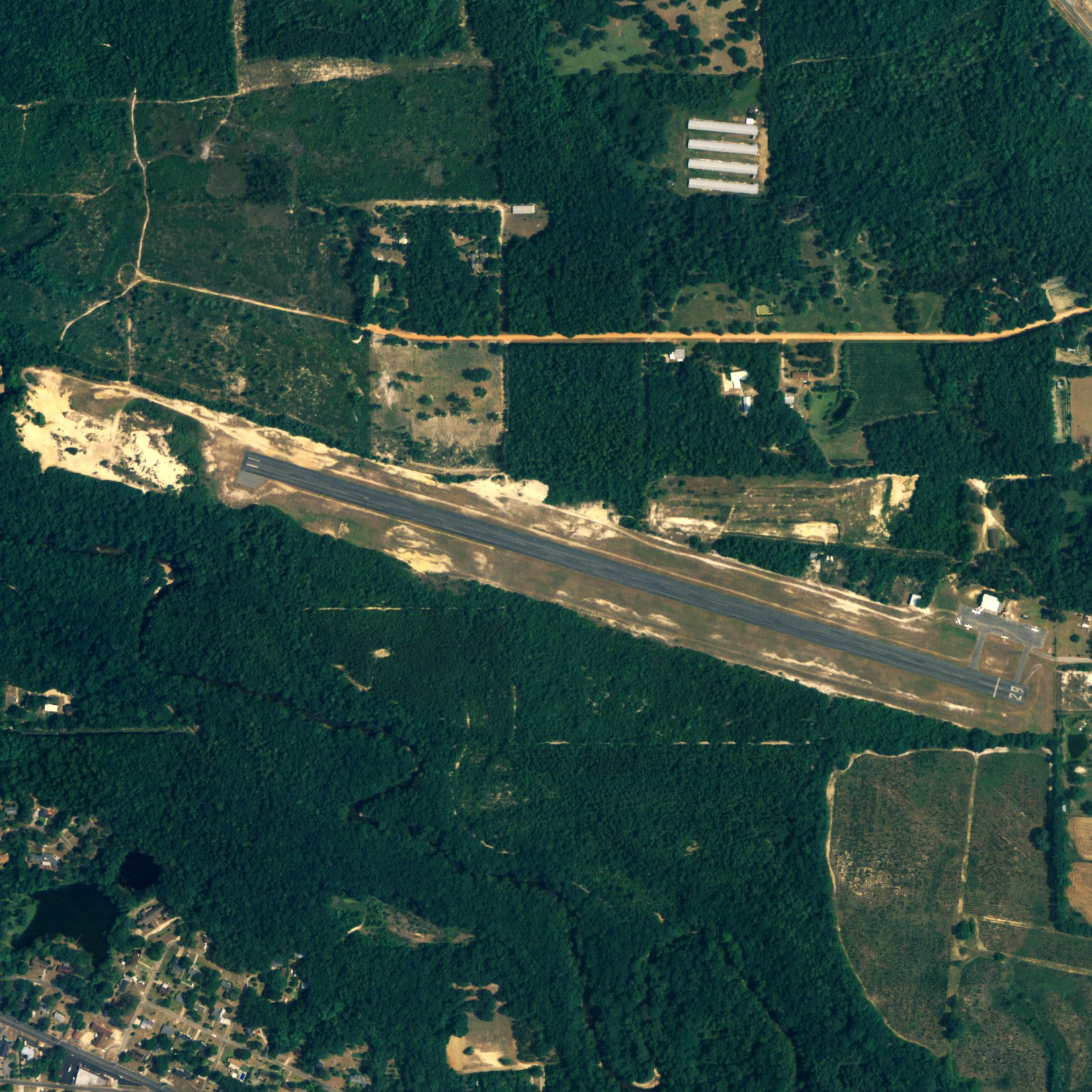
- NAIP aerial image, 2006
- IATA: none; ICAO: none; FAA LID: 33J

Summary
- Airport type: Public
- Owner: City of Geneva
- Operator: Kachemak Bay Flying Service
- Serves: Geneva, Alabama
- Elevation AMSL: 101 ft (31 m)
- Coordinates: 31°03′09″N 085°52′08″W
- Interactive map of Geneva Municipal Airport

Runways
Direction	Length		Surface
Direction	ft	m	Surface
11/29	3,984	1,214	Asphalt

Statistics (2023)
- Aircraft operations: 9,069
- Based aircraft: 20
- Source: Federal Aviation Administration

Geneva Municipal Airport (FAA LID: 33J) is a city-owned public-use airport located two nautical miles (3.7 km) north of the central business district of Geneva, a city in Geneva County, Alabama, United States. According to the FAA's National Plan of Integrated Airport Systems for 2009–2013, it is categorized as a general aviation facility.

== Facilities and aircraft ==
Geneva Municipal Airport covers an area of 105 acres (42 ha) at an elevation of 101 feet (31 m) above mean sea level. It has one runway designated 11/29 with an asphalt surface measuring 3,998 by 100 feet (1,219 x 30 m).

For the 12-month period ending June 10, 2009, the airport had 9,069 aircraft operations, an average of 24 per day: 93% general aviation and 67% military. At that time there were 22 aircraft based at this airport, all single-engine.

== See also ==
- List of airports in Alabama
