= Scottsboro Municipal Airport =

Airport in Alabama, United States

Scottsboro Municipal Airport Word Field
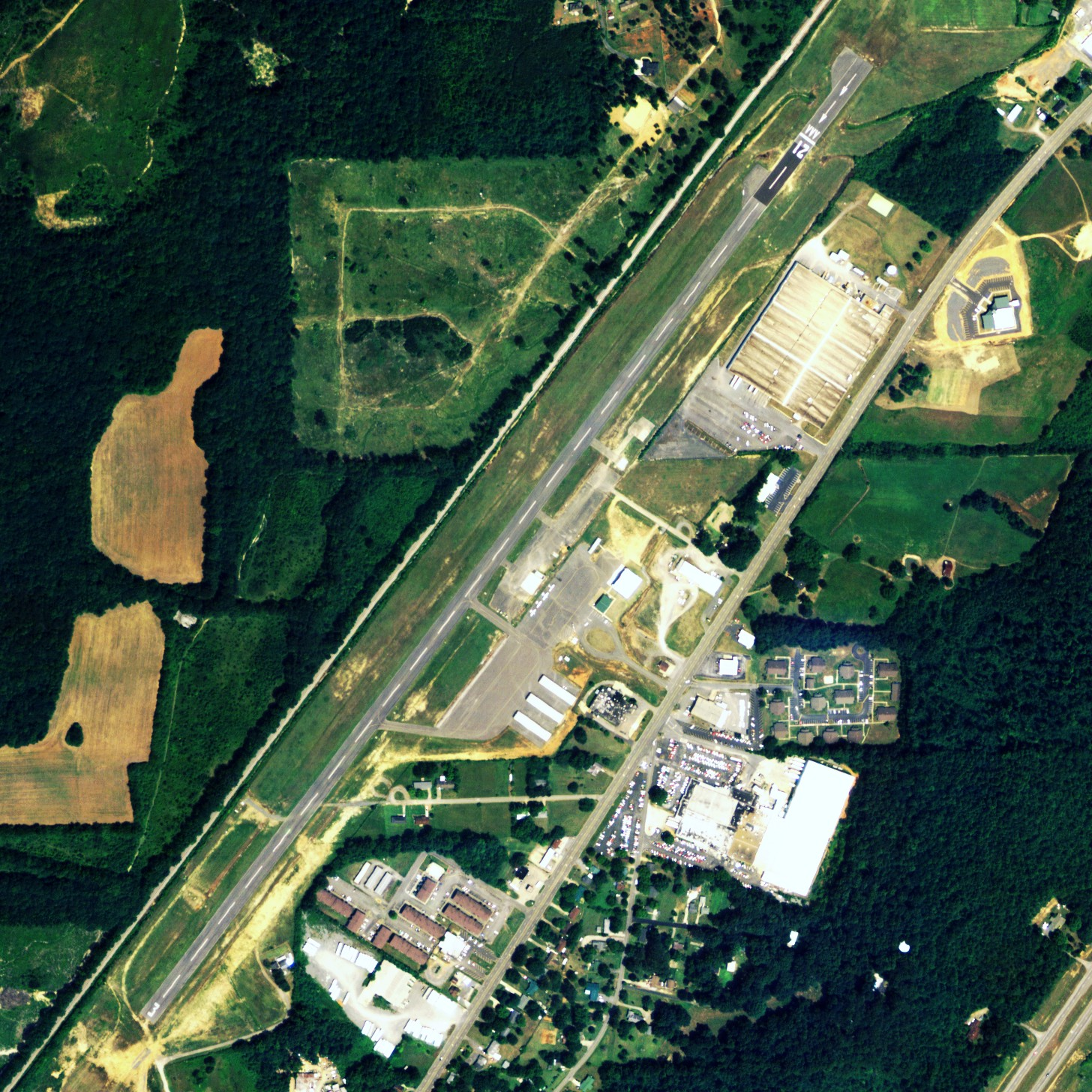
- NAIP aerial image, 2006
- IATA: none; ICAO: none; FAA LID: 4A6

Summary
- Airport type: Public
- Owner: City of Scottsboro
- Serves: Scottsboro, Alabama
- Elevation AMSL: 650 ft (200 m)
- Coordinates: 34°41′19″N 086°00′21″W
- Website: CityOfScottsboro.com/...
- Interactive map of Scottsboro Municipal Airport

Runways
| Direction | Length | | Surface |
| Direction | ft | m | Surface |
|---|---|---|---|
| 4/22 | 5,250 | 1,600 | Asphalt |

Statistics (2009)
- Aircraft operations: 7,745
- Based aircraft: 40
- Source: Federal Aviation Administration

Scottsboro Municipal Airport (FAA LID: 4A6), also known as Word Field, is a city-owned public-use airport located two nautical miles (3.7 km) northeast of the central business district of Scottsboro, a city in Jackson County, Alabama, United States. According to the FAA's National Plan of Integrated Airport Systems for 2009–2013, it is categorized as a general aviation facility.

== Facilities and aircraft ==
Scottsboro Municipal Airport covers an area of 49 acres (20 ha) at an elevation of 650 feet (198 m) above mean sea level. It has one runway designated 4/22 with an asphalt surface measuring 5,250 by 80 feet (1,600 x 24 m).

For the 12-month period ending May 12, 2009, the airport had 7,745 aircraft operations, an average of 21 per day, all general aviation. At that time there were 40 aircraft based at this airport: 82.5% single-engine, 2.5% multi-engine and 15% ultralight.

== See also ==
- List of airports in Alabama
