= LM4 =

LM4, lm4, may refer to:

- Vektor LM4, a South African semi-automatic civilian 5.56×45mm assault rifle
- Semmerling LM4, a five-shot .45 ACP manually repeating double-action pocket pistol
- Little Wing LM-4, an autogyro rotorcraft aeroplane
- GM LM4 engine, a small-block automotive engine from General Motors
- Men's coxless lightweight rowing fours (LM4−) competition class

== See also ==
- 1M4
- LM (disambiguation)
