= Foley Municipal Airport =

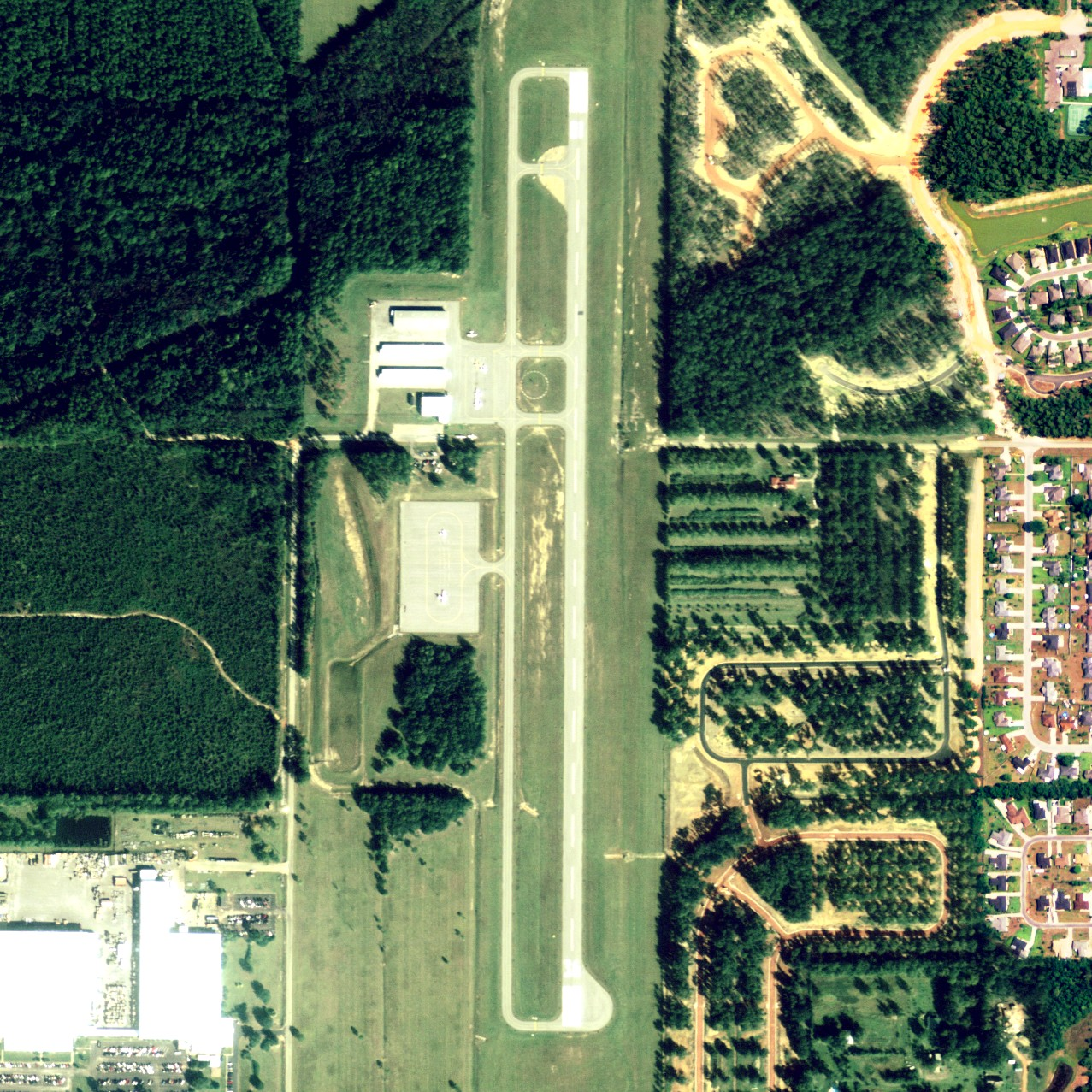
- NAIP aerial image, 30 June 2006
- IATA: none; ICAO: none; FAA LID: 5R4

Summary
- Airport type: Public
- Owner: City of Foley
- Serves: Foley, Alabama
- Elevation AMSL: 74 ft (23 m)
- Coordinates: 30°25′40″N 087°42′04″W

Map
- Location of airport in Alabama 5R4 (the United States)

Runways
Direction	Length		Surface
Direction	ft	m	Surface
18/36	3,700	1,128	Asphalt

Statistics (2010)
- Aircraft operations: 24,700
- Based aircraft: 28
- Source: Federal Aviation Administration

Foley Municipal Airport (FAA LID: 5R4) is a city-owned public-use airport located three nautical miles (4 mi, 6 km) northwest of the central business district of Foley, a city in Baldwin County, Alabama, United States.

This airport is included in the FAA's National Plan of Integrated Airport Systems for 2011–2015 and 2009–2013, both of which categorized it as a general aviation facility.

Foley Municipal Airport was opened to the public in February 1967 replacing the earlier airport to the east of town near the present location of Barin NOLF.

== Fixed-base operator ==
The fixed-base operator at Foley Airport is Lightning Aviation, founded in 2010 by retired Army helicopter pilot Roger Watkins. The company has trained thousands of Navy and Marine pilots and Naval Flight Officers (NFOs) for the Navy's introductory flight screening.

Lightning Aviation now offers pilot training to civilians seeking their private, instrument, commercial, and multi-engine certificates and ratings.

Lightning Aviation operates and maintains a fleet of Cessna and Piper aircraft. They also offer limited maintenance services.

== Facilities and aircraft ==
Foley Municipal Airport covers an area of 104 acres (42 ha) at an elevation of 74 feet (23 m) above mean sea level. It has one runway designated 18/36 with an asphalt surface measuring 3,700 by 75 feet (1,128 x 23 m).

There are currently 40 T-hangars at the field owned and operated by the City of Foley. There is also a large hangar used by the FBO for maintenance. There is a pilot lounge with restrooms and an office area.

For the 12-month period ending November 1, 2017, the airport had 24,700 general aviation aircraft operations, an average of 67 per day. At that time there were 28 aircraft based at this airport: 86% single-engine and 14% multi-engine.

== See also ==
- List of airports in Alabama
