= List of airports in Alabama =

This is a list of airports in Alabama (a U.S. state), grouped by type and sorted by location. It contains all public-use and military airports in the state. Some private-use and former airports may be included where notable, such as airports that were previously public-use, those with commercial enplanements recorded by the FAA or airports assigned an IATA airport code.

== Airports ==
This list contains the following information:

- **City served** – The city generally associated with the airport, as per the airport's master record with the Federal Aviation Administration. This is not always the actual location since some airports are located in smaller towns outside of the city they serve. It is not meant to be a complete list of cities served, which can be found in or added to each airport's Wikipedia article.
- **FAA** – The location identifier assigned by the Federal Aviation Administration (FAA).
- **IATA** – The airport code assigned by the International Air Transport Association (IATA). Those that do not match the FAA code are shown in bold.
- **ICAO** – The location indicator assigned by the International Civil Aviation Organization (ICAO).
- **Airport name** – The official airport name. Those shown in **bold** indicate the airport has scheduled passenger service on commercial airlines.
- **Role** – One of four FAA airport categories, as per the 2023-2027 National Plan of Integrated Airport Systems (NPIAS) report:
  - P-s: Commercial service – primary are publicly owned airports that receive scheduled passenger service and have more than 10,000 passenger boardings (enplanements) each year. Each primary airport is sub-classified by the FAA as one of the following four "hub" types (s):
    - L: Large hub that accounts for at least 1% of total U.S. passenger enplanements.
    - M: Medium hub that accounts for between 0.25% and 1% of total U.S. passenger enplanements.
    - S: Small hub that accounts for between 0.05% and 0.25% of total U.S. passenger enplanements.
    - N: Nonhub that accounts for less than 0.05% of total U.S. passenger enplanements, but more than 10,000 annual enplanements.
  - CS: Commercial service – nonprimary are publicly owned airports that receive scheduled passenger service and have at least 2,500 passenger boardings each year.
  - R: Reliever airports are designated by the FAA to relieve congestion at a large commercial service airport and to provide more general aviation access to the overall community.
  - GA: General aviation airports are the largest single group of airports in the U.S. airport system. They are public-use airports that do not have scheduled service or have scheduled service with less than 2,500 passenger boardings each year.
- **Enplanements** – The number of enplanements (commercial passenger boardings) that occurred at the airport in calendar year 2024, as per FAA records.

City served	FAA	IATA	ICAO	Airport name	Role	Enplanements (2024)
				**Commercial service – primary airports**		
Birmingham	BHM	BHM	KBHM	**Birmingham–Shuttlesworth International Airport**	P-S	1,596,510
Dothan	DHN	DHN	KDHN	**Dothan Regional Airport**	P-N	39,339
Huntsville	HSV	HSV	KHSV	**Huntsville International Airport** (Carl T. Jones Field)	P-S	804,665
Mobile	MOB	MOB	KMOB	**Mobile Regional Airport**	P-N	314,406
Montgomery	MGM	MGM	KMGM	**Montgomery Regional Airport** (Dannelly Field)	P-N	193,746
				**Commercial service – nonprimary airports**		
Muscle Shoals	MSL	MSL	KMSL	**Northwest Alabama Regional Airport**	CS	7,373
				**Reliever airports**		
Bessemer	EKY		KEKY	Bessemer Airport	R	15
Pell City	PLR	PLR	KPLR	St. Clair County Airport	R	0
				**General aviation airports**		
Abbeville	0J0			Abbeville Municipal Airport	GA	0
Alabaster	EET		KEET	Shelby County Airport	GA	0
Albertville	BFZ	BFZ	KBFZ	Albertville Regional Airport (Thomas J. Brumlik Field)	GA	0
Alexander City	ALX	ALX	KALX	Thomas C. Russell Field	GA	6
Aliceville	AIV	AIV	KAIV	George Downer Airport	GA	6
Andalusia / Opp	79J			South Alabama Regional Airport (Bill Benton Field)	GA	0
Anniston	ANB	ANB	KANB	Anniston Regional Airport (was Anniston Metropolitan)	GA	43
Ashland / Lineville	26A			Ashland/Lineville Airport	GA	0
Atmore	0R1			Atmore Municipal Airport	GA	0
Auburn	AUO	AUO	KAUO	Auburn University Regional Airport (was Auburn-Opelika Robert G. Pitts)	GA	97
Bay Minette	1R8			Bay Minette Municipal Airport	GA	0
Brewton	12J			Brewton Municipal Airport	GA	0
Butler	09A			Butler-Choctaw County Airport	GA	41
Camden	61A			Camden Municipal Airport	GA	0
Centre	PYP		KPYP	Centre-Piedmont-Cherokee County Regional Airport	GA	0
Centreville	0A8			Bibb County Airport	GA	4
Clanton	02A			Chilton County Airport (was Gragg-Wade Field)	GA	0
Clayton	11A			Clayton Municipal Airport	GA	0
Courtland	9A4			Courtland Airport (was Lawrence County Airport)	GA	0
Cullman	CMD		KCMD	Cullman Regional Airport (Folsom Field)	GA	0
Dauphin Island	4R9			Jeremiah Denton Airport (was Dauphin Island Airport)	GA	0
Decatur	DCU	DCU	KDCU	Pryor Field Regional Airport	GA	0
Demopolis	DYA		KDYA	Demopolis Regional Airport (was Demopolis Municipal)	GA	0
Elba	14J			Carl Folsom Airport	GA	0
Enterprise	EDN	ETS	KEDN	Enterprise Municipal Airport	GA	0
Eufaula	EUF	EUF	KEUF	Weedon Field	GA	1
Evergreen	GZH		KGZH	Middleton Field	GA	0
Fairhope	CQF		KCQF	H. L. Sonny Callahan Airport	GA	116
Fayette	M95			Richard Arthur Field	GA	0
Florala	0J4			Florala Municipal Airport	GA	0
Foley	5R4			Foley Municipal Airport	GA	0
Fort Payne	4A9			Isbell Field	GA	0
Gadsden	GAD	GAD	KGAD	Northeast Alabama Regional Airport (was Gadsden Municipal)	GA	5
Geneva	33J			Geneva Municipal Airport	GA	0
Greensboro	7A0			Greensboro Municipal Airport	GA	0
Greenville	PRN		KPRN	Mac Crenshaw Memorial Airport	GA	0
Gulf Shores	JKA	GUF	KJKA	**Jack Edwards Airport**	GA	30
Guntersville	8A1			Guntersville Municipal Airport (Joe Starnes Field)	GA	0
Haleyville	1M4			Posey Field	GA	0
Hamilton	HAB	HAB	KHAB	Marion County – Rankin Fite Airport	GA	0
Hartselle	5M0			Hartselle–Morgan County Regional Airport (was Rountree Field)	GA	0
Headland	0J6			Headland Municipal Airport	GA	0
Huntsville	MDQ		KMDQ	Madison County Executive Airport (Tom Sharp Jr. Field)	GA	48
Jackson	4R3			Jackson Municipal Airport	GA	0
Jasper	JFX		KJFX	Walker County Airport (Bevill Field)	GA	0
Lanett	7A3			Lanett Municipal Airport	GA	0
Marion	A08			Vaiden Field	GA	0
Mobile	BFM	BFM	KBFM	Mobile International Airport (was Brookley Aeroplex)	GA	7,633
Monroeville	MVC	MVC	KMVC	Monroe County Airport	GA	1
Oneonta	20A			Robbins Field	GA	0
Ozark	71J			Blackwell Field	GA	0
Prattville	1A9			Prattville-Grouby Field (Prattville Airport)	GA	0
Reform	3M8			North Pickens Airport	GA	0
Roanoke	7A5			Roanoke Municipal Airport	GA	0
Russellville	M22			Bill Pugh Field (was Russellville Municipal Airport)	GA	0
Scottsboro	4A6			Scottsboro Municipal Airport (Word Field)	GA	0
Selma	SEM	SEM	KSEM	Craig Field	GA	0
St. Elmo	2R5			St. Elmo Airport	GA	0
Sylacauga	SCD		KSCD	Sylacauga Municipal Airport (Merkel Field)	GA	4
Talladega	ASN	ASN	KASN	Talladega Municipal Airport	GA	0
Troy	TOI	TOI	KTOI	Troy Municipal Airport (N. Kenneth Campbell Field)	GA	0
Tuscaloosa	TCL	TCL	KTCL	Tuscaloosa National Airport	GA	3,513
Tuskegee	06A			Moton Field Municipal Airport	GA	0
Union Springs	07A			Franklin Field	GA	0
Wetumpka	08A			Wetumpka Municipal Airport	GA	0
				**Other public-use airports** (not listed in NPIAS)		
Addison	2A8			Addison Municipal Airport		
Ardmore	1M3			Ardmore Airport		
Bayou La Batre	5R7			Roy E. Ray Airport		
Chatom	5R1			Roy Wilcox Airport		
Creola	15A			Mark Reynolds/North Mobile County Airport		
Double Springs	3M2			Double Springs–Winston County Airport		
Eutaw	3A7			Eutaw Municipal Airport (closed indefinitely)		
Fairhope	5AL			Fish River Seaplane Base		
Fort Deposit	67A			Fort Deposit–Lowndes County Airport		
Grove Hill	3A0			Grove Hill Municipal Airport		
Hazel Green	M38			Hazel Green Airport		
Huntsville	3M5			Moontown Airport		
Luverne	04A			Frank Sikes Airport		
Pine Hill	71A			Pine Hill Municipal Airport		
Samson	1A4			Logan Field (Samson Municipal Airport)		
Stevenson	7A6			Stevenson Airport		
Stockton	HL2			Hubbard Landing Seaplane Base		
Tallassee	41A			Reeves Airport		
Vernon	M55			Lamar County Airport		
Weaver	25A			McMinn Airport		
				**Other government/military airports**		
Foley	NBJ	NHX	KNBJ	NOLF Barin		
Foley			~~KNHL~~	NOLF Wolf (closed)		
Huntsville	HUA	HUA	KHUA	Redstone Army Airfield (Redstone Arsenal)		
Montgomery	MXF	MXF	KMXF	Maxwell Air Force Base		177
Ozark	OZR	OZR	KOZR	Cairns Army Airfield (Fort Novosel)		
Ozark	HEY	HEY	KHEY	Hanchey Army Heliport (Fort Novosel)		
Ozark	LOR	LOR	KLOR	Lowe Army Heliport (Fort Novosel)		
Robertsdale			~~KNQB~~	NOLF Silverhill (closed)		
Summerdale	NFD		KNFD	NOLF Summerdale		
				**Notable private-use airports**		
Gardendale	AL18			Parker Field		
Hurtsboro	AL05			Sehoy Airport		
Tuskegee	27AL			Little Texas Airport		
Tuskegee	AL73	TGE		Sharpe Field (Tuskegee Army Airfield)		
				**Notable former airports**		
Brundidge	~~60A~~			Brundidge Municipal Airport (closed)		
Centre	~~C22~~			Centre Municipal Airport (closed)		
Goodwater	~~69A~~			Coosa County Airport (closed 1997-2002)		
Linden	~~70A~~			Freddie Jones Field (closed)		
Mobile	~~S26~~			Skywest Airpark (closed)		
Moundville	~~L44~~			Moundville Airport (closed)		
Selma	~~S63~~			Skyharbor Airport (closed)		
York	~~23A~~			Mallard Airport (closed 2001?)		

== See also ==
- Essential Air Service
- Alabama World War II Army Airfields
- Wikipedia:WikiProject Aviation/Airline destination lists: North America#Alabama
