= IM3 =

IM3 may refer to:

- Bristol Pegasus I.M3, a British aero engine
- Innocenti IM3, a BMC car model
- Onchan, Isle of Man (Royal Mail postcode IM3)
- Ia3̅, three-dimensional space group number 206
- Indosat Multimedia Mobile (IM3), a telecommunications subsidiary
- Infamous Mobb (aka "IM3"), an American hip hop group
- Intermediate 3 (IM3), a competition class under British Rowing
- Intuitive Machines IM-3, a U.S. commercial lunar lander space mission

== See also ==
- Iron Man 3, a 2013 superhero film
- IM (disambiguation)
- LM3
- 1M3
