= Ashland/Lineville Airport =

Airport in Alabama, United States

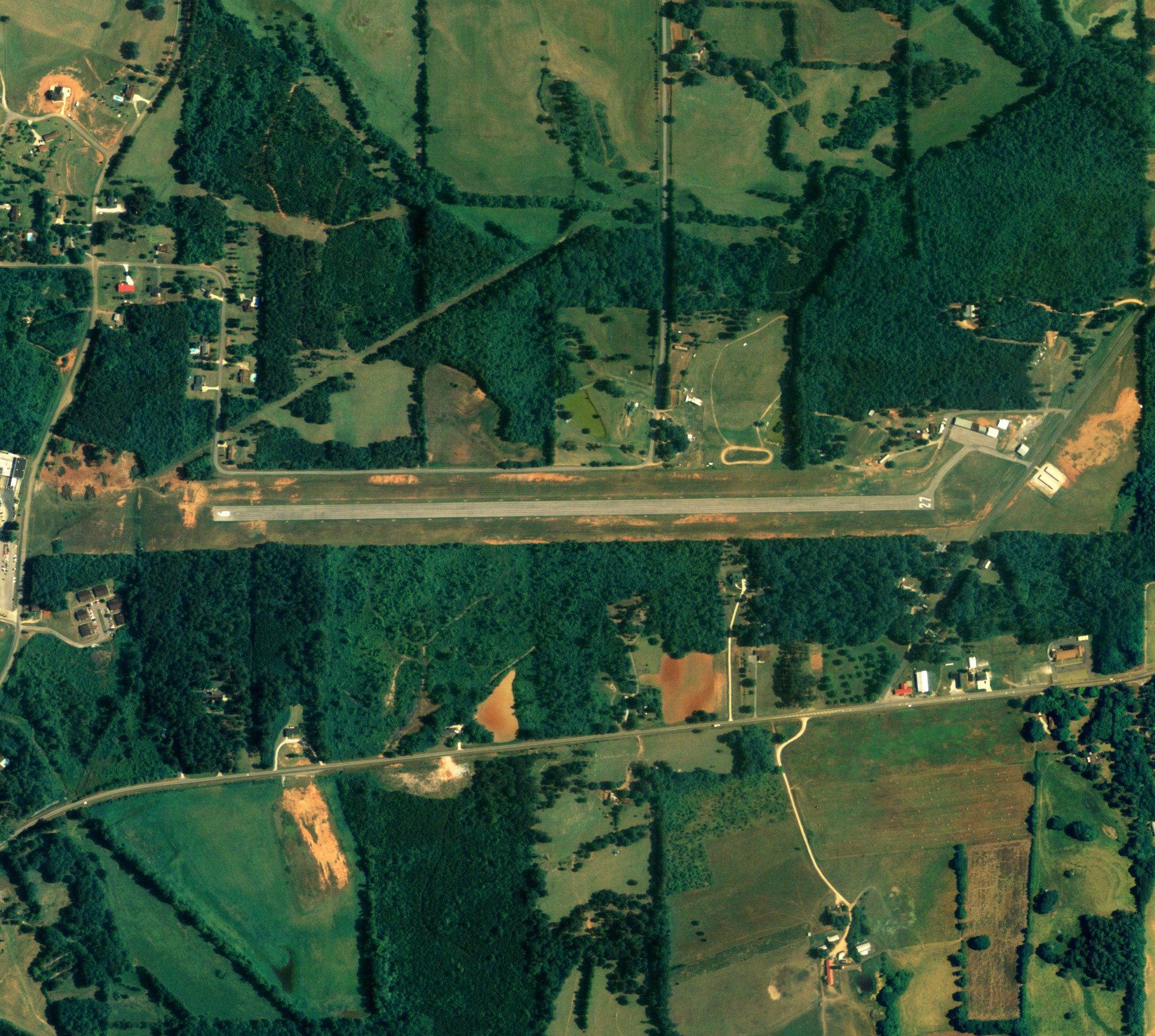
- NAIP aerial image, 15 June 2006
- IATA: none; ICAO: none; FAA LID: 26A

Summary
- Airport type: Public
- Owner: Clay County, Alabama
- Serves: Ashland-Lineville, Alabama
- Elevation AMSL: 1,065 ft (325 m)
- Coordinates: 33°17′03″N 085°48′33″W

Map
- Location of airport in Alabama 26A (the United States)

Runways
Direction	Length		Surface
Direction	ft	m	Surface
9/27	4,023	1,226	Asphalt

Statistics (2017)
- Aircraft operations (2016): 2,863
- Based aircraft: 7
- Source: Federal Aviation Administration

Ashland/Lineville Airport (FAA LID: 26A) is a county-owned public-use airport located 2 nautical miles (4 km) northeast of the central business district of Ashland, a town in Clay County, Alabama, United States. According to the FAA's National Plan of Integrated Airport Systems for 2009–2013, it is categorized as a general aviation facility.

== Facilities and aircraft ==
Ashland/Lineville Airport covers an area of 35 acres (0.05 sq mi; 0.14 km^{2}) which contains one runway designated 9/27 is 3,997 x 80 feet (1,218 x 24 meters) asphalt pavement. For the 12-month period ending February 12, 2007, the airport had 2,863 general aviation aircraft operations.

== See also ==
- List of airports in Alabama
