= Lamar County Airport =

- IATA: none; ICAO: none; FAA LID: M55

Summary
- Airport type: Public
- Owner: Lamar County Commission
- Serves: Lamar County, Alabama
- Location: Vernon, Alabama
- Elevation AMSL: 463 ft / 141 m
- Coordinates: 33°50′48″N 088°06′56″W
- Website: http://www.lamarcounty.us/lamar-county-airport
- Interactive map of Lamar County Airport

Runways
| Direction | Length | | Surface |
| Direction | ft | m | Surface |
|---|---|---|---|
| 17/35 | 3,613 | 1,101 | Asphalt |

Statistics (2019)
- Aircraft operations (year ending 2/1/2019): 1,604
- Based aircraft: 0
- Source: Federal Aviation Administration

Lamar County Airport (FAA LID: M55) is a public-use airport in Lamar County, Alabama, United States. It is owned by the Lamar County Commission and located six nautical miles (7 mi, 11 km) north of the central business district of Vernon, Alabama.

== Facilities and aircraft ==
Lamar County Airport covers an area of 75 acres (30 ha) at an elevation of 463 feet (141 m) above mean sea level. It has one runway designated 17/35 with an asphalt surface measuring 3,613 by 75 feet (1,101 x 23 m).

For the 12-month period ending February 1, 2019 the airport had 1,604 general aviation aircraft operations, an average of 31 per week.

== See also ==
- List of airports in Alabama
