= Robbins Field =

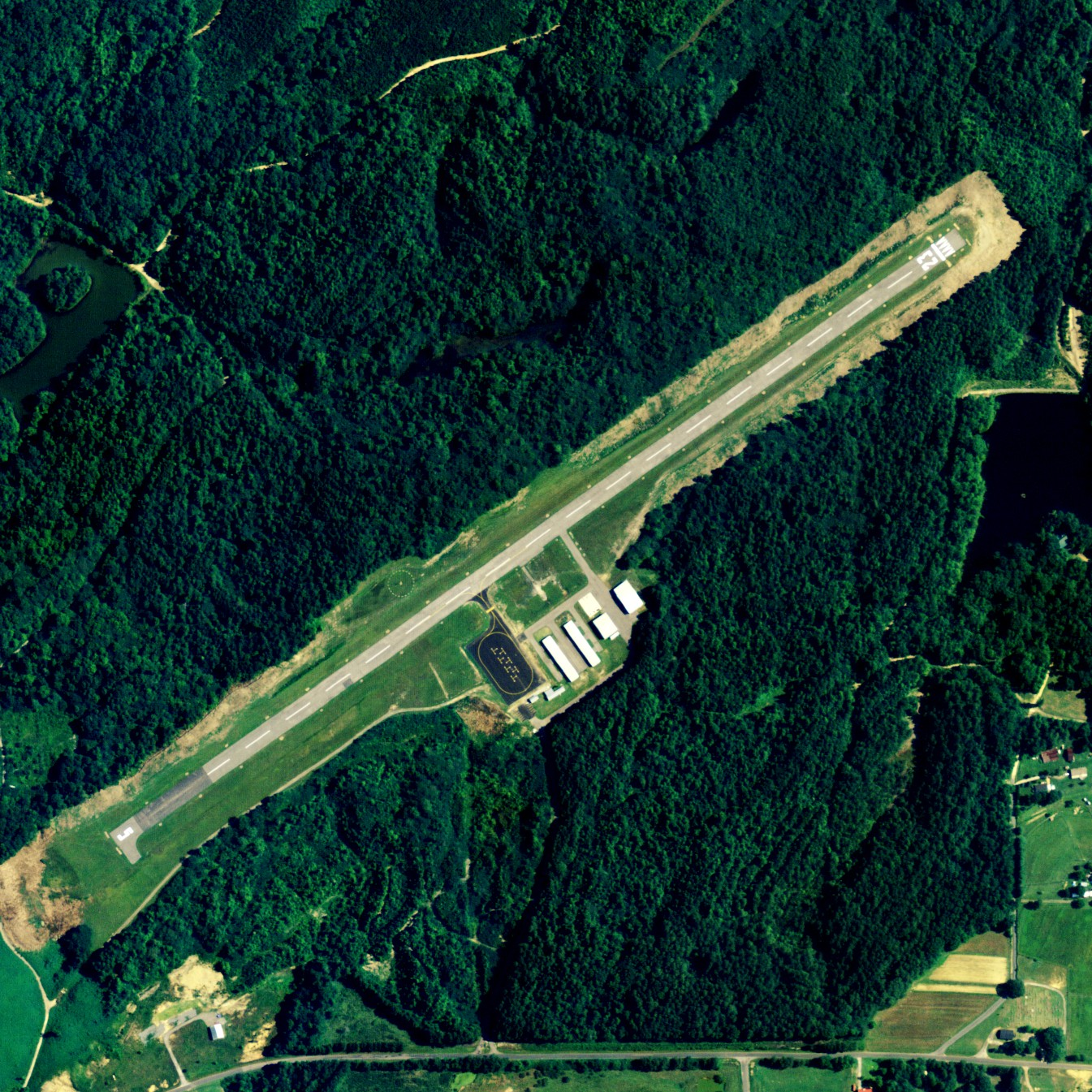
- NAIP aerial image, 2006
- IATA: none; ICAO: none; FAA LID: 20A

Summary
- Airport type: Public
- Owner: City of Oneonta & Blount County
- Serves: Oneonta, Alabama
- Elevation AMSL: 1,140 ft / 347 m
- Coordinates: 33°58′16″N 086°22′49″W
- Interactive map of Robbins Field

Runways
| Direction | Length | | Surface |
| Direction | ft | m | Surface |
|---|---|---|---|
| 5/23 | 4,210 | 1,283 | Asphalt |

Statistics (2010)
- Aircraft operations: 2,776
- Based aircraft: 17
- Source: Federal Aviation Administration

Robbins Field (FAA LID: 20A) is a public use airport located five nautical miles (9 km) northeast of the central business district of Oneonta, a city in Blount County, Alabama, United States. It is owned by the City of Oneonta and Blount County. According to the FAA's National Plan of Integrated Airport Systems for 2009–2013, it is categorized as a general aviation facility.

== Facilities and aircraft ==
Robbins Field covers an area of 43 acres (17 ha) at an elevation of 1,140 feet (347 m) above mean sea level. It has one runway designated 6 / 24 with an asphalt surface measuring 4,210 by 80 feet (1,283 x 24 m).

For the 12-month period ending March 23, 2010, the airport had 2,776 aircraft operations, an average of 231 per month, all general aviation. At that time, there were 17 aircraft based at this airport: 88% single-engine and 12% multi-engine.

== See also ==
- List of airports in Alabama
