= Logan Field (Alabama) =

Logan Field Samson Municipal Airport
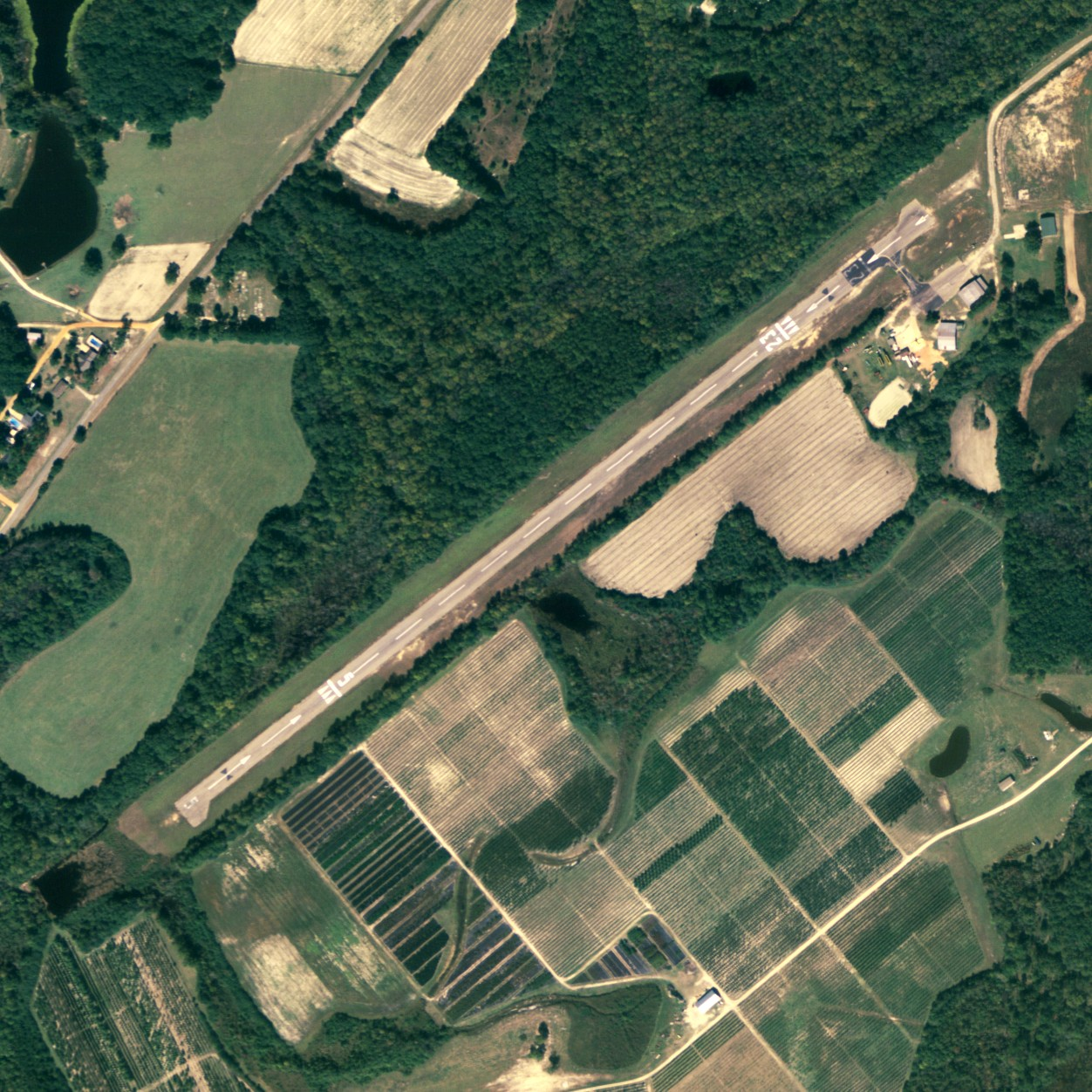
- IATA: none; ICAO: none; FAA LID: 1A4

Summary
- Airport type: Public
- Owner: City of Samson
- Serves: Samson, Alabama
- Elevation AMSL: 200 ft / 61 m
- Coordinates: 31°06′10″N 086°03′44″W
- Interactive map of Logan Field

Runways
Direction	Length		Surface
Direction	ft	m	Surface
5/23	3,256	992	Asphalt
- Source: Federal Aviation Administration

Logan Field (FAA LID: 1A4), also known as Samson Municipal Airport, is a city-owned, public-use airport one nautical mile (2 km) southwest of the central business district of Samson, a city in Geneva County, Alabama, United States.

== Facilities ==
Logan Field has one asphalt paved runway designated 5/23 which measures 3,256 by 75 feet (992 by 23 m).

== See also ==
- List of airports in Alabama
