= Addison Municipal Airport =

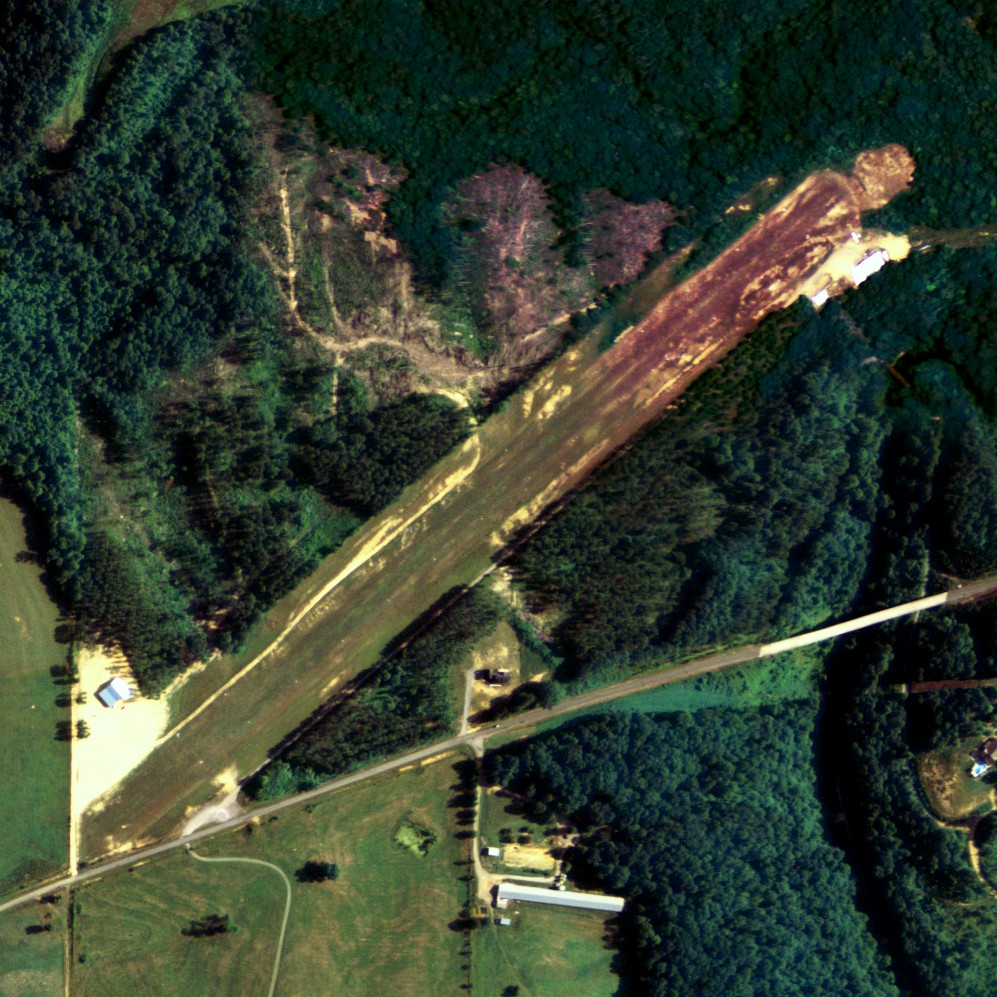
- IATA: none; ICAO: none; FAA LID: 2A8

Summary
- Airport type: Public
- Owner: City of Addison
- Serves: Addison, Alabama
- Elevation AMSL: 786 ft (240 m)
- Coordinates: 34°13′01″N 087°09′28″W
- Interactive map of Addison Municipal Airport

Runways
Direction	Length		Surface
Direction	ft	m	Surface
4/22	2,631	802	Turf

Statistics (2000)
- Aircraft operations: 1,416
- Source: Federal Aviation Administration

Addison Municipal Airport (FAA LID: 2A8) is a city-owned, public-use airport located one mile (2 km) northeast of the central business district of Addison, a city in Winston County, Alabama, United States. It is located at coordinates 34°13′01″N 087°09′28″W.

== Facilities and aircraft ==
Addison Municipal Airport covers an area of 37 acres (15 ha) and has one runway designated 4/22 with a 2,631 by 112 ft (802 by 34 m) turf surface. For the 12-month period ending April 5, 2000, the airport had 1,416 general aviation aircraft operations, an average of 118 per month.

== See also ==
- List of airports in Alabama
