= Hartselle–Morgan County Regional Airport =

Airport in Alabama, United States

Hartselle–Morgan County Regional Airport Rountree Field
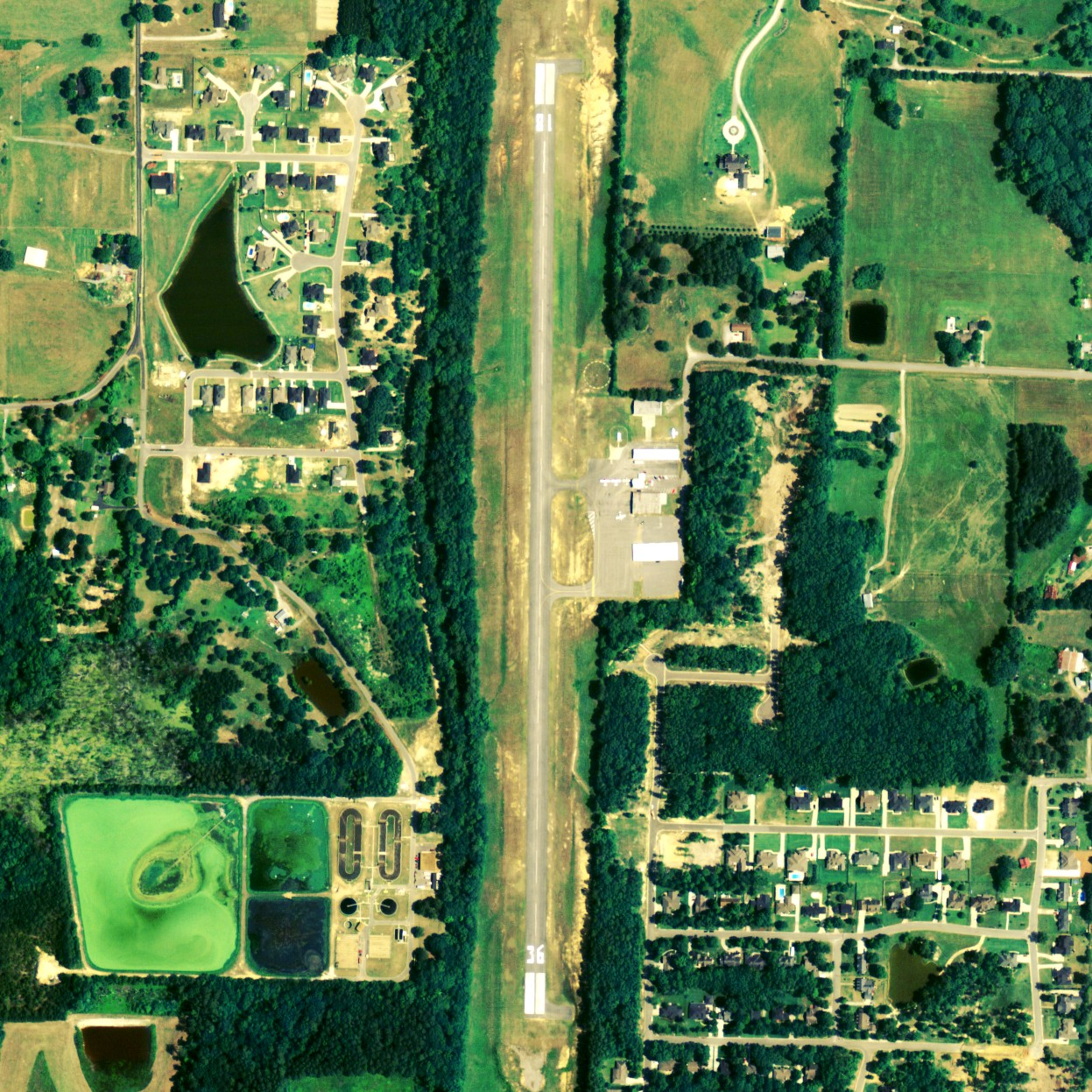
- NAIP aerial image, 24 August 2006
- IATA: none; ICAO: none; FAA LID: 5M0

Summary
- Airport type: Public
- Owner: City of Hartselle
- Serves: Hartselle, Alabama
- Elevation AMSL: 628 ft (191 m)
- Coordinates: 34°24′30″N 086°55′59″W
- Interactive map of Hartselle–Morgan County Regional Airport

Runways
Direction	Length		Surface
Direction	ft	m	Surface
18/36	3,599	1,097	Asphalt

Statistics (2009)
- Aircraft operations: 15,295
- Based aircraft: 20
- Source: Federal Aviation Administration

Hartselle–Morgan County Regional Airport (FAA LID: 5M0) is a public-use airport located two nautical miles (4 km) south of the central business district of Hartselle, a city in Morgan County, Alabama, United States. The airport was formerly known as Rountree Field, named in the 1960s for Asa Rountree Sr., a former head of the Alabama Department of Aeronautics.

This airport is included in the FAA's National Plan of Integrated Airport Systems for 2011–2015 and 2009–2013, both of which categorized it as a general aviation facility.

== Facilities and aircraft ==
Hartselle–Morgan County Regional Airport covers an area of 62 acres (25 ha) at an elevation of 628 feet (191 m) above mean sea level. It has one runway designated 18/36 with an asphalt surface measuring 3,599 by 75 feet (1,097 x 23 m).

For the 12-month period ending July 2, 2009, the airport had 15,295 general aviation aircraft operations, an average of 41 per day. At that time there were 20 aircraft based at this airport: 75% single-engine, 15% multi-engine, 5% jet and 5% helicopter.

== See also ==
- List of airports in Alabama
