= Roanoke Municipal Airport =

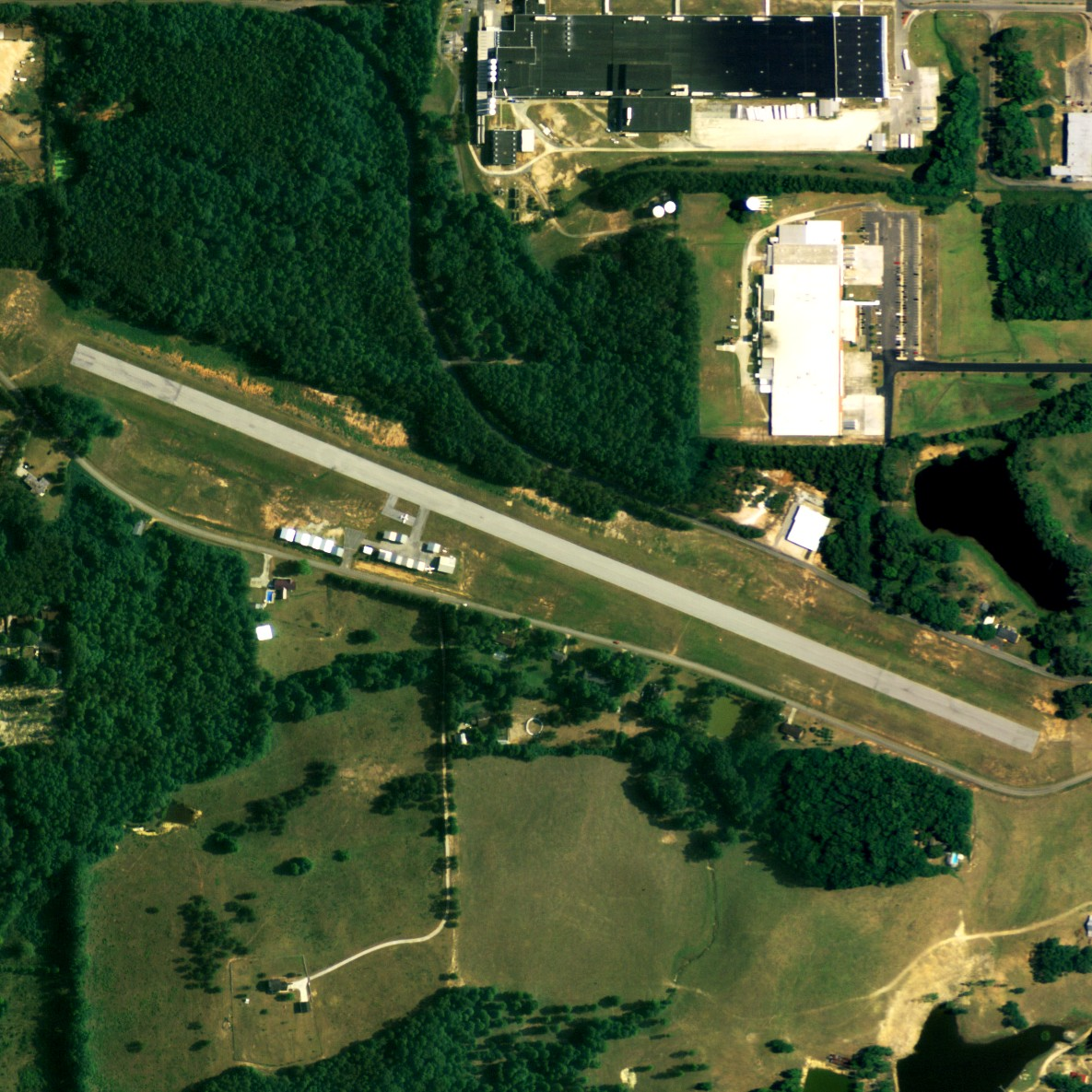
- NAIP image, 2006
- IATA: none; ICAO: none; FAA LID: 7A5

Summary
- Airport type: Public
- Owner: City of Roanoke
- Serves: Roanoke, Alabama
- Elevation AMSL: 907 ft / 276 m
- Coordinates: 33°07′47″N 085°22′20″W
- Interactive map of Roanoke Municipal Airport

Runways
Direction	Length		Surface
Direction	ft	m	Surface
11/29	3,697	1,127	Asphalt

Statistics (2009)
- Aircraft operations: 3,116
- Based aircraft: 16
- Source: Federal Aviation Administration

Roanoke Municipal Airport (FAA LID: 7A5) is two miles south of Roanoke, in Randolph County, Alabama. The FAA's National Plan of Integrated Airport Systems for 2009–2013 categorized it as a general aviation facility.

== Facilities ==
The airport covers 59 acres (24 ha) at an elevation of 907 feet (276 m). Its single runway, 11/29, is 3,697 by 80 feet (1,127 x 24 m) asphalt.

In the year ending March 17, 2009 the airport had 3,116 aircraft operations, average 259 per month, all general aviation. 16 aircraft were then based at this airport: 94% single-engine and 6% ultralight.

== See also ==
- List of airports in Alabama
