= Moontown Airport =

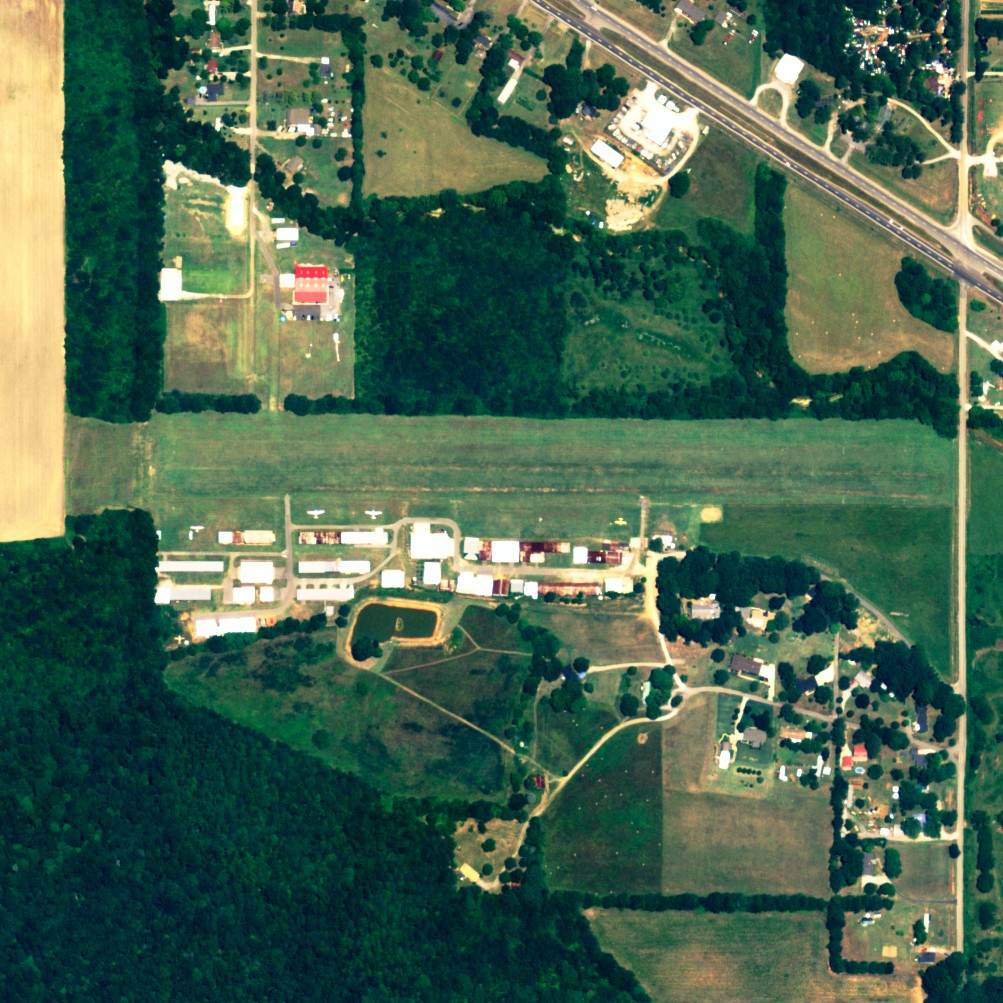
- NAIP aerial image, 15 June 2006
- IATA: none; ICAO: none; FAA LID: 3M5

Summary
- Airport type: Public
- Owner/Operator: 3M5 Airport, Inc
- Location: Brownsboro, Alabama
- Elevation AMSL: 650 ft (200 m)
- Coordinates: 34°44′50″N 086°27′41″W
- Interactive map of Moontown Airport

Runways
Direction	Length		Surface
Direction	ft	m	Surface
9/27	2,180	664	Turf

Statistics (2009)
- Aircraft operations: 15,784
- Based aircraft: 96
- Source: Federal Aviation Administration

Moontown Airport (FAA LID: 3M5) is a privately owned public-use airport located seven nautical miles (13 km) east of the central business district of Huntsville, a city in Madison County, Alabama, United States. It is 16 miles (26 km) east of Huntsville International Airport (HSV).

== Facilities and aircraft ==
Moontown Airport covers an area of 17 acres (6.9 ha) at an elevation of 650 feet (198 m) above mean sea level. It has one runway designated 9/27 with a turf surface measuring 2,180 by 160 feet (664 x 49 m).

For the 12-month period ending April 22, 2009, the airport had 15,784 general aviation aircraft operations, an average of 43 per day. At that time there were 96 aircraft based at this airport: 86% single-engine, 2% multi-engine, 10% glider and 1% ultralight.

Moontown Airport is the home base for the Huntsville Chapter of the EAA (Experimental Aircraft Association) and the Huntsville Soaring Club.

== See also ==
- List of airports in Alabama
