= Richard Arthur Field =

Airport in Alabama, United States

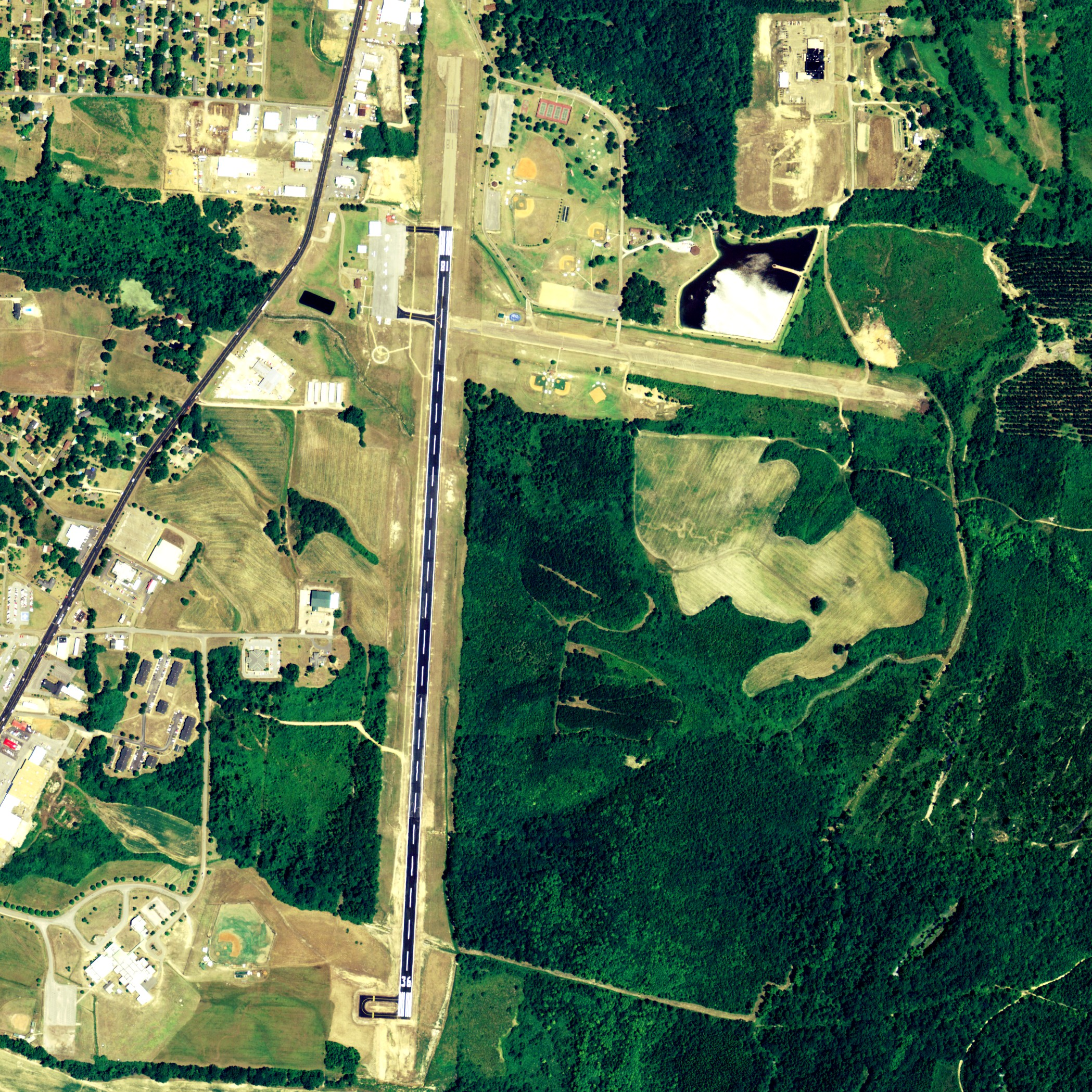
- NAIP aerial image, 21 June 2006
- IATA: none; ICAO: none; FAA LID: M95

Summary
- Airport type: Public
- Owner: City of Fayette
- Serves: Fayette, Alabama
- Elevation AMSL: 357 ft (109 m)
- Coordinates: 33°42′33″N 087°48′55″W
- Interactive map of Richard Arthur Field

Runways
| Direction | Length | | Surface |
| Direction | ft | m | Surface |
|---|---|---|---|
| 18/36 | 5,008 | 1,526 | Asphalt |

Statistics (2010)
- Aircraft operations: 15,300
- Based aircraft: 8
- Source: Federal Aviation Administration

Richard Arthur Field (FAA LID: M95) is a city-owned public-use airport located three nautical miles (4 mi, 6 km) northeast of the central business district of Fayette, a city in Fayette County, Alabama, United States.

This airport is included in the FAA's National Plan of Integrated Airport Systems for 2011–2015 and 2009–2013, both of which categorized it as a general aviation facility.

== Facilities and aircraft ==
Richard Arthur Field covers an area of 150 acres (61 ha) at an elevation of 357 feet (109 m) above mean sea level. It has one runway designated 18/36 with an asphalt surface measuring 5,008 by 80 feet (1,526 x 24 m).

For the 12-month period ending October 1, 2010, the airport had 15,300 general aviation aircraft operations, an average of 41 per day. At that time there were 8 aircraft based at this airport, all single-engine.

== See also ==
- List of airports in Alabama
