= Roy Wilcox Airport =

- IATA: none; ICAO: none; FAA LID: 5R1

Summary
- Airport type: Public
- Owner: Town of Chatom
- Serves: Chatom, Alabama
- Elevation AMSL: 165 ft / 50 m
- Coordinates: 31°27′07″N 088°11′40″W

Map
- Location of airport in Alabama 5R1 (the United States)

Runways
Direction	Length		Surface
Direction	ft	m	Surface
12/30	4,002	1,220	Asphalt

Statistics (2017)
- Aircraft operations (2016): 3,694
- Based aircraft: 6
- Source: Federal Aviation Administration

Roy Wilcox Airport (FAA LID: 5R1) is a public use airport in Washington County, Alabama, United States. The airport is owned by the town of Chatom and located three nautical miles (6 km) east of its central business district.

== Facilities and aircraft ==
Roy Wilcox Airport covers an area of 40 acres (16 ha) at an elevation of 165 feet (50 m) above mean sea level. It has one runway designated 12/30 with an asphalt surface measuring 4,000 by 80 feet (1,219 x 24 m).

For the 12-month period ending July 11, 2012, the airport had 3,694 general aviation aircraft operations, an average of 10 per day. At that time there were 7 aircraft based at this airport: 86% single-engine and 14% multi-engine.

== See also ==
- List of airports in Alabama
