= Double Springs–Winston County Airport =

Airport in Alabama, United States

- IATA: none; ICAO: none; FAA LID: 3M2

Summary
- Airport type: Public
- Owner: City and county
- Serves: Winston County, Alabama
- Location: Double Springs, Alabama
- Elevation AMSL: 753 ft (230 m)
- Coordinates: 34°08′40″N 087°19′40″W
- Interactive map of Double Springs–Winston County Airport

Runways
Direction	Length		Surface
Direction	ft	m	Surface
3/21	3,403	1,037	Asphalt

Statistics (2017)
- Aircraft operations: 3,750
- Based aircraft: 1
- Source: Federal Aviation Administration

Double Springs–Winston County Airport (FAA LID: 3M2) is a public-use airport located four nautical miles (5 mi, 7 km) east of Double Springs, a town in Winston County, Alabama, United States.

== Facilities and aircraft ==
Double Springs–Winston County Airport covers an area of 65 acres (26 ha) at an elevation of 753 feet (230 m) above mean sea level. It has one runway designated 3/21 with an asphalt surface measuring 3,403 by 79 feet (1,037 x 24 m).

For the 12 months period ending April 27, 2010, the airport had 3,750 general aviation aircraft's operations, an average of 10 per day. At that time there were six aircraft based at this airport: four single-engine, one jet, and one helicopter.

== See also ==
- List of airports in Alabama
