= Mark Reynolds/North Mobile County Airport =

- IATA: none; ICAO: none; FAA LID: 15A

Summary
- Airport type: Public
- Owner: Louis G. Buffkin
- Serves: Creola, Alabama
- Elevation AMSL: 60 ft / 18 m
- Coordinates: 30°54′33″N 087°59′47″W
- Interactive map of Mark Reynolds/North Mobile County Airport

Runways
Direction	Length		Surface
Direction	ft	m	Surface
3/21	2,000	610	Turf

Statistics (2017)
- Aircraft operations (2016): 8,570
- Based aircraft: 10
- Source: Federal Aviation Administration

Mark Reynolds/North Mobile County Airport (FAA LID: 15A) is a privately owned public-use airport in Mobile County, Alabama, United States. It is located three nautical miles (4 mi, 6 km) northeast of the central business district of Creola, Alabama.

== Facilities and aircraft ==
Mark Reynolds/North Mobile County Airport covers an area of 40 acres (16 ha) at an elevation of 60 feet (18 m) above mean sea level. It has one runway designated 3/21 with a turf surface measuring 2,000 by 180 feet (610 x 55 m).

For the 12-month period ending May 5, 2010, the airport had 8,570 aircraft operations, an average of 23 per day: 86% general aviation and 14% military. At that time there were 10 aircraft based at this airport, all single-engine.

== See also ==
- List of airports in Alabama
