= Reeves Airport =

- IATA: none; ICAO: none; FAA LID: ~~41A~~

Summary
- Airport type: Closed
- Owner: City of Tallassee
- Serves: Tallassee, Alabama
- Elevation AMSL: 326 ft / 99 m
- Coordinates: 32°30′54″N 085°52′34″W
- Interactive map of Reeves Airport

Runways
Direction	Length		Surface
Direction	ft	m	Surface
13/31	3,207	977	Asphalt

Statistics (2010)
- Aircraft operations: 4,580
- Based aircraft: 4
- Source: Federal Aviation Administration

Reeves Airport (FAA LID: 41A) was a city-owned public-use airport located two nautical miles (4 km) southeast of the central business district of Tallassee, a city in Tallapoosa County, Alabama, United States. The airport has been permanently closed.

== Facilities and aircraft ==
Reeves Airport covers an area of 425 acres (172 ha) at an elevation of 326 feet (99 m) above mean sea level. It has one runway designated 13/31 with an asphalt surface measuring 3,207 by 75 feet (977 x 23 m).

For the 12-month period ending October 13, 2010, the airport had 4,580 general aviation aircraft operations, an average of 12 per day. At that time there were four aircraft based at this airport: 75% single-engine and 25% multi-engine.

== See also ==
- List of airports in Alabama
