= Stevenson Airport =

- IATA: none; ICAO: none; FAA LID: 7A6

Summary
- Airport type: Public
- Owner: City of Stevenson
- Serves: Stevenson, Alabama
- Elevation AMSL: 644 ft / 196 m
- Coordinates: 34°53′11″N 085°48′12″W
- Interactive map of Stevenson Airport

Runways
Direction	Length		Surface
Direction	ft	m	Surface
5/23	4,103	1,251	Asphalt

Statistics (2020)
- Aircraft operations (year ending 3/31/2020): 6,440
- Based aircraft: 1
- Source: Federal Aviation Administration

Stevenson Airport (FAA LID: 7A6) is a city-owned public-use airport located two nautical miles (3.7 km) southwest of the central business district of Stevenson, a city in Jackson County, Alabama, United States.

== Facilities and aircraft ==
Stevenson Airport covers an area of 86 acres (35 ha) at an elevation of 644 feet (196 m) above mean sea level. It has one runway designated 5/23 with an asphalt surface measuring 4,103 by 80 feet (1,251 x 24 m).

For the 12-month period ending March 31, 2020, the airport had 6,440 aircraft operations, an average of 123 per week: 99% general aviation and 2% military. At that time there were 1 aircraft based at this airport: 1 single-engine.

== See also ==
- List of airports in Alabama
