= Eutaw Municipal Airport =

- IATA: none; ICAO: none; FAA LID: 3A7

Summary
- Airport type: Public
- Owner: Town of Eutaw
- Serves: Eutaw, Alabama
- Elevation AMSL: 170 ft (52 m)
- Coordinates: 32°49′14″N 087°51′54″W
- Interactive map of Eutaw Municipal Airport

Runways
Direction	Length		Surface
Direction	ft	m	Surface
16/34	3,600	1,097	Asphalt

Statistics (2017)
- Aircraft operations (2015): 6,420
- Based aircraft: 5
- Source: Federal Aviation Administration

Eutaw Municipal Airport (FAA LID: 3A7) is a city-owned, public-use airport located two nautical miles (4 km) southeast of the central business district of Eutaw, a city in Greene County, Alabama, United States. As of 8 December 2017, the airport is indefinitely closed.

== History ==
Eutaw Municipal Airport was built in April 1940, and it opened in the same month.

== Facilities and aircraft ==
Eutaw Municipal Airport covers an area of 48 acres (19 ha) at an elevation of 170 feet (52 m) above mean sea level. It has one runway designated 16/34 with an asphalt surface measuring 3,600 by 80 feet (1,097 x 24 m). For the 12-month period ending November 5, 2008, the airport had 6,420 general aviation aircraft operations, an average of 17 per day.

== See also ==
- List of airports in Alabama
