= Pine Hill Municipal Airport =

- IATA: none; ICAO: none; FAA LID: ~~71A~~

Summary
- Airport type: Closed
- Owner: Town of Pine Hill
- Serves: Pine Hill, Alabama
- Elevation AMSL: 123 ft / 37 m
- Coordinates: 31°58′08″N 087°35′45″W
- Interactive map of Pine Hill Municipal Airport

Runways
Direction	Length		Surface
Direction	ft	m	Surface
9/27	4,462	1,360	Asphalt

Statistics (2009)
- Aircraft operations: 300
- Source: Federal Aviation Administration

Pine Hill Municipal Airport (FAA LID: 71A) was a town-owned public-use airport located one nautical mile (2 km) south of the central business district of Pine Hill, a town in Wilcox County, Alabama, United States.

== Facilities and aircraft ==
Pine Hill Municipal Airport covers an area of 80 acres (32 ha) at an elevation of 123 feet (37 m) above mean sea level. It has one runway designated 9/27 with an asphalt surface measuring 4,462 by 80 feet (1,360 x 24 m). For the 12-month period ending August 20, 2009, the airport had 300 general aviation aircraft operations, an average of 25 per month. The airport has been permanently closed.

== See also ==
- List of airports in Alabama
