= McMinn Airport =

- IATA: none; ICAO: none; FAA LID: 25A

Summary
- Airport type: Public
- Owner: Pat McMinn
- Serves: Weaver, Alabama
- Elevation AMSL: 680 ft / 207 m
- Coordinates: 33°44′24″N 085°49′33″W
- Interactive map of McMinn Airport

Runways
Direction	Length		Surface
Direction	ft	m	Surface
8/26	2,650	808	Asphalt

Statistics (1998)
- Aircraft operations: 6,420
- Based aircraft: 24
- Source: Federal Aviation Administration

McMinn Airport (FAA LID: 25A) was a privately owned public-use airport located one nautical mile (1.85 km) southwest of the central business district of Weaver, a city in Calhoun County, Alabama, United States.

== Facilities and aircraft ==
McMinn Airport covers an area of 20 acres (8.1 ha) at an elevation of 680 feet (207 m) above mean sea level. It has one runway designated 8/26 with an asphalt surface measuring 2,650 by 30 feet (808 x 9 m).

For the 12-month period ending May 12, 1998, the airport had 6,420 aircraft operations, an average of 17 per day, all general aviation. At that time there were 24 aircraft based at this airport: 100% single-engine.

This airport has since been closed. It is no longer listed as active with the FAA, and the runway clearly has the closed "X" marks on it.

== See also ==
- List of airports in Alabama
