= Carl Folsom Airport =

Airport in Alabama, United States

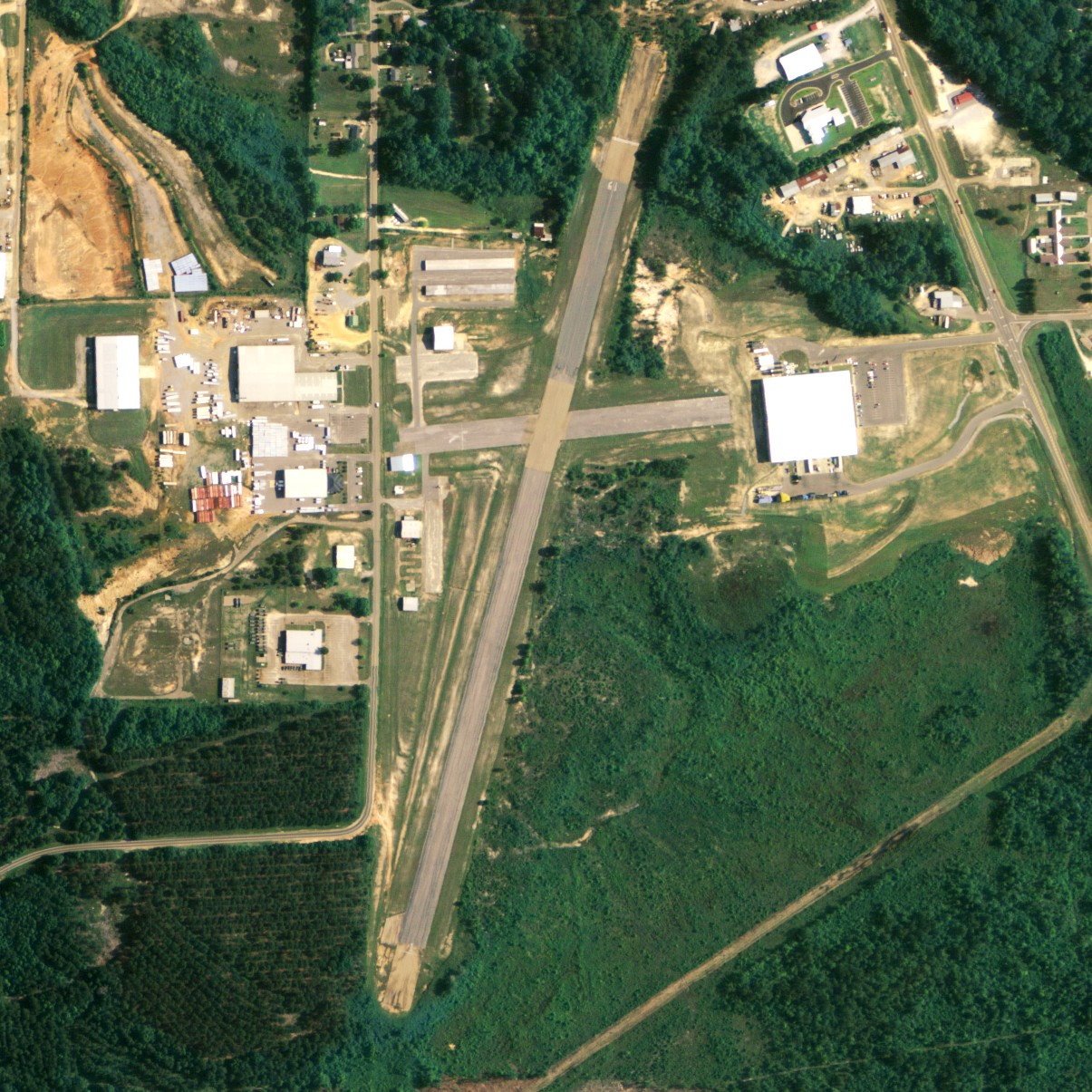
- NAIP aerial image, 30 June 2006
- IATA: none; ICAO: none; FAA LID: 14J

Summary
- Airport type: Public
- Owner: Elba Airport Authority
- Serves: Elba, Alabama
- Elevation AMSL: 258 ft (79 m)
- Coordinates: 31°24′36″N 086°05′25″W
- Interactive map of Carl Folsom Airport

Runways
Direction	Length		Surface
Direction	ft	m	Surface
1/19	3,050	930	Asphalt

Statistics (2017)
- Aircraft operations: 5,360
- Based aircraft: 22
- Source: Federal Aviation Administration

Carl Folsom Airport (FAA LID: 14J) is a public-use airport located two nautical miles (4 km) west of the central business district of Elba, a city in Coffee County, Alabama, United States. It is owned by the Elba Airport Authority.

This airport is included in the FAA's National Plan of Integrated Airport Systems for 2011–2015 and 2009–2013, both of which categorized it as a general aviation facility.

== Facilities and aircraft ==
Carl Folsom Airport covers an area of 171 acres (69 ha) at an elevation of 258 feet (79 m) above mean sea level. It has one runway designated 1/19 with an asphalt surface measuring 3,050 by 75 feet (930 x 23 m).

For the 12-month period ending December 9, 2010, the airport had 5,360 aircraft operations, an average of 14 per day: 95% general aviation and 5% military. At that time there were 18 aircraft based at this airport: 78% single-engine, 11% multi-engine, 6% jet and 6% helicopter.

== See also ==
- List of airports in Alabama
