= Posey Field =

Airport in Alabama, United States

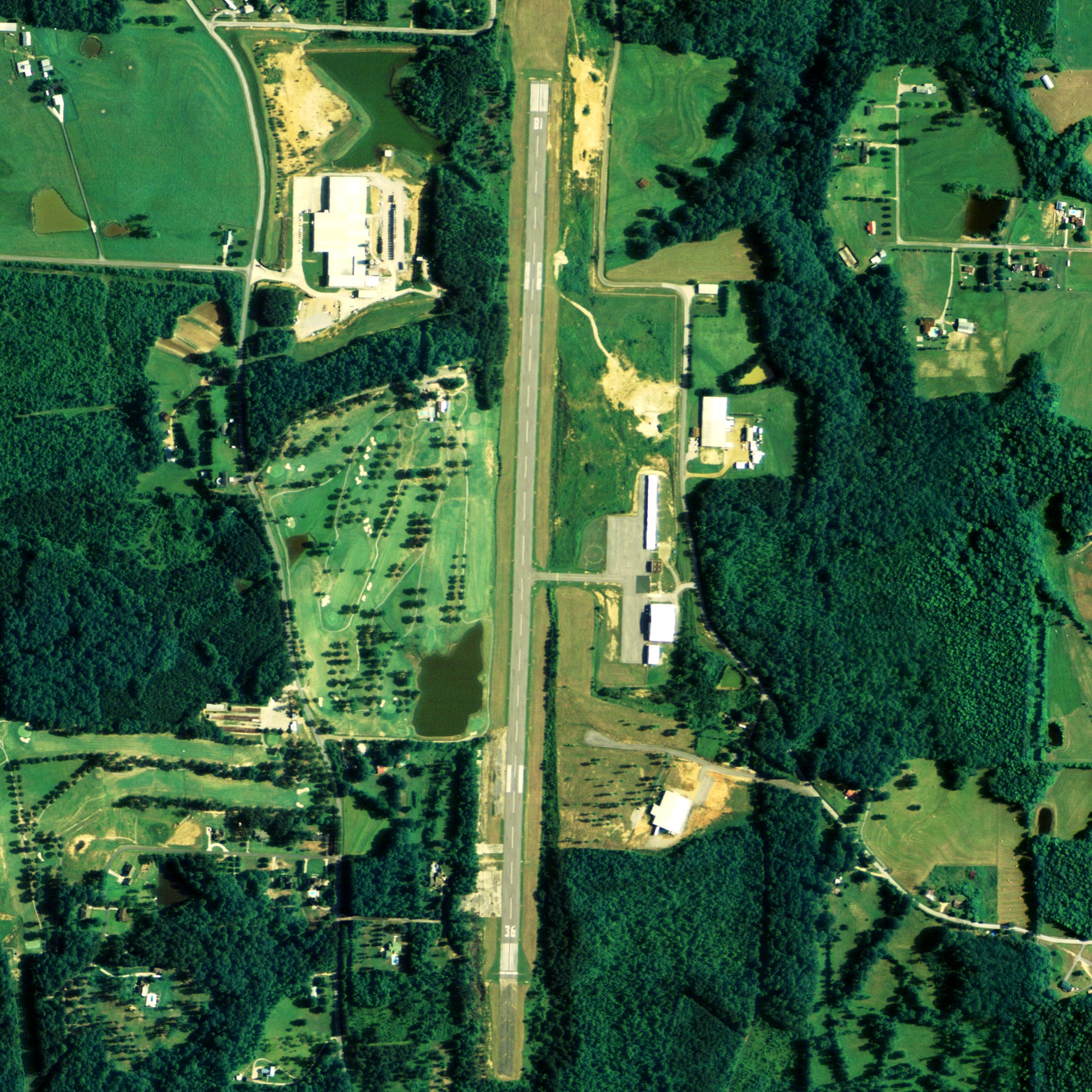
- NAIP aerial image, 20 June 2006
- IATA: none; ICAO: none; FAA LID: 1M4

Summary
- Airport type: Public
- Owner: City of Haleyville
- Serves: Haleyville, Alabama
- Elevation AMSL: 930 ft (280 m)
- Coordinates: 34°16′49″N 087°36′02″W
- Interactive map of Posey Field

Runways
| Direction | Length | | Surface |
| Direction | ft | m | Surface |
|---|---|---|---|
| 18/36 | 5,008 | 1,526 | Asphalt |

Statistics (2010)
- Aircraft operations: 10,185
- Based aircraft: 14
- Source: Federal Aviation Administration

Posey Field (FAA LID: 1M4) is a city-owned public-use airport located three nautical miles (4 mi, 6 km) northeast of the central business district of Haleyville, a city in Winston County, Alabama, United States.

This airport is included in the FAA's National Plan of Integrated Airport Systems for 2011–2015 and 2009–2013, both of which categorized it as a general aviation facility.

== Facilities and aircraft ==
Posey Field covers an area of 120 acres (49 ha) at an elevation of 930 feet (283 m) above mean sea level. It has one runway designated 18/36 with an asphalt surface measuring 5,008 by 100 feet (1,526 x 30 m).

For the 12-month period ending April 22, 2010, the airport had 10,185 general aviation aircraft operations, an average of 27 per day. At that time there were 14 aircraft based at this airport: 79% single-engine, 7% multi-engine, 7% jet and 7% ultralight.

== See also ==
- List of airports in Alabama
