= Freddie Jones Field =

- IATA: none; ICAO: none; FAA LID: 70A

Summary
- Airport type: Public
- Owner: City of Linden
- Serves: Linden, Alabama
- Elevation AMSL: 161 ft (49 m)
- Coordinates: 32°16′02″N 087°43′06″W
- Interactive map of Freddie Jones Field

Runways
Direction	Length		Surface
Direction	ft	m	Surface
18/36	3,390	1,033	Asphalt

Statistics (2010)
- Aircraft operations: 1,300
- Source: Federal Aviation Administration

Freddie Jones Field (FAA LID: 70A) is a city-owned, public-use airport located five nautical miles (6 mi, 9 km) southeast of the central business district of Linden, a city in Marengo County, Alabama, United States.

== Facilities and aircraft ==
Freddie Jones Field covers an area of 51 acres (21 ha) at an elevation of 161 feet (49 m) above mean sea level. It has one runway designated 18/36 with an asphalt surface measuring 3,390 by 80 feet (1,033 x 24 m). For the 12-month period ending May 3, 2010, the airport had 1,300 general aviation aircraft operations, an average of 108 per month.
