= Ardmore Airport (Alabama) =

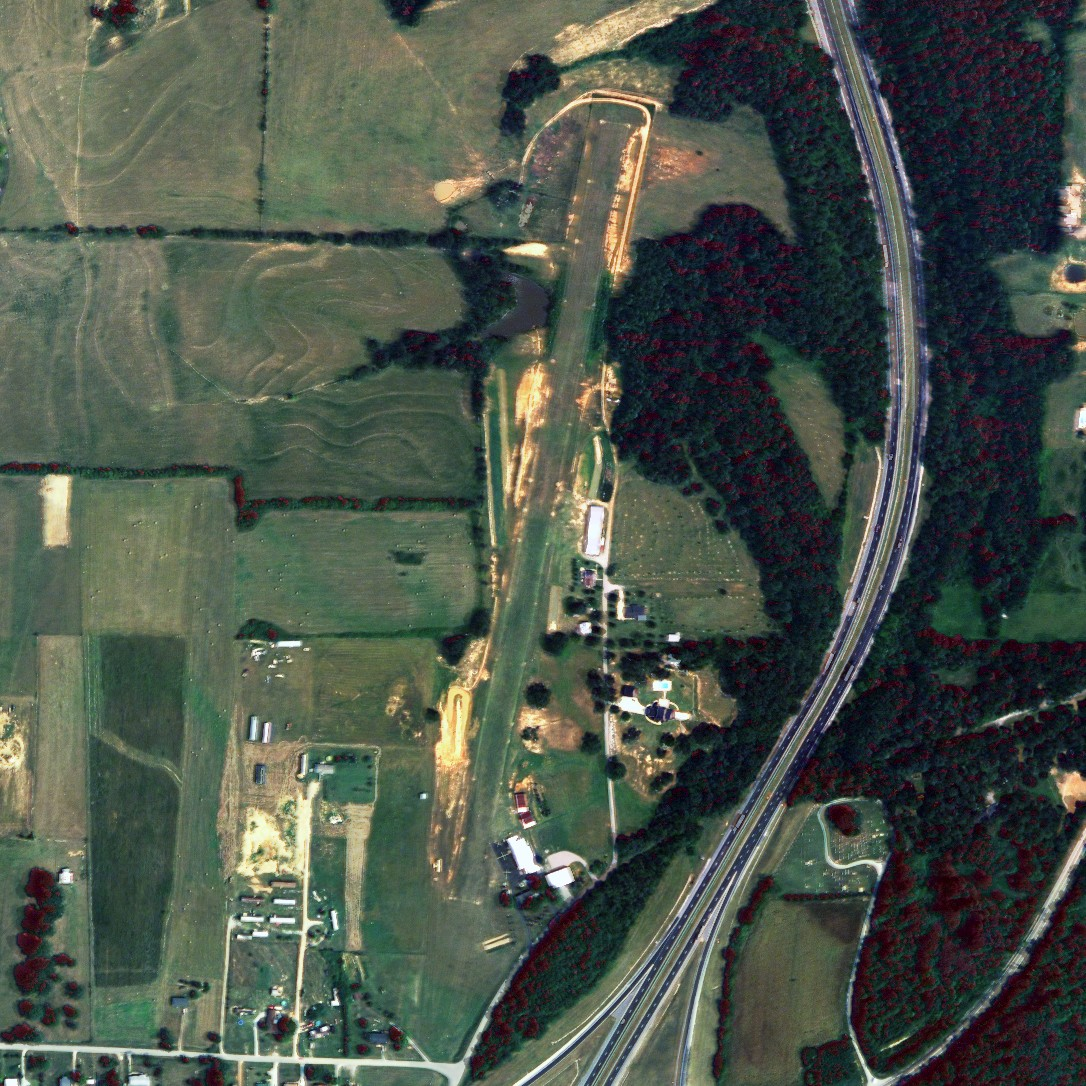
- NAIP aerial image, 24 August 2006
- IATA: none; ICAO: none; FAA LID: 1M3

Summary
- Owner: Loretta Trulson
- Serves: Ardmore, Alabama
- Elevation AMSL: 922 ft (281 m)
- Coordinates: 34°58′45″N 086°52′59″W
- Interactive map of Ardmore Airport

Runways
Direction	Length		Surface
Direction	ft	m	Surface
1/19	2,700	823	Turf

Statistics (2010)
- Aircraft operations: 2,260
- Based aircraft: 8
- Source: Federal Aviation Administration

Ardmore Airport (FAA LID: 1M3) is a privately owned airport, located two nautical miles (4 km) southwest of the central business district of Ardmore, a city in Limestone County, Alabama, United States. The airport is currently unlicensed by the State of Alabama.

== Facilities and aircraft ==
Ardmore Airport covers an area of 46 acres (19 ha) at an elevation of 922 feet (281 m) above mean sea level. It has one runway designated 1/19 with a turf surface measuring 2,700 by 100 feet (823 x 30 m).

For the 12-month period ending July 8, 2010, the airport had 2,260 aircraft operations, an average of 188 per month: 90% general aviation, 9% military, and 1% air taxi. At that time there were 8 aircraft based at this airport: 75% single-engine and 25% multi-engine.

== See also ==
- List of airports in Alabama
