= Robbins Airport (Wyoming) =

- IATA: none; ICAO: none; FAA LID: WY16

Summary
- Airport type: Private
- Owner/Operator: Dale Robbins
- Serves: Medicine Bow
- Location: Medicine Bow, Wyoming, United States of America
- Opened: February 1971
- Time zone: Mountain Standard Time (UTC−07:00)
  - Summer (DST): Mountain Daylight Time (UTC−06:00)
- Elevation AMSL: 2,207 m / 7,240 ft
- Coordinates: 42°15′34.5″N 105°51′30.7″W

Map
- Airport location in Wyoming, United States.

Runways
Direction	Length		Surface
Direction	m	ft	Surface
06/24	1,036	3,400	Dirt
12/30	610	2,000	Dirt

Statistics (2019)
- Aircraft based at Airport: 1
- Sources: SkyVector, AirNav; Statistics: AirNav

Robbins Airport is a small private airfield north of Medicine Bow, Wyoming. It is owned and operated by Dale Robbins.
