= National Agriculture Imagery Program =

The National Agriculture Imagery Program (NAIP) acquires aerial imagery during the agricultural growing seasons in the continental United States. It is administered by the USDA's Farm Service Agency (FSA) through the Aerial Photography Field Office (APFO) in Salt Lake City.

A primary goal of the NAIP program is to make digital ortho photography available to governmental agencies and the public within a year of acquisition. This "leaf-on" imagery is used as a base layer for GIS programs in the FSA's County Service Centers, and is used to maintain the Common Land Unit (CLU) boundaries. Projects are contracted each year based upon available funding and the FSA imagery acquisition cycle. Beginning in 2003, NAIP was acquired on a 5-year cycle. 2008 was a transition year, and a three-year cycle began in 2009. Since the NAIP program began in 2003, vendors have been transitioning to digital sensors in imagery acquisition. In 2009, most NAIP imagery will be acquired with digital sensors rather than film cameras.

NAIP imagery products are available either as digital ortho quarter quad tiles (DOQQs) or as compressed county mosaics (CCM). The area for DOQQs corresponds to the USGS topographic quadrangles. Each image tile covers a 3.75 x 3.75 minute quarter quadrangle plus a 300-meter buffer on all four sides. CCMs are generated by compressing DOQQ image tiles into a single mosaic. All individual tile images and the resulting mosaic are rectified in the UTM coordinate system, NAD 83, and cast into a single predetermined UTM zone.

NAIP imagery is typically acquired at a 1-meter (3.28 ft) ground sample distance (GSD) with a horizontal accuracy that matches within 6 meters (19.69 ft) of photo-identifiable ground control points, although these parameters do change over time. Starting in 2016, new imagery were acquired with a horizontal accuracy of +/-4 meters (13.12 ft), and starting in 2018, new imagery were acquired with GSD of 60 centimeters (1.97 ft). The default spectral resolution is natural color (Red, Green and Blue, or RGB) but beginning in 2007, some states have been delivered with four bands of data: RGB and Near Infrared. Images have no more than 10% cloud cover per quarter quad tile, weather conditions permitting.

== Potential changes in licensing ==
The FSA is considering a program change to availability and licensing for products of the NAIP beyond the 2018 fiscal year. Under review are a switch from a public domain program to a Commercial off-the-shelf (COTS) licensing model. This change would require all users to begin paying for services and data, an effort that the FSA hopes would supplement 2018 budget reductions and lapses in funding from cost-share partners.

A final decision, originally expected on May 1, 2018, was delayed in order to give the FSA additional time to research options for continuing the program. At issue is the acquisition strategy for the data. Options under discussion include eliminating full state coverage to acquire agriculture-only land, restricting coverage to “high value” agriculture states, and/or using the COTS licensing model. FSA and the Office of Management and Budget (OMB) would continue to work towards a positive solution that benefits all stakeholders. The delayed decision meant that the NAIP would remain a public domain program for image data acquired through 2019.
