= Gunter Annex =

US Air Force installation in Alabama

- Part of Maxwell Air Force Base
- Montgomery, Alabama in the United States
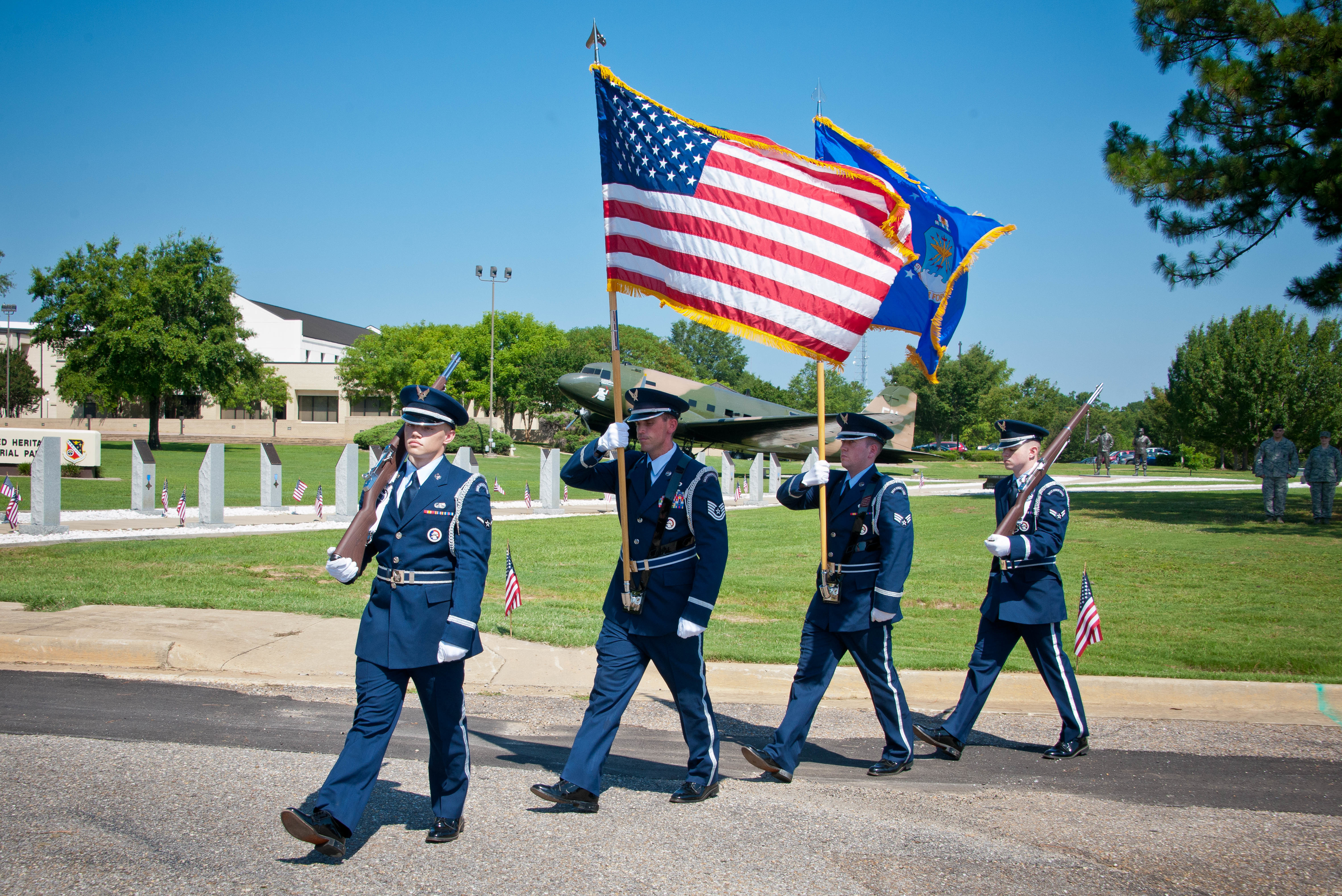
- The Maxwell-Gunter Honor Guard at Gunter Annex

Site information
- Type: US Air Force facility
- Owner: Department of Defense
- Operator: US Air Force
- Controlled by: Air Education and Training Command
- Condition: Operational
- Website: Official website (Maxwell AFB)

Location
- Location within Alabama Location within the United States
- Coordinates: 32°24′39″N 86°15′07″W

Site history
- Built: 1940 (as Gunter Field)
- In use: 1940 – present

Garrison information
- Garrison: 42nd Air Base Wing

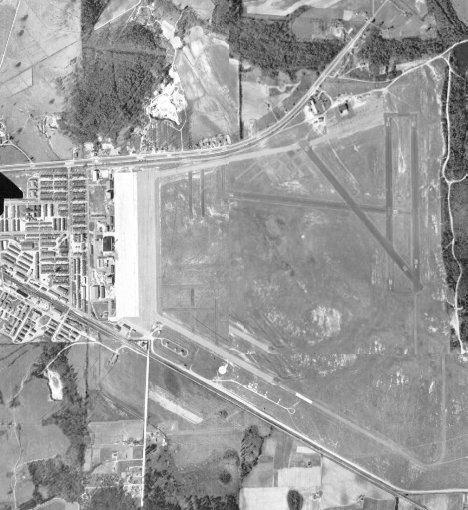
Gunter Air Force Base – 17 February 1950

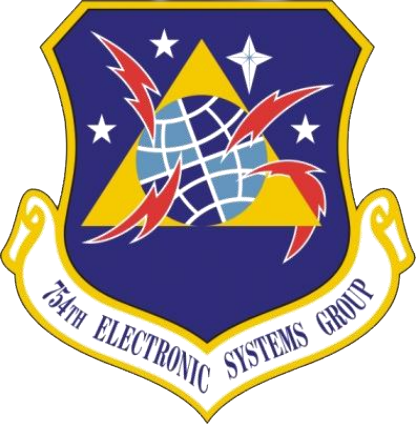
Emblem of the 754th ELSG

Gunter Annex is a United States Air Force installation located in the North-northeast suburbs of Montgomery, Alabama. The base is named after former Montgomery mayor William Adams Gunter. Until 1992 it was known as Gunter Air Force Base or Gunter Air Force Station. It has been a military training base since its opening in 1940.

Gunter Annex is a subordinate installation under the administration of the 42d Air Base Wing at nearby Maxwell Air Force Base.

== Overview ==
Gunter Annex is the home of the Business and Enterprise Systems (BES) Directorate. The BES provides and supports secure combat information systems and networks for the United States Air Force, the Department of Defense and other Federal Government Agencies.

The BES Directorate is a part of the Air Force Life Cycle Management Center (AFLCMC), which is headquartered at Wright-Patterson AFB, Ohio, and its subordinate activity at Hanscom AFB, Massachusetts.

The 26th Network Operations Squadron provides network defense for the Air Force Enterprise Network (AFNET). The 689th Network Operations Squadron is a Classic Associate Unit to the 26th NOS and is also located on the Annex but falls under Air Force Reserve Command.

The host unit of Gunter Annex is the 42d Air Base Wing, headquartered at Maxwell AFB. The former 42d Bombardment Wing took over host duties at both Maxwell AFB and Gunter AFB on 1 October 1994 when the wing was redesignated and reassigned from the closing of Loring Air Force Base, Maine.

== History ==
=== William Adams Gunter ===
The facility is named after William Adams Gunter (1871–1940), a long-time mayor of Montgomery Alabama. Mayor Gunter was an aviation advocate who championed aviation and was a major force behind the construction of the original Montgomery Municipal Airport at this site in 1929. There were several efforts to have the airport officially named in his honor while he was still living. Although he successfully resisted these efforts, the site is still commonly referred to by residents as 'Gunter Field'.

=== World War II ===
In 1940, the 'Plan for the Expansion of the Air Corps Training Program' was published and indicated a need for a preliminary flying school in the Montgomery area. The Commandant of the Air Corps Tactical School at Maxwell Field, Colonel Walter Weaver, picked the Montgomery Municipal Airport and the surrounding area as the location for the flying school. This included a newly built, but as yet unoccupied state hospital for tuberculosis patients. In June 1940, the War Department approved the recommendation to lease the land.

In August 1940 the first military personnel arrived and construction began. The hospital was used as a headquarters building and Colonel Aubrey Hornsby was the project officer and later the first commanding officer. The Army leased the 187 acre municipal airport and purchased an additional 300 acres for the cantonment area. Complicated leasing agreements delayed construction and the Army facilities were not completed in time, so the first two classes, Class 41-A with 107 students and Class 41-B, trained at Maxwell Field on the other side of town. The first class to train at Gunter was 41-C which began instruction on 28 November 1940.

In late 1940, Mayor Gunter died and, on the recommendation of Colonel Hornsby, the flying field was officially named "Gunter Field" in early 1941. By July 1941, construction of the field was largely complete. In addition to the main airfield, the following known sub-bases and auxiliaries were used:

- McLemore Auxiliary Field 32°22′30″N 086°07′10″W
- Elmore Auxiliary Field (now Wetumpka Municipal Airport) 32°31′46″N 86°19′42″W
- Mount Meigs Auxiliary Field 32°21′30″N 86°01′30″W
- Taylor Field 32°18′15″N 86°07′20″W
- Dannelly Auxiliary Field 32°18′04″N 86°23′25″W
- Deatsville Auxiliary Field 32°35′41″N 86°26′52″W

In 1943, 3,500 foot long hard surfaced runways were added.

Gunter Field 1942 Classbook

Gunter Field 1943 photo pictorial

Gunter was the first base established by the Southeastern Training Center exclusively for Basic Flight Training. As such, it also trained instructors and other personnel for the other Basic Training bases opened in the Southeast that included Cochran AAF in Macon, Georgia; Bainbridge AB, Georgia; Greenville AAF, Mississippi; Shaw AAF in Sumter, South Carolina; and at Augusta, Georgia's civilian-run Bush Field. Students would come to Basic Flight Training after completing Primary Training. In 1941, the Basic course was 10 weeks in length in which the student received 70 flying hours. After completion of the course, students would be chosen for advanced single or multi-engine training.

During World War II, the field served as a flying school for not just Army pilots, but for British (under the Arnold Scheme), French and Canadians as well. By 1944, there were nearly four hundred aircraft assigned to Gunter Field. The primary aircraft used for Basic Training, by both the Army and the Navy, during most of the war was the fixed gear Vultee BT-13 and BT-15 Valiant. By later 1944, the BT-13s and 15s were worn out and they began to be replaced by the North American AT-6 Texan.

After World War II ended, flight training was transferred to Spence AAF (Georgia) and, other than some contingents of French and Chinese flight students, aviation training ended at Gunter. By February 1946, Gunter's remaining aircraft were transferred to Maxwell Army Air Base and the field went to "stand by" status.

In January 1948 Gunter Field was redesignated Gunter Air Force Base. In May 1950, the Air University located its Extension Course Institute there. In October of that year, a branch of the School of Aviation Medicine was also established.

=== Air Defense Command ===
In 1957 a Semi Automatic Ground Environment (SAGE) Data Center (DC-09) was established at Gunter AFB. The SAGE system was an early generation computer network linking Air Force (and later FAA) United States general surveillance radar stations into a centralized center for continental air defense, intended to provide early warning and response for a Soviet nuclear attack. It was initially under the Montgomery Air Defense Sector (MoADS), established on 8 September 1957. MoADS was synonymous with 32nd NORAD Region, which encompassed an area from the Cuban landmass north to Florida, Georgia, Alabama, Mississippi and Louisiana. MoADS was a blockhouse with 18 inch thick steel-reinforced concrete walls designed to withstand anything but a direct nuclear hit. There were 4 floors, with the bottom floor for inputs, the second floor for computer systems, and the fourth floor for operations.

SAGE sites had twin AN/FSQ-7 computers that encompassed an area the size of a football field. These IBM-built systems were tube-based with wire and washer memory banks. IBM also built in excellent diagnostics and redundancy, so the system should always be operational. The memory was 64K, with the incoming radar information storage was on magnetic drums and the maximum response overload before collapse was around 45 seconds.

In the 1960s, MoADS also assisted in hosting William Tell, a then-annual competition of Air Defense Command (ADC), later Aerospace Defense Command (ADC), and Royal Canadian Air Force fighter-interceptor squadrons that was held at Tyndall AFB, Florida. In the 1960s, this competition included live shoot-downs of Firebee aerial target drones launched from Tyndall AFB, and obsolescent QB-47E Stratojet bombers and BOMARC missiles launched from nearby Eglin AFB, Florida.

On 16 December 1960, the SAGE facility at Gunter controlled two BOMARC-B missiles launched from Eglin AFB and directed their interception of a QB-47E Stratojet drone flying at 500 mph at 30,000 feet.

William Tell also showcased various air defense development programs. One was the Mach 3+ YF-12 interceptor that later became the basis for the SR-71 strategic reconnaissance aircraft. In the early 1960s, a YF-12 would launch from Edwards AFB, California, climb to around 70,000 feet and intercept a drone over the Gulf of Mexico that was launched Eglin AFB, shoot it down, and then return to Edwards AFB. This was a spectacular show of advanced technology of that time.

MoADS was inactivated on 1 April 1966 and redesignated as the 32d Air Division. DC-09 with its AN/FSQ-7 computer remained under the 32d Air Division until it and the Air Division were inactivated on 31 December 1969 when technology advances allowed the Air Force to shut down many SAGE Data Centers.

=== Gunter Annex ===
In 1971, nearly 800 acres (3.2 km^{2}) of Gunter were returned to the city of Montgomery. In that year the Air Force Data Systems Design Center moved there and in 1972 the Senior Noncommissioned Officer Academy came to Gunter. In early 1973, Gunter was redesignated an "Air Force Station".

In 1976, Gunter received one of the early Arpanet drops which is the precursor to the internet as it is known today. The 1977 Arpanet Logic Map illustrates the drop in the bottom center of the picture.

Major construction was undertaken in the 1980s and 1990s, thanks to the advocacy of Congressman William Dickinson, and in 1988 Gunter was redesignated an "Air Force Base". The primary tenants were still the Extension Course Institute, the Senior Noncommissioned Officer Academy and the Air Force Data Systems Design Center.

In March 1992, Gunter was again redesignated, this time as Maxwell Air Force Base, Gunter Annex, and now falls under the command of nearby Maxwell Air Force Base.

=== Previous names ===
- Army Air Corps Basic Flying School, Municipal Airport, Montgomery, Alabama, 27 August 1940
- Gunter Field, 10 February 1941
- Gunter Air Force Base, 13 January 1948
- Gunter Air Force Station, 1 February 1973
- Gunter Air Force Base, 1 July 1988
- Maxwell Air Force Base, Gunter Annex, 1 March 1992

=== Major commands to which assigned ===
- Southeast Air Corps Training Center, 27 August 1940
- Air Corps Flying Training Command, 23 January 1942

Re-designated: Army Air Forces Flying Training Command, 15 March 1942

- Army Air Forces Training Command, 31 July 1943
- Army Air Forces School, 15 December 1945
- Re-designated: Air University, 12 Mar 1946
- Air Training Command, 15 May 1978

Re-designated: Air Education and Training Command, 1 July 1993

=== Major ADCOM units assigned ===
- Montgomery Air Defense Sector, 8 September 1957 – 1 April 1966

Redesignated: 32d Air Division, 1 April 1966 – 31 December 1969

- Fourteenth Air Force, 1 April 1966 – 1 July 1968

== Education ==
Maxwell Air Force Base properties are zoned to Department of Defense Education Activity (DoDEA) schools for grades K-8. The DoDEA operates Maxwell Air Force Base Elementary/Middle School. High school students are zoned to Montgomery Public Schools, with Dr. Percy L. Julian High School (formerly Robert E. Lee High School) as the zoned high school for the Gunter Annex. By 2019, the Autauga County Schools and Elmore County Public School System began to allow Maxwell AFB on post families to send their children to their schools. In 2019 Pike Road Schools's board of trustees agreed to allow Maxwell AFB on-post families to send their children to Pike Road High School.

== See also ==
- Alabama World War II Army Airfields
- 74th Flying Training Wing (World War II)
- United States general surveillance radar stations
