= Maxwell Air Force Base =

United States Air Force base in Montgomery, Alabama

- Montgomery, Alabama in the United States of America
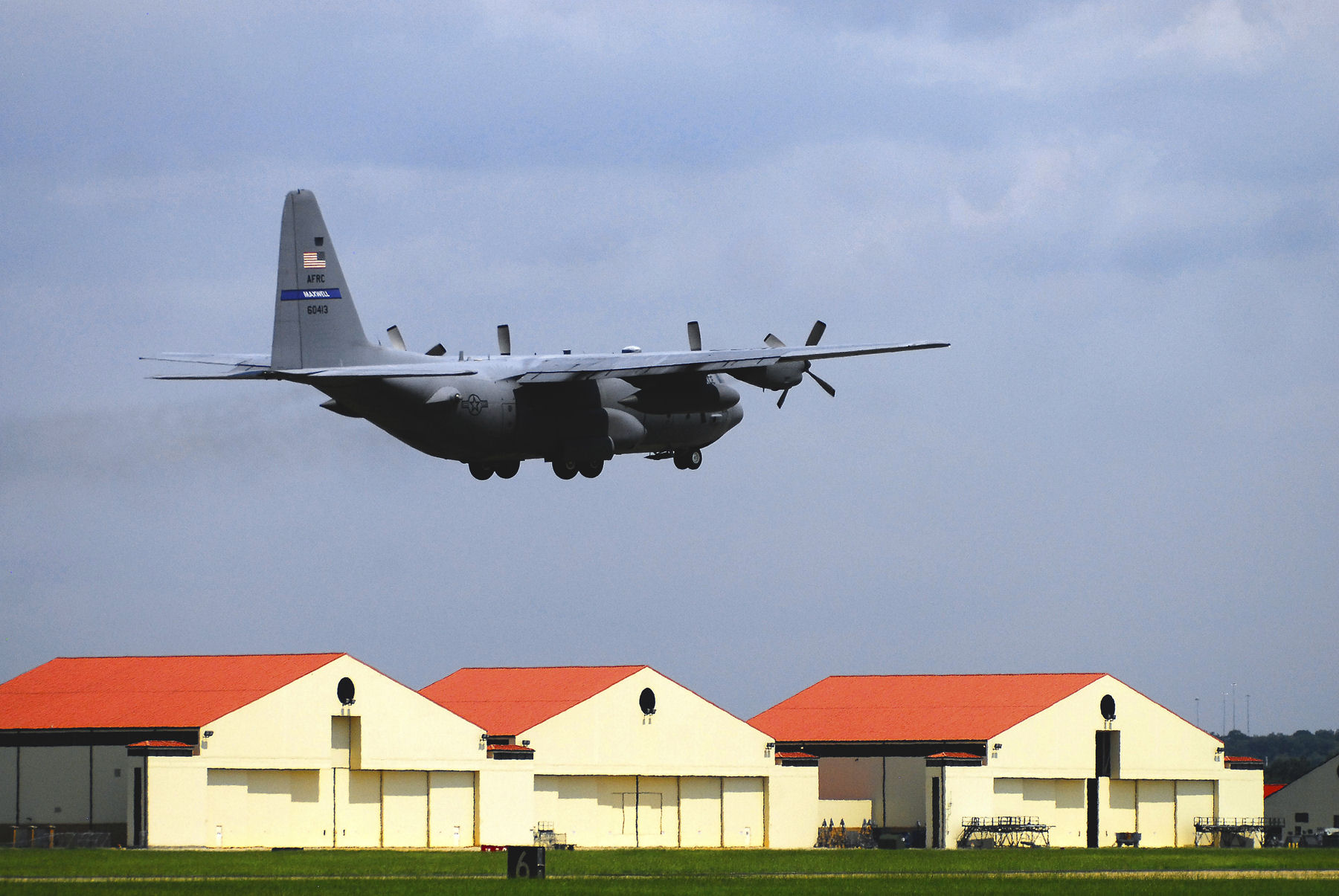
- A C-130 Hercules aircraft of the 908th Airlift Wing takes off from Maxwell AFB with the wing's maintenance hangars in the background.

Site information
- Type: US Air Force base
- Owner: Department of Defense
- Operator: US Air Force (USAF)
- Controlled by: Air Education and Training Command (AETC)
- Condition: Operational
- Website: www.maxwell.af.mil

Location
- Location within Alabama Location within the United States Location within North America
- Coordinates: 32°22′45″N 86°21′45″W

Site history
- Built: 1910 (as the Wright Flying School)
- In use: 1910 – present

Garrison information
- Current commander: Colonel Ryan Richardson
- Garrison: 42nd Air Base Wing (host)

Airfield information
- Identifiers: IATA: MXF, ICAO: KMXF, FAA LID: MXF, WMO: 722265
- Elevation: 52.1 metres (171 ft) AMSL
Runways
Direction	Length and surface
15/33	2,440.8 metres (8,008 ft) asphalt
Landing zone	918.9 metres (3,015 ft) asphalt

Maxwell Air Force Base (IATA: MXF, ICAO: KMXF, FAA LID: MXF), officially known as Maxwell-Gunter Air Force Base, is a United States Air Force (USAF) installation under the Air Education and Training Command (AETC). The installation is located in Montgomery, Alabama, United States. Occupying the site of the first Wright Flying School, it was named in honor of Second Lieutenant William C. Maxwell, a native of Atmore, Alabama.

The base is the headquarters of Air University (AU), a major component of Air Education and Training Command (AETC), and is the U.S. Air Force's center for Joint Professional Military Education (PME). The host wing for Maxwell-Gunter is the 42d Air Base Wing (42 ABW).

The Air Force Reserve Command's 908th Flying Training Wing (formerly Airlift Wing) is a tenant unit and the only operational flying unit at Maxwell. The 908 FTW supervises the 703d Helicopter Squadron (703 HS). The wing used to operate eight C-130H Hercules aircraft for theater airlift worldwide. As an AFRC airlift unit, the 908th used to be operationally-gained by the Air Mobility Command (AMC).

Gunter Annex is a separate installation under the 42 ABW. Originally known as Gunter Field, it later became known as Gunter Air Force Station (Gunter AFS) when its runways were closed and its operational flying activity eliminated. It was later renamed Gunter Air Force Base (Gunter AFB) during the 1980s. As a hedge against future Base Realignment and Closure (BRAC) closure actions, Gunter AFB was consolidated under Maxwell AFB in March 1992 to create a combined installation known as Maxwell/Gunter AFB.

Maxwell AFB is also the site of Federal Prison Camp, Montgomery, a minimum security facility for male inmates.

== History ==
=== Origins ===
Toward the end of February 1910, the Wright Brothers decided to open one of the world's earliest flying schools at the site that would subsequently become Maxwell AFB. The Wrights taught the principles of flying, including take-offs, balancing, turns, and landings. The Wright Flying School closed on 26 May 1910.

The field served as a repair depot during World War I. In fact, the depot built the first plane made in Montgomery and exhibited it at the field on 20 September 1918. Repair activity at the depot was sharply curtailed at the end of the war.

=== Interwar years ===
The Aviation Repair Depot's land was leased by the U.S. Army during World War I, and later purchased on 11 January 1920 for $34,327. Diminished postwar activity caused the U.S. War Department in 1919 to announce that it planned to close thirty-two facilities around the country, including the Aviation Repair Depot. In 1919, the Aviation Repair Depot had a $27,000 monthly civilian payroll, and was a vital part of the city's economy. The loss of the field would have been a serious blow to the local Montgomery economy. The field remained open into the early 1920s only because the War Department was slow in closing facilities. After this initial reprieve, the War Department announced in 1922 that facilities on the original closure list would indeed close in the very near future. City officials were not surprised to hear that Aviation Repair Depot remained on the list, because 350 civilian employees had been laid off in June 1921.

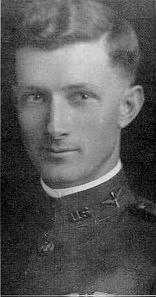
Second Lieutenant William C. Maxwell, for whom the base is named

On 8 November 1922, the War Department redesignated the depot as Maxwell Field in honor of Atmore, Alabama native, Second Lieutenant William C. Maxwell. On 12 August 1920, engine trouble forced Lieutenant Maxwell to attempt to land his DH-4 in a sugarcane field in the Philippines. Maneuvering to avoid a group of children playing below, he struck a flagpole hidden by the tall sugarcane and was killed instantly. On the recommendation of his former commanding officer, Major Roy C. Brown, the Montgomery Air Intermediate Depot, Montgomery, Alabama, was renamed Maxwell Field. In 1923, it was one of three U.S. Army Air Service aviation depots. Maxwell Field repaired aircraft engines in support of flying training missions such as those at Taylor Field, southeast of Montgomery.

Maxwell Field, as most Army air stations and depots developed during World War I, was on leased properties with temporary buildings being the mainstay of construction. These temporary buildings/shacks were built to last two to five years. By the mid-1920s, these dilapidated wartime buildings had become a national disgrace. Congressional investigations also showed that the manning strength of the U.S. Army's air arm was seriously deficient. These critical situations eventually led to the Air Corps Act of 1926 and the two major programs that dramatically transformed Army airfields. The Air Corps Act changed the name and status of the Army Air Service to the U.S. Army Air Corps and authorized a five-year expansion program. In the late 1920s and early 1930s, this program and its companion, the 1926 Army Housing Program, produced well-designed, substantial, permanent buildings and infrastructure at all Army airfields retained after World War I.

Taking up the cause of Maxwell Field was freshman Congressman J. Lister Hill, a World War I veteran who served with the 17th and 71st U.S. Infantry Regiments. He, as well as other Montgomery leaders, recognized the historical significance of the Wright Brother's first military flying school and the potential of Maxwell Field to the local economy. In 1925 Hill, a member of the House Military Affairs Committee, affixed an amendment to a military appropriations bill providing $200,000 for the construction of permanent buildings at Maxwell Field. This amendment did not have the approval of the War Department nor the Army Air Corps, but as a result of this massive spending on Maxwell Field, the War Department kept it open. Hill recognized that to keep Maxwell Field open, it needed to be fiscally or militarily valuable to the War Department.

In September 1927, Hill met with Major General Mason M. Patrick, chief of the Army Air Corps, and his assistant, Brigadier General James E. Fechet, to discuss the placement of an attack group at Maxwell Field. Both made it clear that Maxwell Field was too close to Montgomery and was not a suitable location for an attack group. In fact, they asked Hill as "a friend of the Air Corps" not to "embarrass" the Corps by asking that the group be placed there. They warned that if he persisted, they would "very much oppose" the effort. However, General Patrick not wanting to alienate the new and up and coming Congressman (who was also a member of the House Military Affairs Committee) sought to appease Hill by offering to create an observation squadron at Maxwell Field. Hill welcomed the gesture; however, the creation of an observation squadron fell short of the long term on-going mission sought by Hill for Maxwell Field.

Hill continued to argue for the attack group to be placed at Maxwell Field. He argued that because of the permanent buildings scheduled to be built, it would be fiscally advantageous for the placement of the attack group at Maxwell Field. Hill's arguments were an extension of ones that had been presented to him by Major Roy S. Brown, former commandant of Maxwell Field from 1922 to 1925. In 1927, Major Brown was the commander of the Air Corps Tactical School located at Langley Field, Virginia. Major Brown urged Hill to keep his name out of it because of the easily traceable insider information. Hill, frustrated with the lack of positive response from Generals Patrick and Fechet, moved up the chain of command and passed on the correspondence he had with General Fechet to Secretary of War Dwight Davis, Assistant Secretary of War for Air F. Trubee Davison, and Army Chief of Staff Charles P. Summerall. His request to them was given the answer: that they would give the matter "full consideration."

The depot's first official flying mission was carried out after that. Observation missions originated there in 1927–1929. Pilots from the field were also involved in completing the first leg of a test designed to establish an airmail route between the Gulf Coast and the northern Great Lakes area. The successful test played a major role in the eventual establishment of permanent airmail service in the Southeast.

By early 1928, the decision of basing a new Army Air Corps attack group had come down to Shreveport, Louisiana, and Montgomery. Both cities vied for the federal money to be spent in their respective local areas, but Shreveport the more economically developed city than its counterpart Montgomery won the day. In April 1928, Hill, via his contacts in the War Department, found out that Montgomery would not be getting the attack group. Flexing his congressional muscle, Hill persuaded Assistant Secretary Davidson and now chief of the Air Corps Major General Fechet to hold off the official announcement until Montgomery had a second look by the War Department. During the interim Montgomery leaders had set forth actions to acquire over 600 acres (2 km^{2}) for Maxwell Field's expansion in hopes of wooing the War Department into placing the attack group in Montgomery.

In May 1928 General Benjamin Foulois, General Fechet's assistant, during an inspection visit with Third Army commander General Frank Parker to Maxwell Field mentioned that the Air Corps Tactical School would be moving from Langley Field to a still undecided location. During his stay General Foulois met with local Chamber of Commerce chairman Jesse Hearin and Maxwell Field post commandant, Major Walter R. Weaver. Hearin and Weaver touted the feasibility of Maxwell Field and the Montgomery area for the placement of the attack group at Maxwell Field. However, General Foulois guided the conversation towards the impending movement of the Air Corps Tactical School and he favored Maxwell Field for the new home. Hearin immediately worked up an option on another one thousand acres (4 km²) for the Air Corps Tactical School should Montgomery not be favored with the attack group.

In July 1928, word "via rumor" of the decision for the establishment of an attack group came out that Shreveport was indeed the victor of the final decision. In December 1928, after much debate and political maneuvering it was announced officially by the Assistant Secretary of War that Shreveport would be getting the attack group and that the Army Air Corps Tactical School (ACTS) would be coming to Maxwell Field. The move to Maxwell Field from Langley Field was initially expected to increase Maxwell Field's population by eighty officers and 300 enlisted. It was expected that the ACTS would be to the Army Air Corps what Fort Benning, Georgia was to the infantry.

On 15 January 1929, it was announced that the ACTS would be twice as large as originally planned. On 11 February, it was announced that $1,644,298 had been allowed for ACTS construction. This was not including an additional $324,000 the Secretary of War had approved previously for non-commissioned officer barracks and a school building after a conference with Congressman Hill. On 12 March, a conference between a Major Kennedy, Chief of Buildings and Grounds of the Army Air Corps and commandant of the ACTS, and Congressman Lister Hill to determine the locations of the buildings and types of construction. In March 1929, personnel at Maxwell provided flood relief to citizens of Montgomery. This was the first time at which food and supplies were airdropped by U.S. military forces during a major civilian emergency.

On 9 July 1929, Captain Walter J. Reed and a battery of attorneys checked titles for the land. The War Department also announced the same day that the plan had changed to where the ACTS would now be four times as large as originally planned with 200 officers and 1,000 enlisted men. At the time, this made Maxwell Field the largest (as far as personnel) Army Air Corps installation in the southeast. Approximately 300 signatures to the deed of the land occupied by the Air Corps Tactical School were signed, of which one was signed by a minor. Chairman of the Montgomery Chamber of Commerce James Hearin said, "...several cases had to be taken to court." Despite the obvious rush for signatures, by 5 October, deeds to the land were signed and mailed to the War Department.

On 17 December 1929, Congressman Lister Hill introduced a bill to appropriate $320,000 for the acquiring of 1,075 acres (4 km^{2}) of land in Montgomery County as a part of an expansion program for Maxwell Field. This was a particularly bold move at the time by Hill because of the stock market crash. Effects of the crash had yet to take place; however, the panic caused by the crash had certainly captured Montgomery's attention.

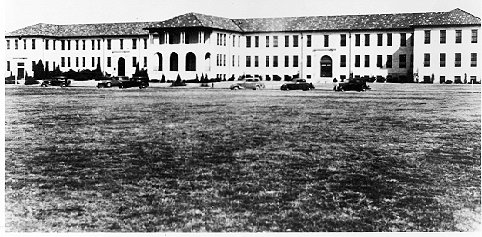
Austin Hall was built in 1931 to serve as the Air Corps Tactical School's main building.

On 25 January 1930, President Herbert Hoover asked Congress to re-appropriate an additional $100,000 for the main school building at Maxwell Field. President Hoover's policy was to speed public works to offset unemployment. In February 1930, Congressman Hill's resolution was passed in the House of Representatives and 80 acres (320,000 m^{2}) were to be added to Maxwell Field for expansion purposes. George B. Ford and Frederick Law Olmsted Jr., were hired by the Army Quartermaster Corps and they designed the overall layout of ACTS at Maxwell. Ford used an approach that clustered similar functions together. This technique provided plenty of open space and gave each cluster a distinct appearance.

On 17 September 1931, the first ACTS training occurred at Maxwell Field. Forty-one students met at 8:40 a.m. in the operations office conference room for general instruction. Classes were divided into sections, with some pilots sent on check flights, while others were sent out to become familiar with the surrounding countryside to become familiar with emergency landing field locations.

On the morning of 22 September 1931, opening exercises of the Air Corps Tactical School were held. On 24 September, the Air Corps Tactical School was officially launched. The address was made by Major General James E. Fechet, chief of the Army Air Corps also attending were Congressman Lister Hill and commandant of the Air Corps Tactical School, Major John F. Curry. General Fechet, along with announcing his impending retirement, declared that the forty-one student officers could be future generals of the Air Corps. At a later luncheon, General Fechet also lauded Montgomery's attitude toward the Air Corps.

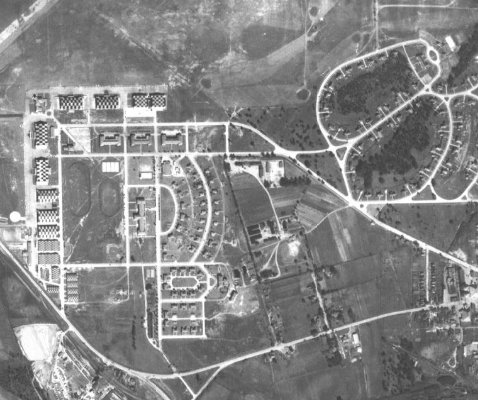
Overhead Maxwell Field in 1937

The 1931-1932 faculty included Army Air Corps (AC), Army Infantry (Inf), Army Chemical Warfare Service (CWS), and Army Field Artillery (FA) instructors. Initially, the school's curriculum reflected the dominating influence of Brigadier General Billy Mitchell. Mitchell was a strong believer in the importance of gaining and maintaining air superiority during a conflict. He argued strongly for pursuit (e.g., "fighter") aircraft in combination with bombers and regarded enemy pursuit forces as the most serious threat to successful bombing operations and felt that the task of American pursuit was not necessarily to escort bombers, but to also seek out and attack enemy fighters. During the first five years of the school's operation, Mitchell's beliefs formed the basis for instruction at the tactical school. However, by the mid-1930s the school's emphasis had shifted from pursuit to bombardment aviation.

On 16 July 1933, Congressman Lister Hill secured approval from the War Department for $1,650,075 for immediate spending at Maxwell Field. Hill's request was justified by increased enrollment at the Air Corps Tactical School and the desperate need for employment for the local Montgomery population. At the start of October 1933 bids opened for four construction projects that were to start immediately; 1933-1934 construction at Maxwell Field later employed an average of more than 500 workers.

The Air Corps Tactical School opened 15 July 1931. The school evolved into the Army Air Corps (later, U.S. Air Force's) first tactical center until the imminence of American involvement in World War II forced a suspension of classes in June 1940 that resulted in permanent closure of the school. One of the school's notable achievements was its development of two aerial acrobatic teams: the "Three Men on a Flying Trapeze", put together by then-Captain Claire L. Chennault in 1932, and the Skylarks in 1935.

=== World War II ===
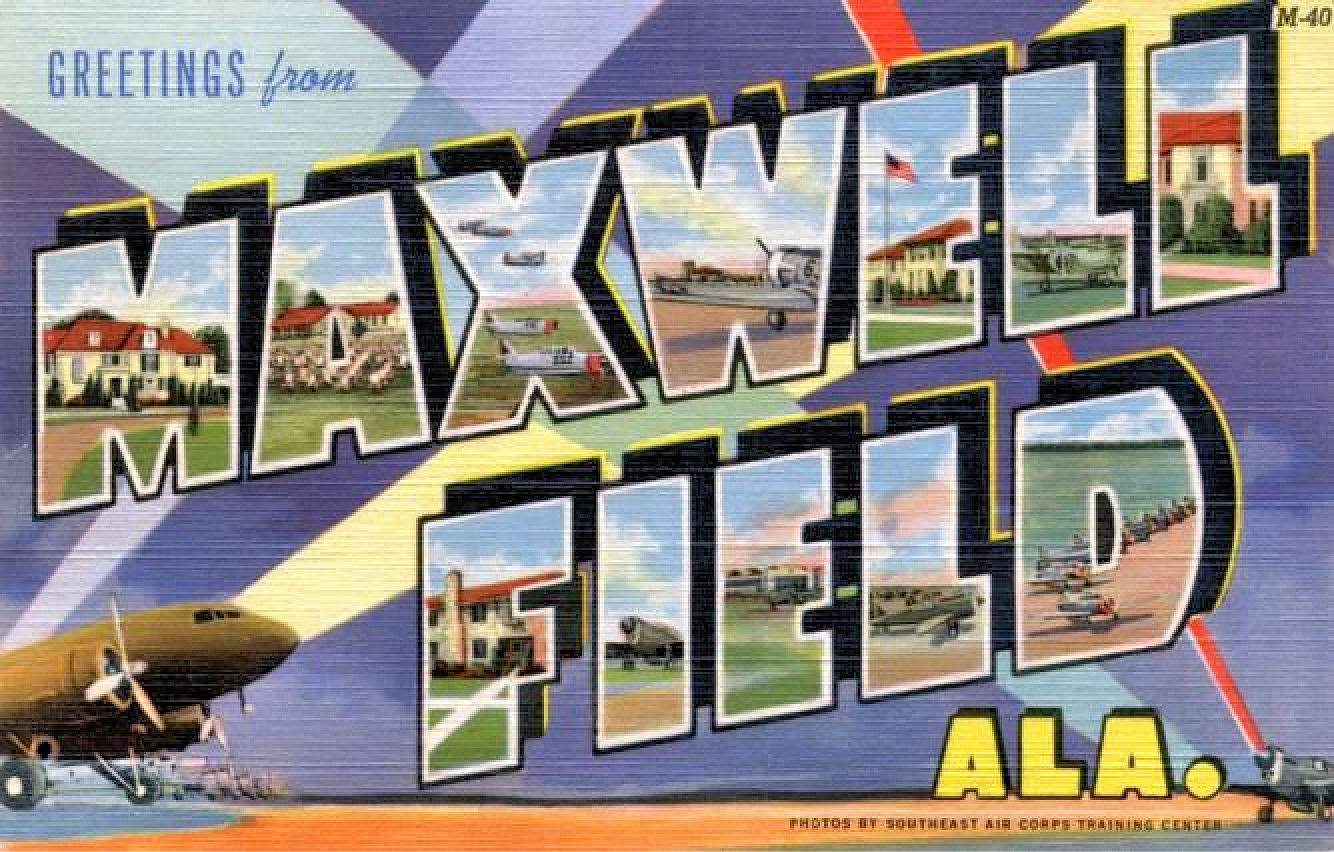
World War II Maxwell Field postcard

In 1940, it was announced that the installation was to be converted into a pilot-training center. On 8 July 1940 the Army Air Corps redesignated its training center at Maxwell Field, Alabama as the Southeast Air Corps Training Center. The Southeast Air Corps Training Center at Maxwell handled flying training (basic, primary and advanced) at airfields in the Eastern United States.

An Air Force Pilot School (preflight) was also activated which instructed Aviation Cadets in the mechanics and physics of flight and required the cadets to pass courses in mathematics and the hard sciences. Then the cadets were taught to apply their knowledge practically by teaching them aeronautics, deflection shooting, and thinking in three dimensions. In June 1941, the Army Air Corps became the U.S. Army Air Forces. On 8 January 1943, the War Department constituted and redesignated the school as the 74th Flying Training Wing handling pre-flight training.

During following years, Maxwell was home to six different schools that trained U.S. military aviators and their support teams for wartime service. As World War II progressed, the number of required pilot trainees declined, and the Army Air Forces decided not to send more aircrew trainees to Maxwell Field. The following known sub-bases and auxiliaries were constructed to support the flying school:

- Passmore Auxiliary Field 32°21′30″N 86°32′00″W
- Troy Auxiliary Field 32°51′44″N 86°00′45″W
- Autaugaville Auxiliary Field 32°25′30″N 86°41′10″W

Maxwell Field 1943 photo pictorial

On 31 July 1943, the Southeast Air Corps Training Center was redesignated as the Eastern Flying Training Command. Also in July, the Army Air Forces announced a specialized school for pilots of four-engine aircraft. The first B-24 Liberator landed at the field later that month and in early 1945, B-29 Superfortress bomber training replaced the B-24 program.

=== Cold War ===
Training at Maxwell continued until 15 December 1945, when the Eastern Flying Training Command was inactivated and was consolidated into the Central Flying Training Command at Randolph Field, Texas.

Air University, an institution providing continuing military education for Army Air Forces personnel, was established at Maxwell in 1946, prior to the U.S. Air Force becoming an independent service the following year. Today, it remains the main focus of base activities at Maxwell.

Maxwell Field was renamed Maxwell Air Force Base in September 1947 when the Air Force was created.

In 1992, the 3800th Air Base Wing (3800 ABW) was disbanded and the 502d Air Base Wing (502 BW) took over as the host wing, which two years later gave way to the current 42d Air Base Wing.

As home of the Air University, Maxwell became the postgraduate academic center of the U.S. Air Force. Air University evolved first as an institution influenced by air power as shaped in World War II, then by the Cold War under the threat of nuclear annihilation, and by air power as applied during the Cold War's Korean and Vietnam conflicts. In the early twenty-first century, the emphasis shifted to air power's role in confronting international and transnational terrorism by both state-sponsored and non-state actors. AU grew materially from inadequate quarters, classrooms, and instructional technology into a campus that is as modern and up-to-date as those of any other in the U. S. armed forces. Construction of Maxwell's Academic Circle, Air University's primary education complex, began in the 1950s. Its centerpiece was the Air University Library, eventually one of several major libraries on a military installation.

Over the years, other activities were established or relocated to Maxwell AFB, to include Headquarters, Civil Air Patrol – USAF; the Air Force Reserve's 908th Tactical Air Support Group (908 TASG), which evolved into the present day 908th Airlift Wing; the Ira C. Eaker Center for Professional Development; the Air Force Financial Systems Operation office (SAF/FM); the Center for Aerospace Doctrine, Research and Education (CADRE); and the Air Force Historical Research Agency, a support organization and repository for air power scholars and AU students. In 1994, Air Force Officer Training School (OTS) was also relocated from Lackland AFB/Medina Annex, Texas to Maxwell AFB, joining the national headquarters of the Air Force's other non-Academy officer accession source, Air Force ROTC.

Detachment 3 of the 58th Operations Group activated at Maxwell during January 2024 to train crews on the MH-139A Grey Wolf.

== Based units ==
Flying and notable non-flying units based at Maxwell Air Force Base:

=== United States Air Force ===
Air Education and Training Command (AETC)

- 42nd Air Base Wing (host wing)
  - 42nd Mission Support Group
    - 42nd Communications Squadron
    - 42nd Contracting Squadron
    - 42nd Force Support Squadron
    - 42nd Logistics Readiness Squadron
    - 42nd Operations Support Flight
    - 42nd Security Forces Squadron
  - 42nd Medical Group
    - 42nd Health Care Squadron
    - 42nd Medical Operations Squadron
- Air University
  - Headquarters Air University
  - Air Force Center for Unconventional Weapons Studies
  - Air Force Culture and Language Center
  - Air Force Cyber College
  - Air Force Judge Advocate General's School
  - Air Force Negotiation Center
  - Air Force Research Institute
  - Carl A. Spaatz Center for Officer Education
    - Air Command and Staff College
    - USAF Air War College
    - International Officer School
    - Squadron Officer School
  - Curtis E. LeMay Center for Doctrine Development and Education
  - Ira C. Eaker Center for Professional Development
    - Air Force Personnel Professional Development School
    - Commanders' Professional Development School
    - Defense Financial Management and Comptroller School
    - US Air Force Chaplain Corps College
  - Jeanne M. Holm Center for Officer Accessions and Citizen Development
    - Air Force Reserve Officer Training Corps
    - Air Force Junior Reserve Officer Training Corps
    - Officer Training School
  - Muir S. Fairchild Research Information Center
  - School of Advanced Air and Space Studies
  - Thomas N. Barnes Center for Enlisted Education
    - Air Force Career Development Academy
    - Air Force Enlisted Heritage Research Institute
    - Air Force Senior Non-commissioned Officer Academy
    - Airman Leadership School
    - Community College of the Air Force
    - Non-commissioned Officer Academy
    - USAF First Sergeant Academy
  - USAF Center for Strategic Deterrence Studies
  - USAF Center for Strategic Leadership Communication
  - USAF Center for Strategy and Technology
- Nineteenth Air Force
  - 58th Special Operations Wing
    - 58th Operations Group
      - Detachment 3 – MH-139A Grey Wolf

Air Combat Command (ACC)

- First Air Force
  - United States Air Force Auxiliary (CAP-USAF)
    - Civil Air Patrol National Headquarters (NHQ-NHQ-001)
      - South East Region (SER)
        - Alabama Wing (ALWG)
          - Maxwell Composite Squadron (AL-032)
      - Civil Air Patrol Overseas Group (NHQ-NHQ-902)
- Sixteenth Air Force
  - 688th Cyberspace Wing
    - 26th Cyberspace Operations Group
      - 26th Network Operations Squadron (GSU)

Air Force Materiel Command (AFMC)

- Air Force Life Cycle Management Center
  - Detachment 5 (GSU)
  - Business & Enterprise Systems Directorate (GSU)
    - Enterprise Logistics Readiness Division
    - Mission Support Systems Division
    - Operations Division
    - Service Management Division
    - Program Execution Group Division
    - Cybersecurity Division
    - Technical Services Division
    - Financial Services Division
    - Contracting Services Division
    - Legal Services Division

Field Operating Agencies

- Air Force Historical Research Agency
- Air Force Logistics Management Agency

Air Force Reserve Command (AFRC)

- Twenty-Second Air Force
  - 908th Flying Training Wing
    - 908th Operations Group
      - 703d Helicopter Squadron – MH-139A Grey Wolf
      - 908th Operations Support Squadron
      - 908th Aeromedical Evacuation Squadron
    - 908th Maintenance Group
      - 908th Aircraft Maintenance Squadron
      - 908th Maintenance Squadron
    - 908th Mission Support Group
      - 25th Aerial Port Squadron
      - 908th Civil Engineering Squadron
      - 908th Force Support Squadron
      - 908th Logistics Readiness Squadron
      - 908th Mission Support Squadron
      - 908th Security Forces Squadron
    - 908th Aeromedical Staging Squadron
- Tenth Air Force
  - 960th Cyberspace Wing
    - 960th Cyberspace Operations Group
      - 689th Network Operations Squadron (GSU)

=== United States Space Force ===
Space Training and Readiness Command (STARCOM)

- Space Delta 13
  - 13th Delta Operations Squadron
    - Detachment 2

=== United States Army ===
Military Entrance Processing Command (USMEPCOM)

- Eastern Sector
  - 8th Battalion
    - Montgomery Military Entrance Processing Station (GSU)

=== Department of Defense ===
Defense Information Systems Agency (DISA)

- Defense Information Systems Agency - Montgomery

=== Environmental Protection Agency ===
- National Laboratories
  - National Analytical Radiation Environmental Laboratory

=== U.S. Department of Justice ===
- Federal Bureau of Prisons
  - Federal Prison Camp, Montgomery

== Education ==
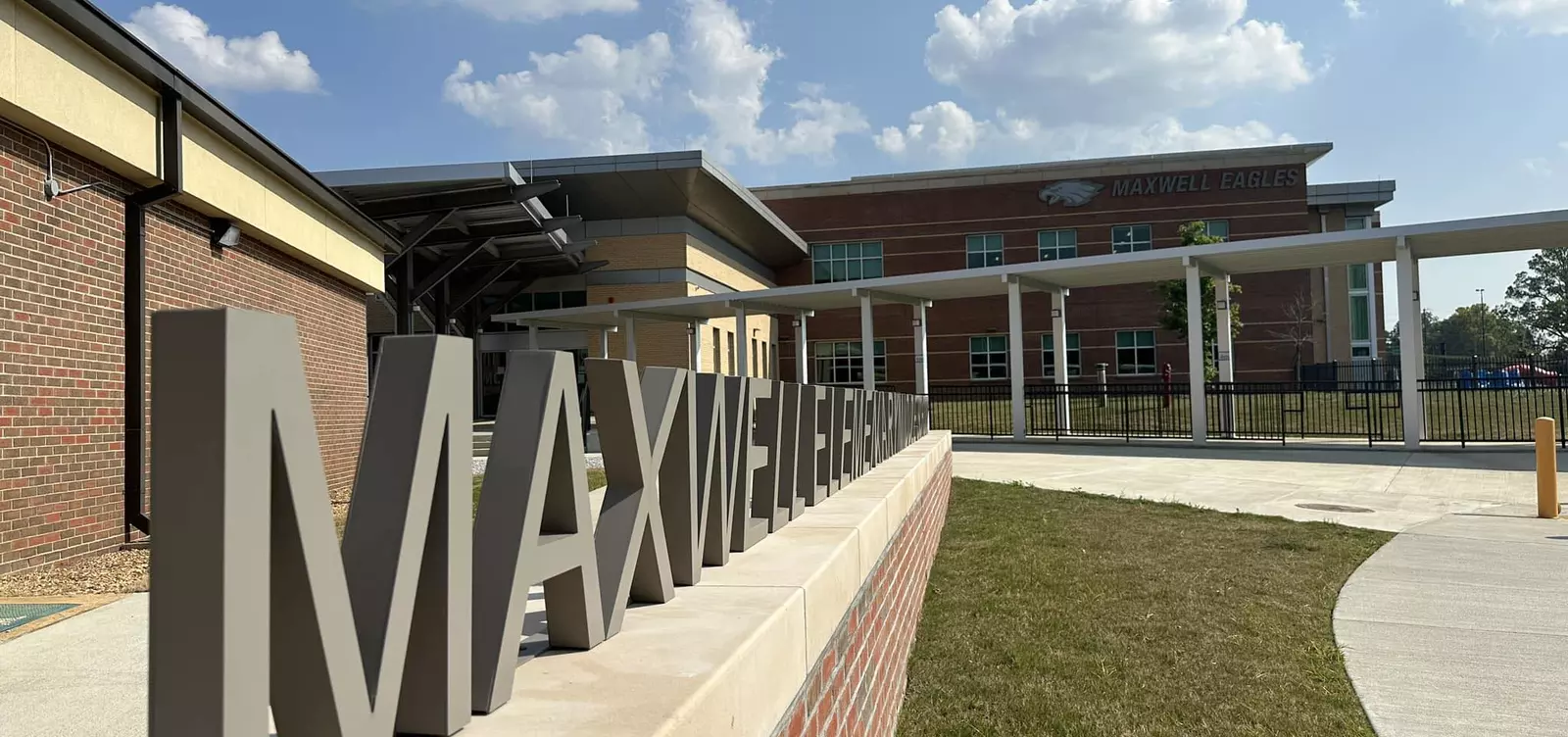
Maxwell Air Force Base Elementary/Middle School

Maxwell Air Force Base is zoned to Department of Defense Education Activity (DoDEA) schools for grades K-8. The DoDEA operates Maxwell Air Force Base Elementary/Middle School. For high school Maxwell AFB residents are zoned to Montgomery Public Schools facilities: residents of the main base are zoned to George Washington Carver High School, while residents of the Gunter Annex are zoned to Dr. Percy L. Julian High School (formerly Robert E. Lee High School). Residents may attend magnet schools. In May 2019, residents of the MaxWell FamCamp, previously only zoned to Montgomery Public Schools, now became allowed to send their children to the DoDEA school zone. There was previously a policy that stated that FamCamp residents were not allowed to use the DoDEA school.

By 2019, the Autauga County Schools and Elmore County Public School System began to allow Maxwell AFB on post families to send their children to their schools. In 2019 Pike Road Schools's board of trustees agreed to allow Maxwell AFB on-post families to send their children to Pike Road High School.

In August 2019, of the children who were dependents of military families attached to Maxwell AFB who were enrolled in public schools, 32.43% attended Montgomery schools, 30.64% attended Autaga schools, 18.03% attended the DoDEA school, 11.31% attended Elmore schools, and 7.59% attended Pike Road schools. In 2020 Trent Edwards, a former military commander, stated that issues in the public school systems in the area around the base threatened the base's existence. Anthony Cotton, a lieutenant general, stated in 2018 that surveying of airmen who went to the war college who chose not to bring their families found that the most common reason why they made this choice was because of the perceived state of area schools. Over 56% of said airmen, around that time, did not have family members living with them.

== Future ==
In November 2020, the Air Force announced that Maxwell AFB is its preferred choice for basing the MH-139A Grey Wolf Formal Training Unit. The Grey Wolf training mission will replace the 908th Airlift Wing's C-130H Hercules mission, with the first of the new aircraft expected to arrive during 2023.

== Popular culture ==
Maxwell AFB appears in the video game Tom Clancy's EndWar as a possible battlefield.

== See also ==
- Air Force Officer Training School
- Air Training Command
- Air and Space Basic Course
- Alabama World War II Army Airfields
- ROTC

== Sources ==
- Manning, Thomas A. (2005), History of Air Education and Training Command, 1942–2002. Office of History and Research, Headquarters, AETC, Randolph AFB, Texas OCLC 71006954, 29991467
- Shaw, Frederick J. (2004), Locating Air Force Base Sites, History's Legacy, Air Force History and Museums Program, United States Air Force, Washington DC. OCLC 57007862, 1050653629
