= Fred Weary =

Fred Weary may refer to:

- Fred Weary (offensive lineman) (born 1977), American football guard
- Fred Weary (defensive back) (born 1974), former American football cornerback
