= Quinshon Judkins =

American football player (born 2003)

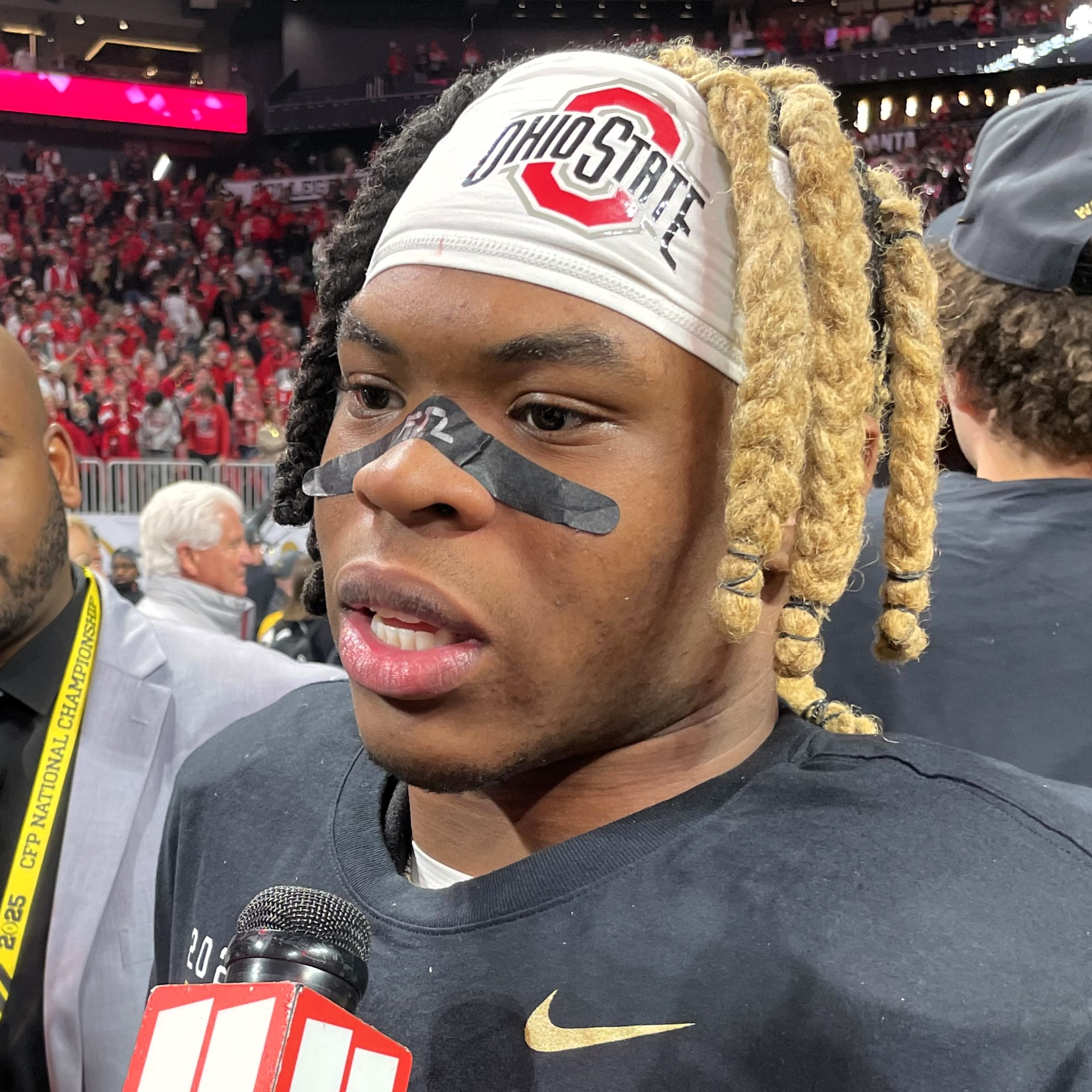
- Judkins with the Ohio State Buckeyes in 2025

No. 10 – Cleveland Browns
- Position: Running back
- Roster status: Active

Personal information
- Born: October 29, 2003 (age 23); Montgomery, Alabama, U.S.
- Listed height: 6 ft 0 in (1.83 m)
- Listed weight: 221 lb (100 kg)

Career information
- High school: Pike Road (Pike Road, Alabama)
- College: Ole Miss (2022–2023); Ohio State (2024)
- NFL draft: 2025: 2nd round, 36th overall pick

Career history
- Cleveland Browns (2025–present)

Awards and highlights
- Freshman All-American (2022); CFP national champion (2024); SEC Freshman of the Year (2022); Conerly Trophy (2022); 2× first-team All-SEC (2022, 2023); Third-team All-Big Ten (2024)

Career NFL statistics as of Week Week 9, 2026, 2025
- Rushing yards: 1,212
- Rushing average: 3.5
- Rushing touchdowns: 10
- Receptions: 48
- Receiving yards: 307
- Receiving touchdowns: 0
- Stats at Pro Football Reference

Quinshon A. Judkins (born October 29, 2003) is an American professional football running back for the Cleveland Browns of the National Football League (NFL). He played college football for the Ole Miss Rebels and Ohio State Buckeyes, winning a national championship with the latter in 2024. Judkins was selected by the Browns in the second round of the 2025 NFL draft.

== Early life ==
Judkins was born on October 29, 2003 in Montgomery, Alabama. He is of Haitian descent, with his dad being from the island and his mom being a second generation Haitian-American-French. Judkins holds both Haitian and French citizenship from his parents. He attended Pike Road High School in Pike Road, Alabama where he was named first-team Class 5A All-State as a junior after rushing for 1,482 yards and 25 touchdowns on 150 carries. Judkins rushed for 1,534 yards and 26 touchdowns as a senior. He was rated a three-star recruit and committed to play college football at Ole Miss over offers from Auburn and Notre Dame.

== College career ==
Judkins entered his freshman season in 2022 as the second-string running back for the Ole Miss Rebels. He was named the Southeastern Conference (SEC) co-Freshman of the Week for Week 4 after rushing for 140 yards and two touchdowns on 27 carries in a 35–27 win over Tulsa. Judkins set school records with 1,567 rushing yards and 16 rushing touchdowns and also caught 15 passes for 132 yards and one touchdown. At the conclusion of his freshman season he was named the SEC Freshman of the Year.

On January 4, 2024, Judkins announced that he would enter the NCAA transfer portal. On January 8, he announced his commitment to Ohio State. He shared the backfield with TreVeyon Henderson. He would go on to win the national championship with Ohio State.

On January 24, 2025, Judkins declared for the 2025 NFL draft.

== Professional career ==
Pre-draft measurables
Height	Weight	Arm length	Hand span	Wingspan	40-yard dash	10-yard split	20-yard split	Vertical jump	Broad jump	Bench press
5 ft 11 5/8 in (1.82 m)	221 lb (100 kg)	30 1/4 in (0.77 m)	9 1/4 in (0.23 m)	6 ft 1 1/2 in (1.87 m)	4.48 s	1.51 s	2.61 s	38.5 in (0.98 m)	11 ft 0 in (3.35 m)	24 reps
All values from NFL Combine/Pro Day

Judkins was selected in the second round with the 36th overall pick in the 2025 NFL draft by the Cleveland Browns. In a Week 3 game against the Green Bay Packers, Judkins scored his first NFL touchdown late in the fourth quarter on a one-yard rush in the 10-13 upset victory. He started all 14 of his appearances for the Browns, recording 230 rushes for 827 yards and seven touchdowns. In Cleveland's Week 16 loss to the Buffalo Bills, Judkins suffered a fractured fibula and dislocated ankle, ending his season.

== Career statistics ==
=== NFL ===
Legend
	Led the league
**Bold**	Career high

==== Regular season ====
Year	Team	Games		Rushing					Receiving					Fumbles	
Year	Team	GP	GS	Att	Yds	Avg	Lng	TD	Rec	Yds	Avg	Lng	TD	Fum	Lost
2025	CLE	14	14	230	827	3.6	46	7	26	171	6.6	58	0	0	0
2026	CLE	8	8	116	385	3.3	30	3	22	136	6.2	16	0	0	0
Career		22	22	346	1,212	3.5	46	10	48	307	6.4	58	0	0	0

=== College ===
Year	Team	Games		Rushing				Receiving			
Year	Team	GP	GS	Att	Yards	Avg	TD	Rec	Yards	Avg	TD
2022	Ole Miss	13	6	**274**	**1,567**	**5.7**	**16**	15	132	**8.8**	1
2023	Ole Miss	13	**13**	271	1,158	4.3	15	**22**	149	6.8	**2**
2024	Ohio State	**16**	8	194	1,060	5.5	14	**22**	**161**	7.3	**2**
Career		42	27	739	3,785	5.1	45	59	442	7.5	5

== Personal life ==
In May 2024, Judkins partnered with the Alabama-based truck dealership Four Star Freightliner Inc., which included a philanthropic pledge tied to his performance. For every touchdown he scored during the season, the company donated $1,000 to the Alabama Kidney Foundation. Following the 2024 season, his 14 touchdowns resulted in a $14,000 contribution to the foundation.

On July 12, 2025, Judkins was arrested in Fort Lauderdale, Florida on charges of domestic assault and battery. On August 14, prosecutors declined to pursue the case, and it was announced that Judkins would not face any formal charges.

Judkins is of partial Nigerian descent.
