= Air Force Data Systems Design Center =

- Active: 1967–1986
- Country: United States
- Branch: United States Air Force
- Role: Computer system design

Insignia
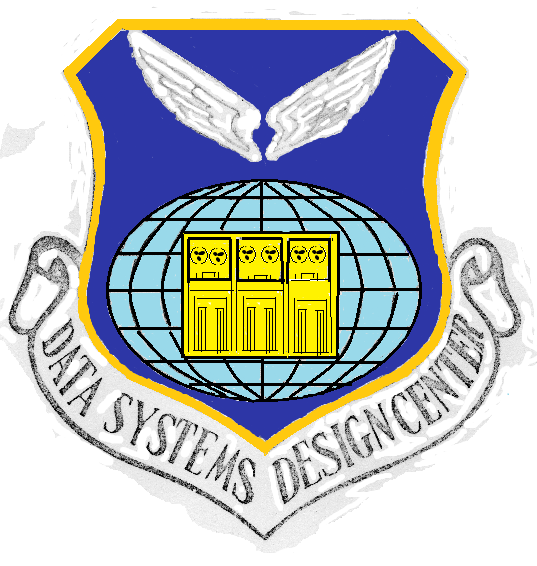
- Air Force Data Systems Design Center emblem

The Air Force Data Systems Design Center was activated on 26 Oct 1967. The unit was located at Bolling Air Force Base in Washington D.C. Its mission was to analyze, design, develop, program, test, implement and maintain all automated data processing systems; incorporate HQ USAF-approved integration and interface requirements in assigned automated data systems; develop and maintain general purpose software required by assigned systems; and develop and recommend standards covering programming languages and documentation requirements for automated data systems. The AFDSDC moved to Gunter Air Force Station, Alabama in 1971, where it was inactivated in November 1986.

== Lineage ==
- Constituted as the Air Force Data Systems Design Center and activated on 26 October 1967

Redesignated Data Systems Design Office on 8 May 1984
Inactivated on 1 November 1986

=== Assignments ===
- United States Air Force, 26 October 1967
- Air Force Data Automation Agency, 1 February 1972
- Air Force Communications Service (later Air Force Communications Command), 1 June 1978
- Air Force Teleprocessing Center, (later Standard Information Systems Center), 8 May 1984 – 1 November 1986

=== Stations ===
- Bolling Air Force Base, 26 October 1967
- Gunter Air Force Station, 1 August 1971 – 1 November 1986
