= Montgomery Public Schools =

School district in Montgomery, Alabama, United States

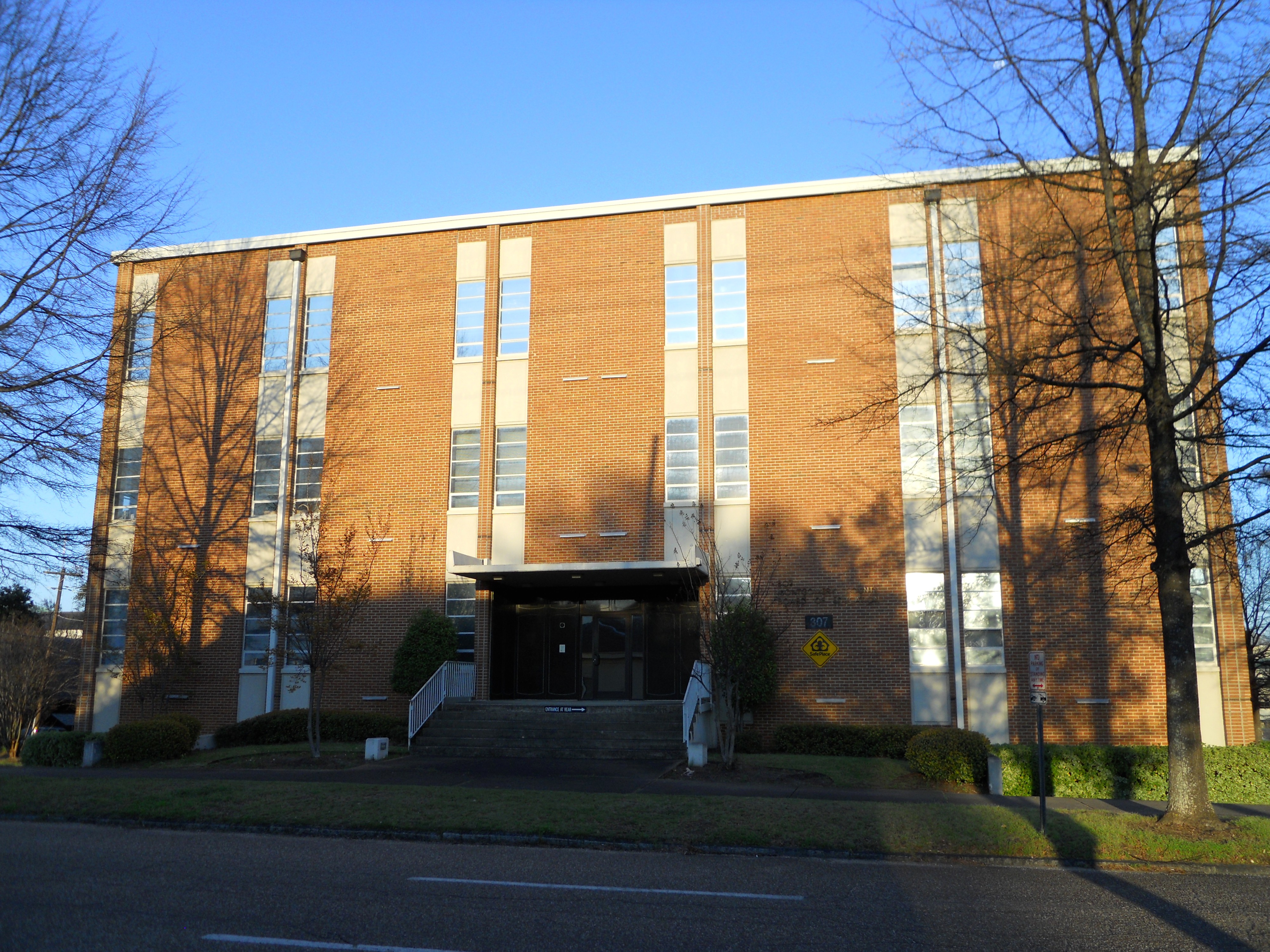
The Montgomery Public Schools headquarters and Montgomery County Board of Education is located at 307 S. Decatur Street in Montgomery.

Montgomery Public Schools is a school district headquartered in Montgomery, Alabama, United States. The current Superintendent of Montgomery Public Schools is Zickeyous Byrd The district serves the city of Montgomery and surrounding Montgomery County. It is the third largest district in Alabama, with 31,743 students enrolled. The entire district is accredited by AdvancED and also has two International Baccalaureate programs: Macmillan International Academy (Elementary) and Johnnie Carr Middle School.

The district serves most of Montgomery County, except for Pike Road (see Pike Road Schools) and, for PreKindergarten-Grade 8, Maxwell Air Force Base. For high school Maxwell AFB residents are zoned to Montgomery Public Schools facilities. In August 2019, of the children who were dependents of military families attached to Maxwell AFB who were enrolled in public schools, 32.43% attended Montgomery schools.

== History ==
In the mid-1910s the county operated forty-seven schools for 3,020 White children. These schools were funded by the county and had only enough desks for about a third of the students. Combined, these schools had a value about half that of the county jail.

In 2010 the district had over 31,000 students. After that year, the student body began to decrease in size. There was an increase of 500 students in 2013, and decreases after that.

In 2014 four Montgomery Public School high schools made it onto the U.S. News & World Report best high schools list, the most of any system in the state, with LAMP High School being named both the best high school in the state and among the top 20 high schools in the nation. Two other MPS schools (BTW Magnet High School and Brewbaker Technology Magnet High School) were named in the top ten best Alabama high schools list, and George Washington Carver High School was also recognized as a top high school on the list.

In 2017 the state took over a number of failing schools in the system. In April 2017, it was reported that the principals of the 27 failing schools were to receive ten-percent salary increases and three-year contract extensions.

On August 18, 2018, one of the three buildings that make up the campus of Booker T. Washington Magnet High School burned down. The 411 students from BTW were moved to the (currently closed) Hayneville Road Elementary School until May 2023 when the school moved into its new campus on Bell Road in August of that same year.

== Schools ==
=== High schools ===
- Brewbaker Technology Magnet High School (2000)
- Carver High School (1948)
- Johnson Abernathy Graetz High School (Est. as Jefferson Davis High School in 1968)
- Dr. Percy L. Julian High School (Est. as Robert E. Lee High School in 1953)
- Loveless Academic Magnet Program High School (Est. out of Sidney Lanier High School in 1984)
- McIntyre Comprehensive Academy
- Park Crossing High School (2014)
- Booker T. Washington Magnet High School (Est. out of Carver High School in 1984)

=== Middle School ===
- Baldwin Arts and Academics Magnet School (1932. Magnet program est. 1989)
- Bellingrath Middle School (1950)
- Brewbaker Intermediate School (1978)
- Capitol Heights Middle School (1929)
- Brewbaker Middle School (1982)
- Carr Middle School (1845)
- Floyd Middle School for Mathematics, Science and Technology (1959. Magnet program est. 1996)
- Goodwyn Middle School (1958)
- McKee Middle School (2002)
- Southlawn Middle School (1997)

=== Elementary schools ===
- Bear Exploration Center School (1956. Magnet program est. 1996)
- Blount Elementary School (2008)
- Brewbaker Intermediate School/Brewbaker Primary School (1978)
- Carver Elementary and Arts Magnet School (1989)
- Catoma Elementary School (1922)
- Chisholm Elementary School (1921)
- Crump Elementary School (1967)
- Dalraida Elementary School (1954)
- Dannelly Elementary School (1962)
- Davis Elementary School (1957)
- Dozier Elementary School (1974)
- Fitzpatrick Elementary School (1989)
- Flowers Elementary School (1960)
- Forest Avenue Academic Magnet School (1923. Magnet program est. 1989)
- Garrett Elementary School (1997)
- Halcyon Elementary School (2002)
- Highland Avenue Elementary School (1903)
- Highland Gardens Elementary School (1955)
- Johnson Elementary School (1961)
- MacMillan International Academy for Humanities, Communications & Technology (Est. 1903 as West End School. Magnet program est. 1995)
- Martin Luther King Elementary School (1997)
- Morningview Elementary School (1950)
- Morris Elementary School (1997)
- Nixon Elementary School (2001)
- Pintlala Elementary School (1922) Pintlala
- Southlawn Elementary School (1968)
- Vaughn Road Elementary School (1974)
- Wares Ferry Elementary School (1978)
- Wilson Elementary School (2008)

== Former schools ==
- Chilton Elementary School (c. 1891) Closed 1976
- Georgia Washington Junior High School (c. 1895) Bought by Pike Road and converted into Pike Road High School in 2018
- Decatur Street School (1901) Later known as LedBetter Elementary. Closed c. 1964
- Bellinger Hill Elementary School (1904) Closed c. 1977
- Sidney Lanier High School (1910) Closed 2024
- Capitol Heights Elementary School (1917) Burned down c. 1976
- Cloverdale Junior High School (1922) Closed 2002
- Loveless Junior High School (1923) Converted into LAMP in 1999
- Daisy Lawrence Elementary School (1938) Later turned into an alternative elementary. Closed 2011
- Booker T. Washington School (1948) Closed 1970. Later converted into Booker T Washington Magnet School
- William R. Harrison Elementary School (1954) Closed 2011
- W.B. Paterson Elementary School (1954) Closed 2009
- Peterson Elementary School (1955) Former elementary school for residents of Maxwell Air Force Base. Closed 2006
- Houston Hill Junior High School (1962) Closed 2011. Used to house LAMP High School.
- Hayneville Road Elementary School (1963) Closed 2011. Used to house BTW Magnet School
- Thomas L. Head Elementary School (1964) Closed 2011.
- McIntyre Middle School (1968) Closed 2011. Used to house McIntyre Comprehensive Academy

== See also ==
- Education in Alabama
