= Mose Tolliver =

American painter

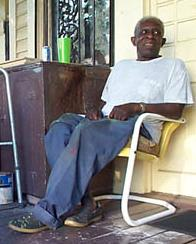
- Mose Tolliver at his home in Alabama, 2002
- Born: July 4, 1918/1920; Pike Road, Alabama, U.S.
- Died: October 30, 2006 (aged 86–88); Montgomery, Alabama, U.S.
- Education: Self-taught

Moses Ernest Tolliver (July 4, 1918/1920 – October 30, 2006) was an American artist. He was known as "Mose T", after the signature on his paintings, signed with a backwards "s."

== Biography ==
Tolliver was born one of 12 children to sharecroppers Ike and Laney Tolliver in the Pike Road community, near Montgomery, Alabama. His exact year of birth is unknown, though it is known he was born on the Fourth of July as well as between the years 1920–25. He attended school only until the third grade due to a self-described lack of interest in education. In the 1930s, the family moved to Montgomery, Alabama where he helped support his parents and their large family by doing odd jobs.

In the early 1940s he married his childhood friend, Willie Mae Thomas, and had 13 children, 11 of whom survived to adulthood. During the late 1960s, while working at McLendon's furniture factory, he had a severe injury where his legs were crushed when a half-ton load of marble shifted and fell from a forklift as he was sweeping in the furniture factory. After this incident, he turned to painting to combat boredom, pain and long hours of idle time. Although many say that his career started after the accident, Tolliver claims he painted beforehand. He would often turn his paintings upside-down and paint the picture of perhaps an animal and landscape positioned from various directions. Tolliver's titles are wildly divergent; e.g., "Smoke Charlies," "Scopper Bugs," or "Jick Jack Suzy Satisfying her own Self".

On October 30, 2006, Tolliver died from pneumonia in Montgomery, Alabama.

== Career ==
After the incident at McLendon's, Tolliver saw paintings by McLendon's brother, Raymond, and he decided that he could do that too. The Mclendons offered to buy him lessons and teach him but he declined, wanting to create his own style. This is where Tolliver began to sign his work, "Mose T" with a backward "s." Tolliver's paintings would usually portray some sort of nature, animal, or even self-portraits of himself. He regularly worked with "pure house paint" on plywood, and things like door frames, or table tops, creating whimsical and sometimes erotic pictures of animals, humans, and flora. His familiar themes also included watermelons and birds. Tolliver's painting style is referred to as flat, full frontal, or straight profile with a muted palette. He crafted hanging devices for his work, and many of his later paintings feature a metal soda can ring for display purposes. A "Quail Bird" may glide over a cotton field, or a spread-leg "Diana" or "Moose Lady" may be straddled over an exercise bicycle rack. Never able to walk well following his injury, he painted many self portraits with crutches or would sit on his bed and balance whatever surface he was painting on, on his knees. Tolliver's themes were drawn from his own experience.

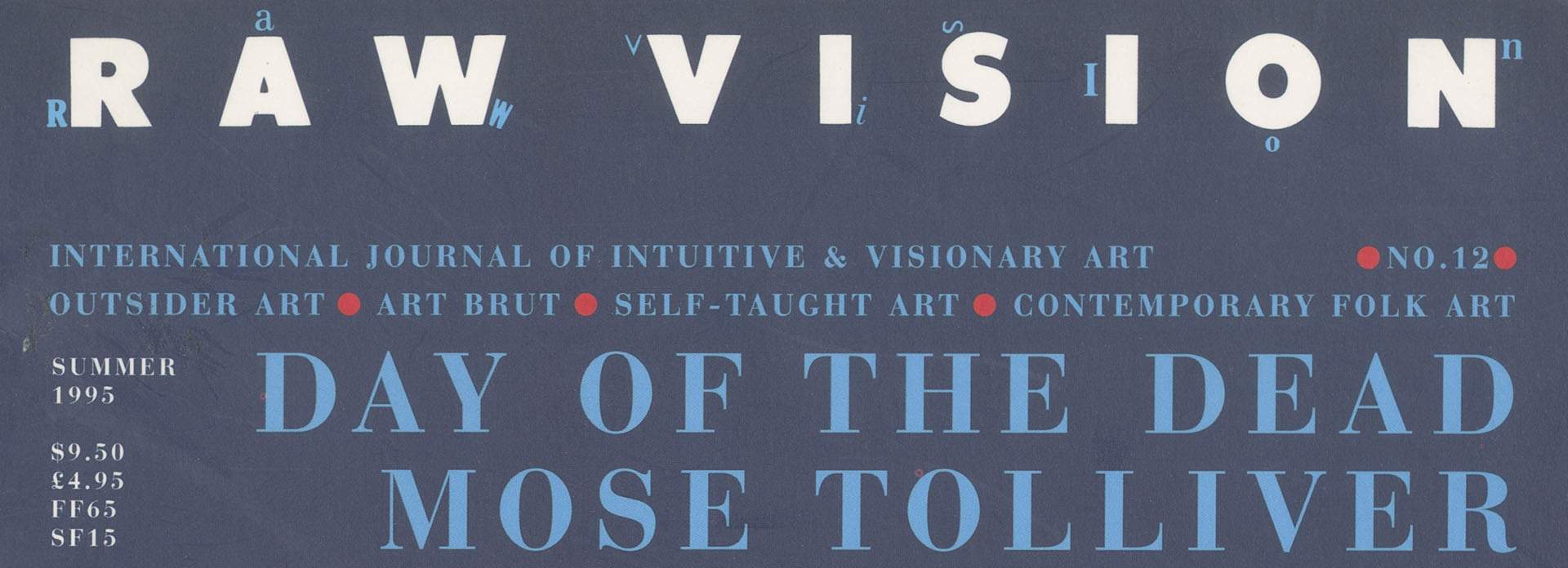
Raw Vision journal, detail.

Tolliver's work has been exhibited in the Smithsonian American Art Museum in Washington, DC, and at the Philadelphia College of Art, Montgomery Museum of Fine Arts, Pérez Art Museum Miami, and the Corcoran Gallery of Art. Relatives of Tolliver have imitated his style and signed their work as he did, making it sometimes difficult for collectors to find an original painting. His daughter Annie was also an artist.

== Collections and exhibition ==
Mose Tolliver is part of numerous permanent art collections including

- National Gallery of Art, Washington, D.C.
- Metropolitan Museum of Art, New York
- Smithsonian American Art Museum
- Centre Pompidou, Paris
- Museum of Contemporary Art, Los Angeles
- High Museum of Art, Atlanta
- de Young Museum, San Francisco
- Pérez Art Museum Miami
- Birmingham Museum of Art
- Akron Art Museum
- University of Michigan Museum of Art
- Minneapolis Institute of Art

Many institutions have exhibited Mose Tolliver works including:

- National Gallery of Art, Washington, D.C.
- Metropolitan Museum of Art, New York, NY
- Deyoung Museum, San Francisco, CA
- Smithsonian American Art Museum, DC
- Pérez Art Museum Miami, FL
- Retrospective, American Folk Art Museum, New York, NY
- Passionate Visions of the American South, New Orleans, LA

== See also ==
- Clementine Hunter
