= 13th Delta Operations Squadron =

U.S. Space Force unit

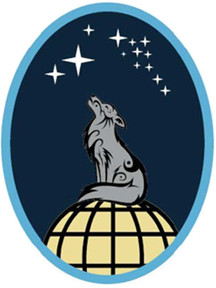
- 13 DOS emblem
- Active: 16 September 2021–present
- Country: United States
- Branch: United States Space Force
- Type: Squadron
- Role: Operations support
- Part of: Space Delta 13
- Headquarters: Maxwell Air Force Base, Alabama, U.S.

The 13th Delta Operations Squadron (13 DOS) is a United States Space Force unit. Assigned to Space Training and Readiness Command's Space Delta 13, it is responsible for providing operations support to the delta. It was activated on 16 September 2021 and is temporarily headquartered at Maxwell Air Force Base, Alabama.

== List of commanders ==
- Lt Col Joan Thompson, 16 September 2021

== See also ==
- Space Delta 13
