= Eric Motley =

American government official (born 1972)

Eric L Motley
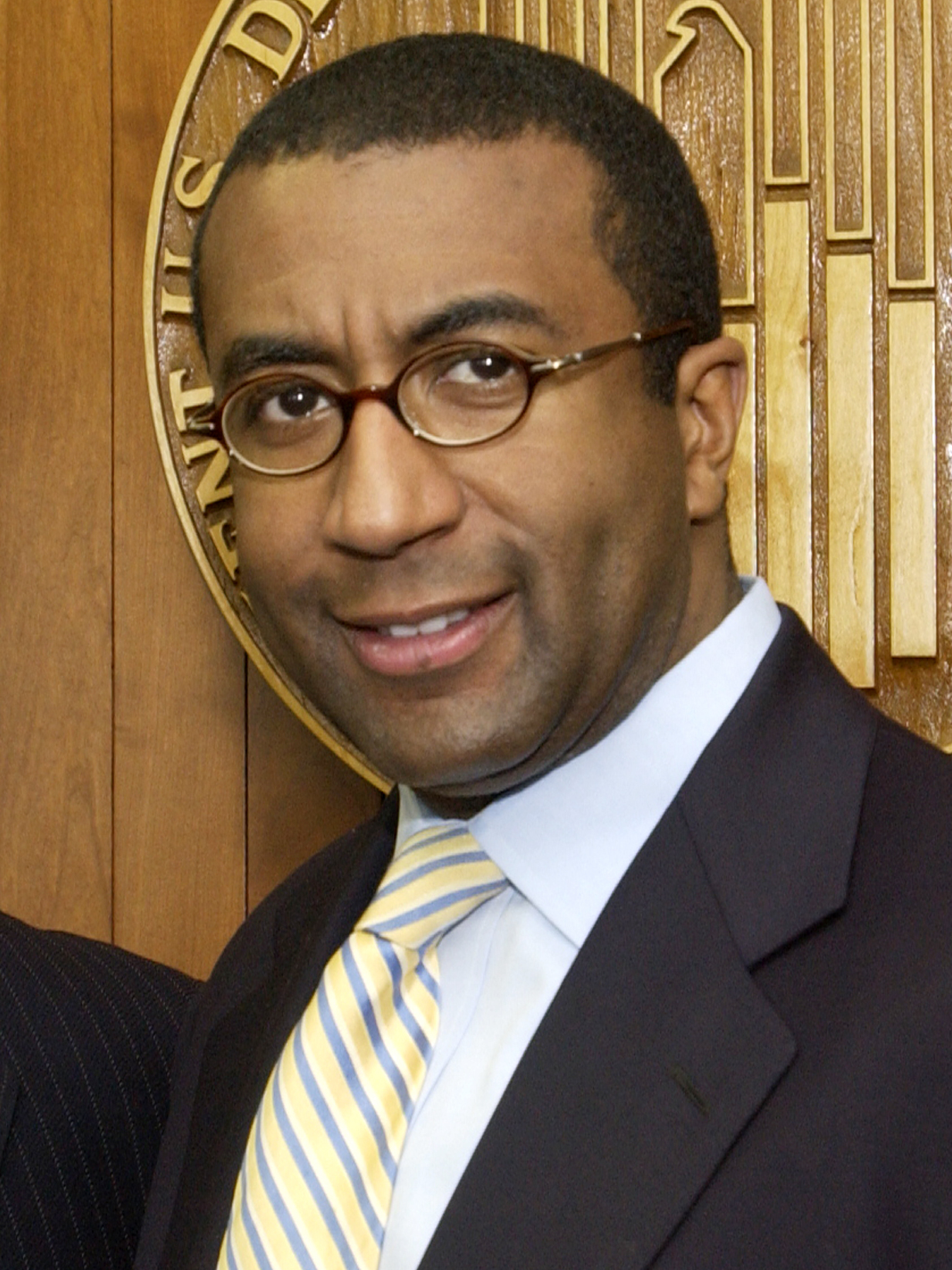
- Motley in 2007
- Born: Eric Lamar Motley; Montgomery, Alabama
- Citizenship: United States
- Education: Robert E. Lee High School, Samford University (1996)
- Alma mater: Ph.D, Political Philosophy/International Rel., 1996–2000, University of St. Andrews
- Occupation: Nonprofit Executive
- Employer: National Gallery of Art

Eric Lamar Motley (born 1972) is the Deputy Director of the National Gallery of Art, located in Washington, D.C.

== Early life and education ==
Eric was born near Montgomery, Alabama, United States and grew up in the Madison Park community (Montgomery, AL).

Motley earned his bachelor's degree in Political Science and Philosophy from Samford University in 1996, where he graduated Omicron Delta Kappa. There he served as president of the Student Government Association. As a Rotary International Ambassadorial Scholar at the University of St Andrews, he earned a Master of Letters in International Relations and a Ph.D. in International Relations as the John Steven Watson Scholar.

== Career ==
Since August 2021 he has served as Deputy Director of the National Gallery of Art. From 2007 to 2021 he worked at the Aspen Institute, most recently as Executive Vice President and Corporate Secretary. He formerly served as Executive Director of National Programs, Vice President and Managing Director of the Henry Crown Fellows Program as well as the Executive Director of the Aspen-Rockefeller Foundation's Commission to Reform the Federal Appointments Process.

Prior to joining the Aspen Institute, he served as director of the Office of International Visitors in the Bureau of Educational and Cultural Affairs at the U.S. State Department. The office had a 100-person staff and a budget that exceeded $80 million. Prior to that, he had served as a Special Assistant to President George W. Bush for Presidential Personnel, where he managed the appointment process in the White House for over 1,200 presidentially-appointed advisory board and commission positions. He joined the White House staff as Deputy Associate Director, Office of Presidential Personnel in 2001 at the age of 27 immediately after receiving his Ph.D. from the University of St Andrews in Scotland. He was the youngest appointee by the George W. Bush Administration.

Motley sits on numerous national and Washington, DC boards. He is involved in the arts and humanities and is a book collector. In June 2006, his life story was featured in The Washington Post as part of the series "Being a Black Man in America."

== Bibliography ==
- Madison Park: A Place of Hope (2017, Zondervan, ISBN 978-0310349631)
