= Secdrick McIntyre =

American football player (born 1954)

No. 41
- Position: Running back

Personal information
- Born: June 2, 1954 (age 72); Montgomery, Alabama, U.S.
- Listed height: 5 ft 10 in (1.78 m)
- Listed weight: 190 lb (86 kg)

Career information
- High school: Lee (Montgomery)
- College: Auburn
- NFL draft: 1977: undrafted

Career history
- Atlanta Falcons (1977)

Career NFL statistics
- Rushing yards: 65
- Rushing average: 5
- Receptions: 1
- Receiving yards: 27
- Touchdowns: 1
- Stats at Pro Football Reference

Secdrick McIntyre (born June 2, 1954) is an American former professional football player who was a running back for the Atlanta Falcons of the National Football League (NFL) in 1977. He played college football for the Auburn Tigers.
