= Dr. Percy L. Julian High School =

Location
- 225 Ann Street; Montgomery, Alabama 36107; United States; 32.378°N 86.271°W

Information
- Former name: Robert E. Lee High School
- School type: Public high school
- Motto: Together we build, together we build
- Established: 1955 (71 years ago)
- School district: Montgomery Public Schools
- CEEB code: 011900
- Teaching staff: 74.50 (FTE)
- Grades: 9-12
- Enrollment: 1,282 (2024-2025)
- Student to teacher ratio: 17.21
- Colors: Navy and orange
- Mascot: Phoenix
- Communities served: Gunter Annex
- Website: www.mps.k12.al.us/o/pjhs

Dr. Percy L. Julian High School (formerly Robert E. Lee High School) is a public high school in Montgomery, Alabama, United States, serving grades 9–12. The school is part of the Montgomery Public Schools system.

Dr. Percy L. Julian High School is zoned for the northside of Montgomery, including residents of the Gunter Annex of the Maxwell Air Force Base.

== History ==
=== Early history ===
In January 1953, the Montgomery Board of Education purchased 12 acres (49,000 m^{2}) of property on Ann Street for $74,000 for a new high school. The new school would alleviate overcrowding at Sidney Lanier High School and accommodate children coming to Montgomery due to Maxwell and Gunter Air Force Bases. The final cost of the new facility was nearly $1.25 million.

The school opened to students for the first time on September 6, 1955, under the name Robert E. Lee High School. The new school had 35 faculty members and approximately 800 students. Most of the 232 juniors and 173 seniors entering the school were transfers from Lanier, and some 354 sophomores moved up from area junior high schools. Its first graduating class consisted of 144 students.

=== Expansion ===
An auditorium was added in 1963. The guidance office, lunchroom, and library were enlarged and the math wing and mini-gym were added during the 1970s. By 1979 rooms were air conditioned, after students and teachers raised the necessary $80,000. In 1992, the library underwent extensive renovation and the entire school received a new roof. In 1997, land behind Julian formerly occupied by apartments was donated to the school, and in 2000 the space was completely paved to provide parking. In the summer of 2002, the entire school system was networked and wired with fiber optic cable to provide better and faster internet and network capabilities. Fine arts at the school have grown. The fine arts program includes drama which perform plays in the Auditorium, Art, Debate, and Choral .

The school added 9th Grade in the 2010/2011 school year. Julian High School's motto is The pursuit of continuous excellence.

=== Confederate legacy ===
The school included a plaque dedicated to its former namesake, Robert E. Lee, instructing students to not defame him.

=== Renaming ===
In 2020 the school district's board of education voted to change the school's name from Robert E. Lee High School.

In November 2022, it was announced that the school would be renamed Dr. Percy L. Julian High School after Percy Lavon Julian.

== Sports ==
The Phoenix represent the school in ASHAA sporting competitions. During the 2005–2006 and 2007–2008 school years the Generals Cheerleaders won the Cheersport National Championship. In August 2023, the school mascot was changed to a phoenix.

=== State championships ===
- Boys Basketball: 2020
- Baseball: 1975
- Boys' Cross Country: 1967
- Football: 1958, 1959, 1960, 1969, 1970, 1979, 1986, 1991, 1992
- Boys' golf: 1962, 1963, 1964, 1966, 1974
- Boys' indoor track: 1968, 1969, 1970, 1971, 1974, 1978, 1979, 1980, 2017
- Boys' outdoor track: 1961, 1968, 1970, 1971, 1978, 1979, 1980
- Girls' outdoor track: 1981
- Wrestling: 1957, 1978, 1980, 1984, 1992

== Notable alumni ==
- Brian Bass, Minnesota Twins baseball player
- Fred Beasley, former Auburn University football player and NFL player
- Terry Beasley, football player
- Stephen "tWitch" Boss, dancer and actor
- Antoine Caldwell, former University of Alabama football player and NFL player (Houston Texans)
- Clint Compton, former MLB player (Chicago Cubs)
- Lee Gross, former NFL player
- David Langhorst, politician and businessperson in Idaho
- Secdrick McIntyre, former NFL player
- Duke Miles, basketball player
- Eric Motley, public administrator
- Martha Myers, physician, member of Alabama Women's Hall of Fame
- Michael O'Neill, actor
- Wiley Peck, basketball player
- Quentin Riggins, American player of gridiron football and member of Auburn University Board of Trustees
- Tyrone Rogers, former Alabama State football player and NFL player
- Henry Ruggs III, former University of Alabama football player and former NFL player
- Tommy Shaw, from Styx and Damn Yankees
- Trevis Smith, former University of Alabama football player and CFL player
- Daniel Thomas, NFL player
- Mike Washington, former NFL player
- Fred Weary, former University of Tennessee football player and NFL player
- Sam Williams, former University of Mississippi football player and current NFL player
