= Aubrey Hornsby =

American army officer and aviator

- Born: January 8, 1895; Eclectic, Alabama, U.S.
- Died: May 31, 1981 (aged 86); Montgomery, Alabama
- Education: Air Corps Tactical School
- Military career
- Allegiance: United States
- Branch: United States Air Force

Aubrey Thomas Hornsby I (January 8, 1895 – May 23, 1981) was a U.S. Army officer and pioneer aviator who reached the rank of Brigadier General. He began his Army career during World War I as an artillery observer, seeing service in France and Germany, then continued to serve as an aviator and administrator through World War II, after which he was elected to the Alabama House of Representatives.

== Biography ==
He was born in 1895 in Eclectic, Alabama, to Judson Anne Nichols (1869–1953) and Jackson Lee Hornsby (1868–1954). His father was a merchant. Hornsby graduated from Elmore County High School in 1915, then attended the University of Alabama and Southern University for two years until he volunteered in the Army as a private in May 1917.

Less than six months after his enlistment, he had earned his commission and was appointed Second Lieutenant in November 1917, in the Field Artillery Reserve. In May 1918, he transferred to the American Expeditionary Force as an Aerial Observer serving in France, England, and Germany for one year. He returned to the United States in 1918, married Nancy (Nannie) Mae Thomas of Alabama on August 15, 1918, and they had three children: Aubrey Thomas Hornsby II (1922–1983) who was born in Virginia; William Lee Hornsby (1926–2005); and Jack Hornsby (1927–1978). William and Jack were both born in Alabama. Aubrey was then stationed at Mitchel Field, on Long Island until July 1920. Along with his transfer to Kelly Field in Texas, he was promoted to First Lieutenant.

In 1921 Hornsby graduated from both the Air Service Pilots' School and the Air Service Bombardment School. He participated in the 1922 experimental bombing of surrendered German battleships as a contemporary of Billy Mitchell, and he won the second place award in the 1926 Liberty Engine Builders' Trophy race. This was an air-race held among fifteen top military pilots at the Sesquicentennial International Exposition in Philadelphia to celebrate the nation's 150th birthday. In 1930 the family was living in Riverside, California. As a captain he commanded Clark Field in the Philippines.

Gunter Field in Alabama was built in 1940 under his leadership and he was the first base commander. This was an important training center built prior to, but in expectation of, US involvement in World War II. Originally it was known as Army Air Corps Basic Flying School, later as Gunter Field, and now as part of Maxwell Air Force Base. Hornsby assumed that position on August 27, 1940, and was replaced 28 months later by Colonel Raymond L. Winn on December 28, 1942, one year after Pearl Harbor. It was at Gunter Field that the assembly line system of maintaining planes, whose time-saving efficiency had attracted wide attention, was pioneered, based on Hornsby's experience in aircraft maintenance.

As a Brigadier General, Hornsby commanded the 308th Bombardment Wing of the United States Air Force for part of 1946, while it was stationed in Korea as part of the occupation force and involved in weather research. In 1946 he was awarded Army Distinguished Service Medal "for exceptionally meritorious and distinguished services to the Government of the United States, in a duty of great responsibility."

Aubrey Hornsby died in 1981 in Montgomery, Alabama.

== Postings ==
- 1917-18: American Expeditionary Force (Europe)
- 1918-20: Mitchel Field, Long Island in New York
- 1920-22: Kelly Field, Texas
- 1922-24: Langley Field, Virginia
- 1924-27: Maxwell Field, Alabama
- 1927-30: March Field, California
- 1930-32: Clark Field, Philippine Islands
- 1932-33: Maxwell Field, Alabama
- 1933-37: Bolling Field, District of Columbia
- 1937-40: Maxwell Field, Alabama
- 1940-42: Gunter Field, Montgomery, Alabama
- 1946-46: 308th Bomber Group - Korea (various)
