= Space Delta 13 =

U.S. Space Force education unit

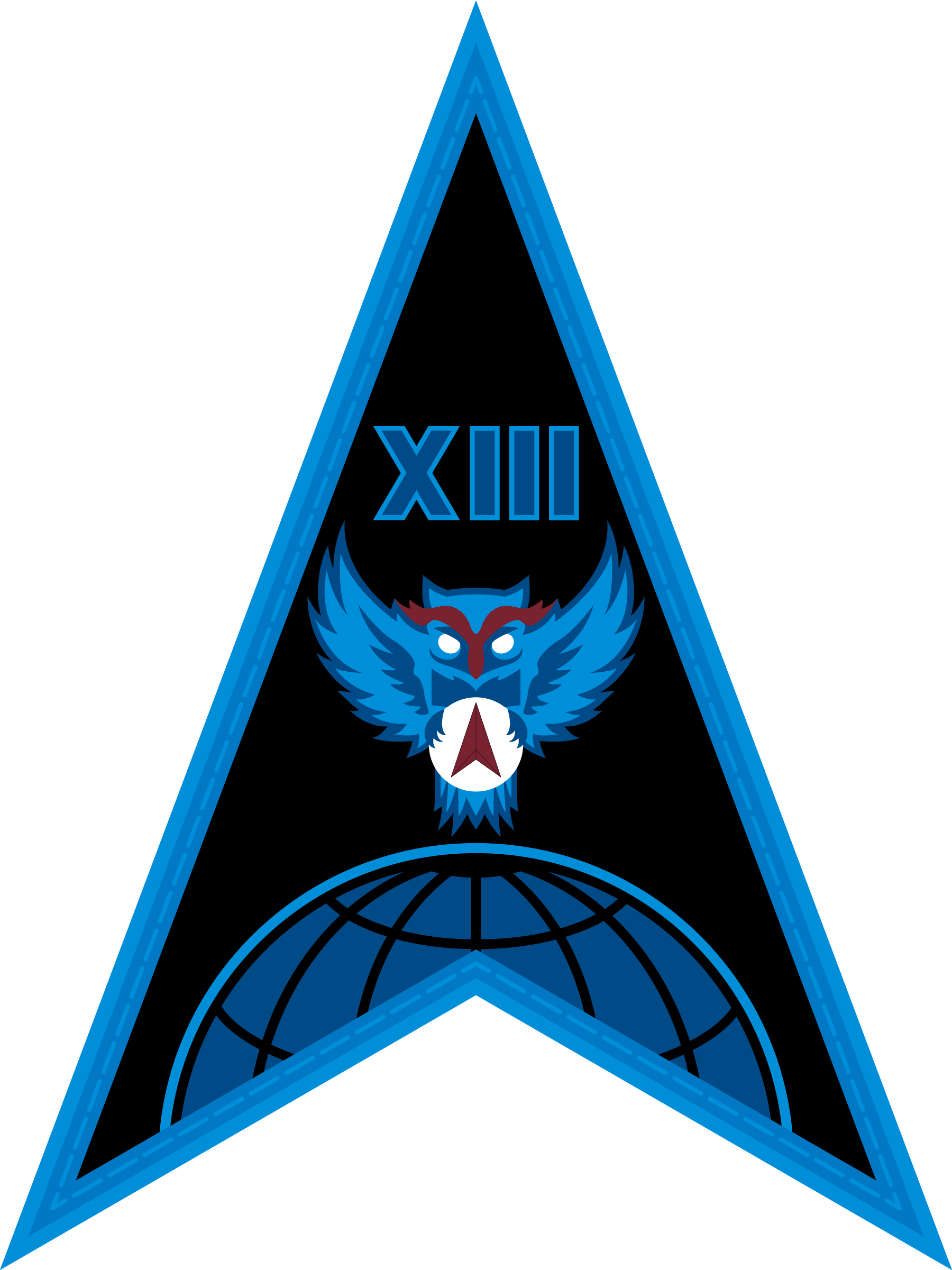
- Delta emblem
- Active: 1984–1991; 2021–present
- Country: United States
- Branch: United States Space Force
- Type: Delta
- Role: Space education
- Part of: Space Training and Readiness Command
- Headquarters: Joint Base Andrews, Maryland
- Website: Official website

Commanders
- Director: Dr. Thomas J. Griffy
- Senior Enlisted Leader: Chief Master Sergeant Stephen Van Mil
- Director of Staff: Mrs. Sara Powell

Insignia
- Guidon

Space Delta 13 (DEL 13) is a United States Space Force unit responsible for space education. It offers advanced and developmental space education courses for the Space Force and its joint and allied partners. It was established on 23 August 2021 following the establishment of the Space Training and Readiness Command, the field command to which it reports. It is headquartered at Joint Base Andrews, Maryland.

== History ==
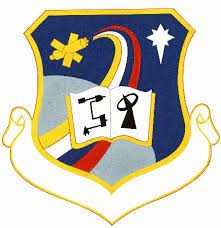
3430th Technical Training Group emblem

DEL 13's lineage can be traced back to 1 October 1984 when the Air Training Command activated the 3430th Technical Training Group (3430 TCHTG) under the 3400th Technical Training Wing at Lowry Air Force Base, Colorado, responsible for all training related the space operations mission in support of the Air Force Space Command. It initially composed of the 3423d Technical Training Squadron (3423 TCHTS) with operating locations in Sunnyvale Air Force Station and Johnson Space Center. That year, it had 67 instructors, teaching 33 courses and trained 973 officers and enlisted personnel. In 1987, it gained a second squadron, the 3454th Technical Training Squadron (3454 TCHTS). The 3423 TCHTG was inactivated on 1 September 1991.

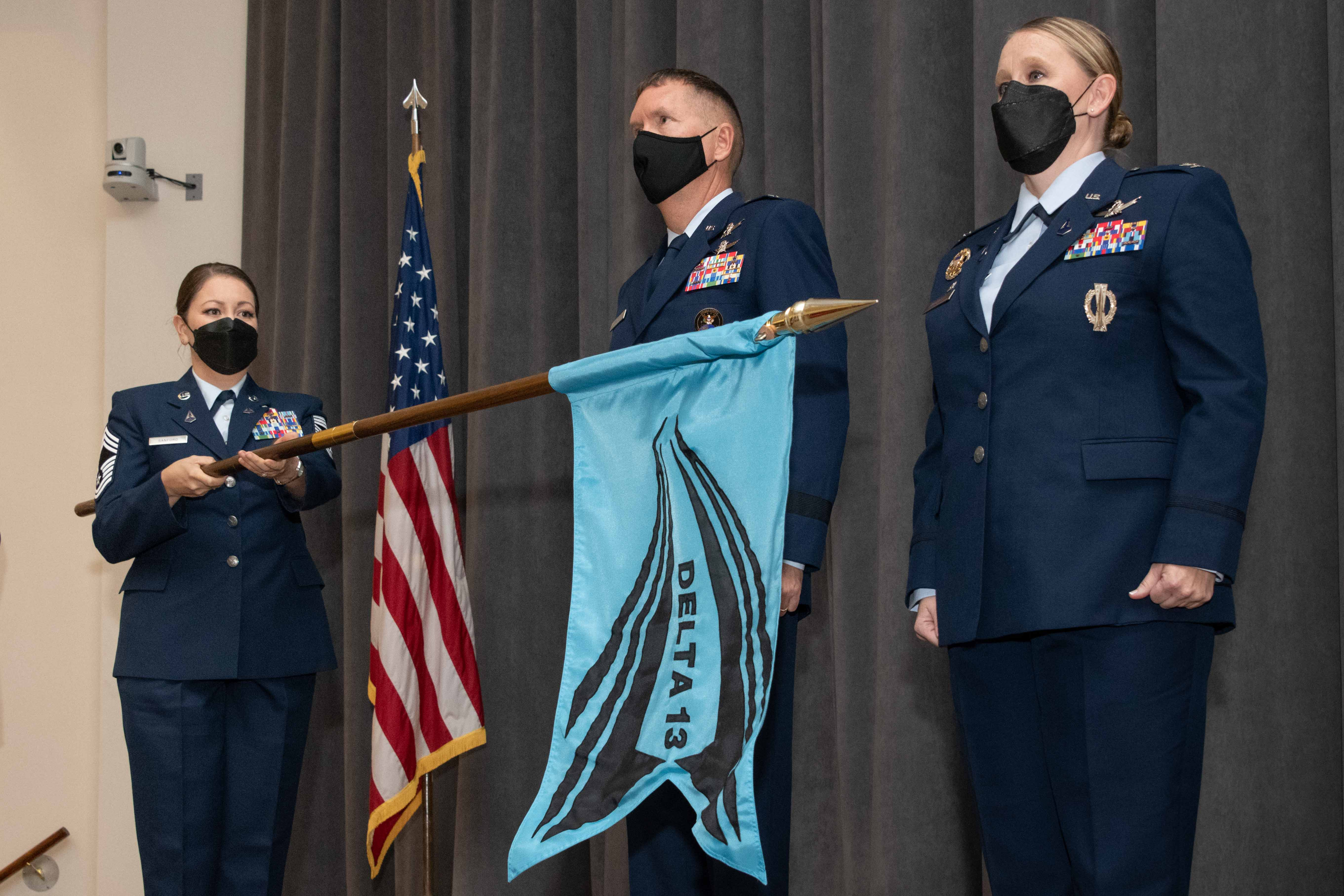
Space Delta 13 activation, 2021

Prior to the activation of Space Training and Readiness Command (STARCOM), the 3423 TCHTG was redesignated as Space Delta 13 (DEL 13) on 19 August 2021. During the activation of STARCOM on 23 August 2021, DEL 13 was one of the five deltas activated as part of the new field command. A ceremony was held on 13 September 2021 at Maxwell Air Force Base, Alabama, to signify the activation of DEL 13. It was formed by consolidating various space education units such as the National Security Space Institute (NSSI) and the Forrest L. Vosler Non-Commissioned Officer Academy (Vosler NCO Academy) and two detachments that serve as liaisons to the United States Air Force Academy and Air University. Additionally, the 13th Delta Operations Squadron was activated on 15 September 2021 to provide operational support to DEL 13.

DEL 13 is temporarily based at Maxwell while a permanent location will be determined through the strategic basing process.

Instead of standing up its own war college like other services, the Space Force in 2023 partnered with the Johns Hopkins University School of Advanced International Studies for its intermediate and senior professional military education.

== Structure ==
DEL 13 is one of five deltas that reports to the Space Training and Readiness Command. It is composed of the following six subordinate units, three squadrons and three detachments:

Unit		Function	Headquarters
S Q U A D R O N S	13th Delta Operations Squadron	Delta staff and squadron management	Maxwell Air Force Base, Alabama
S Q U A D R O N S	National Security Space Institute	Military space education	Peterson Space Force Base, Colorado
S Q U A D R O N S	Forrest L. Vosler Noncommissioned Officer Academy	Enlisted professional military education	Peterson Space Force Base, Colorado
D E T S
D E T S	Detachment 1	Space Force liaison to U.S. Air Force Academy	United States Air Force Academy, Colorado
D E T S	Detachment 2	Space Force liaison to Air University	Maxwell Air Force Base, Alabama
D E T S	Detachment 3	Schriever & West Space Scholars Program (ILE & SLE)	Washington D.C.

== List of commanders ==
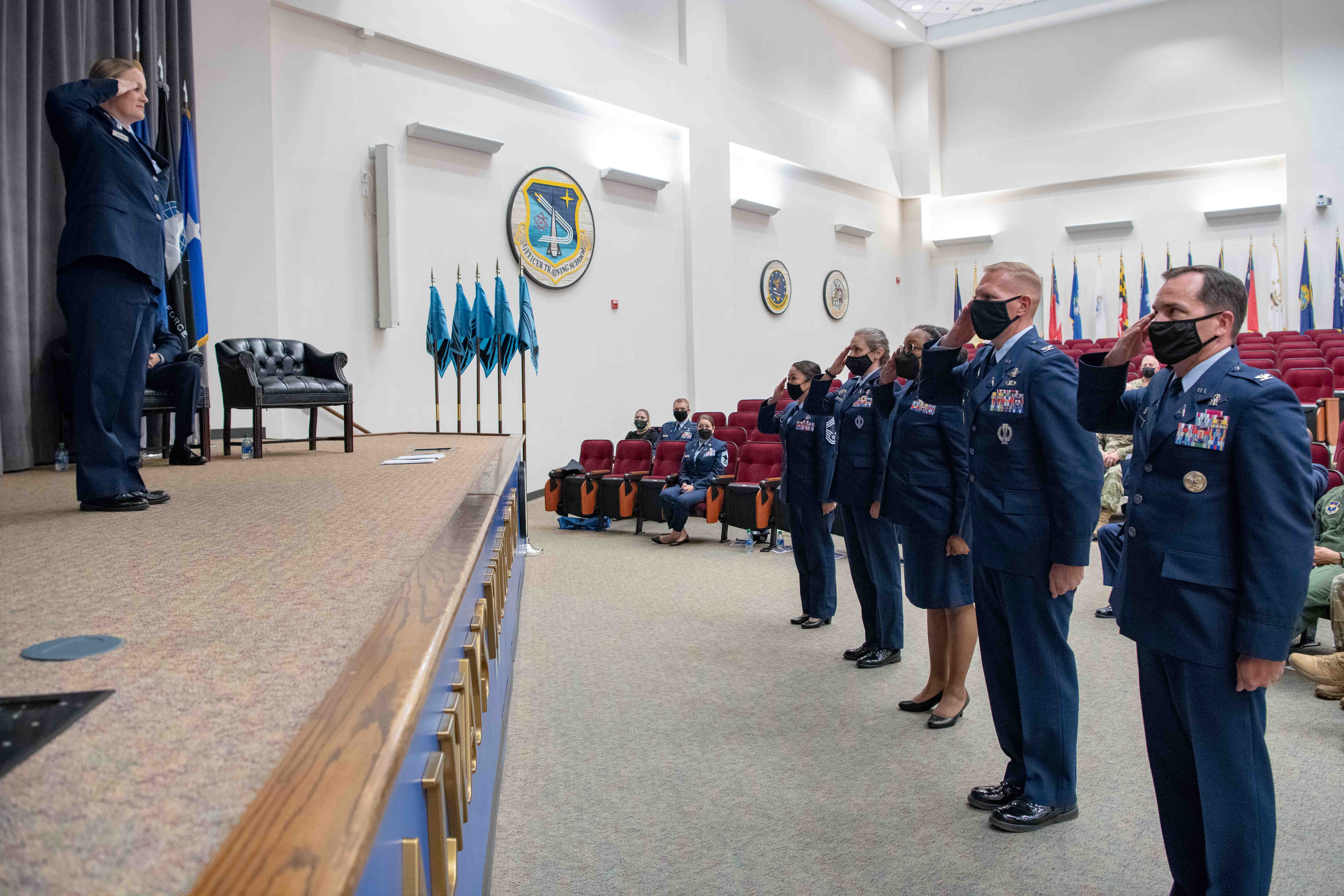
Col Lindhorst (left), inaugural commander of DEL 13, salutes commanders of the delta's subordinate units during the activation ceremony, 2021

No.	Commander		Term			Ref
No.	Portrait	Name	Took office	Left office	Term length	Ref
1	Niki J. Lindhorst	Colonel; Niki J. Lindhorst	23 August 2021	5 August 2023	1 year, 347 days	
2	Bryan J. Dutcher	Colonel; Bryan J. Dutcher	5 August 2023	1 July 2025	1 year, 330 days	
3	Alison R. Gonzalez	Colonel; Alison R. Gonzalez	1 July 2025	16 September 2026	1 year, 77 days	
-	Thomas J. Griffy	Thomas J. Griffy; Acting	16 September 2026	Incumbent	61 days	
