= Forrest L. Vosler Non-Commissioned Officer Academy =

U.S. Space Force unit

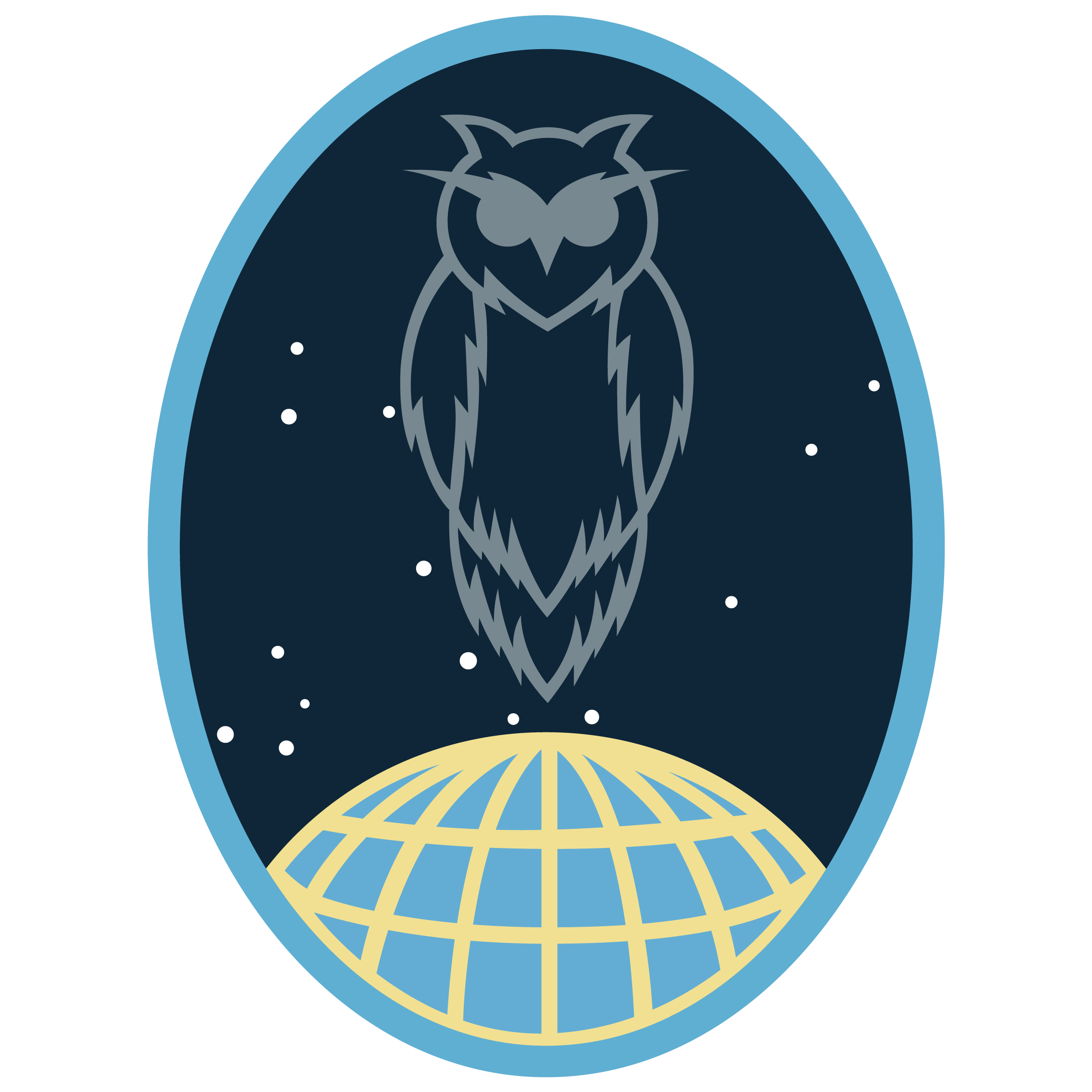
- Academy emblem
- Active: 1994–present
- Country: United States
- Branch: United States Space Force
- Type: Squadron
- Role: Enlisted professional military education
- Part of: Space Delta 13
- Headquarters: Peterson Space Force Base, Colorado, U.S.
- Website: www.peterson.af.mil/ncoa/index.asp

Commanders
- Commandant: CMSgt Michael List
- Vice Commandant: SMSgt Brianna Fields

Insignia
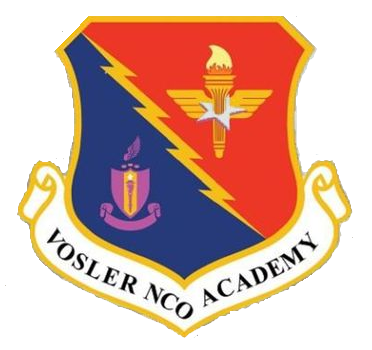
- Former Forrest L. Vosler Non-Commissioned Officer Academy emblem

The Forrest L. Vosler Non-Commissioned Officer Academy (Vosler NCO Academy, Vosler NCOA, or NCOA) is a United States Space Force unit. Assigned to Space Training and Readiness Command's Space Delta 13, it is responsible for training newly promoted technical sergeants. It is named after Forrest L. Vosler who was an enlisted airman and a Medal of Honor awardee. It was transferred from the United States Air Force to the Space Force on 21 September 2020 and is headquartered at Peterson Space Force Base, Colorado.

== List of commandants ==
- CMSgt Thomas Young, ~2007
- CMSgt Gregory Stone, ~2011
- CMSgt Todd Krulick, 27 October 2014
- CMSgt Robert Woodin, 18 February 2016
- CMSgt Krist Steck, June 2019
- CMSgt April L. Brittain, April 2022
- CMSgt Michael List, 18 June 2024
- CMSgt Samantha Ward, 12 June 2026

== See also ==
- Space Delta 13
