= Pike Road, Alabama =

- Town
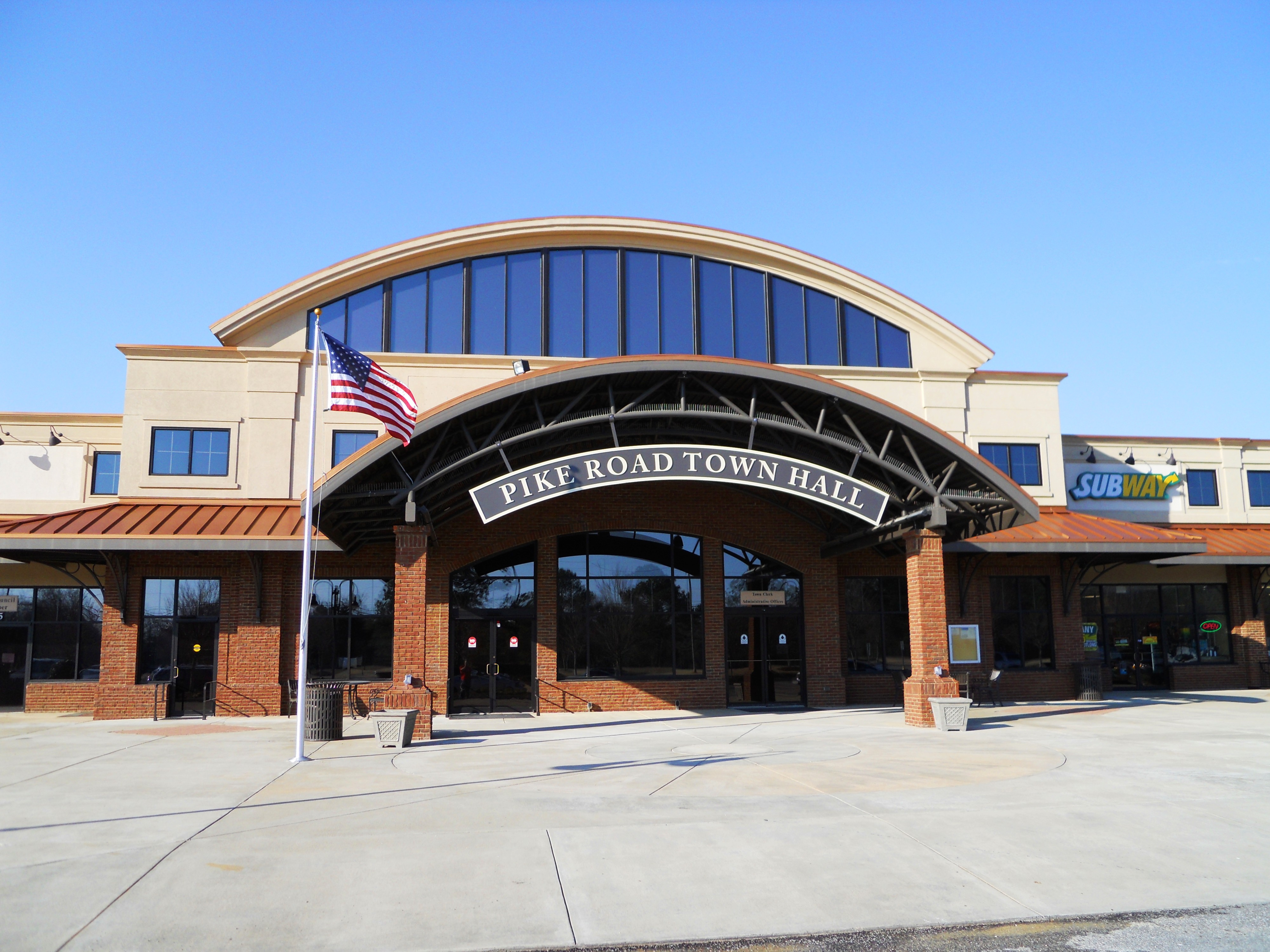
- Pike Road Town Hall

- Location of Pike Road, Alabama
- Coordinates: 32.273609°N 86.118927°W
- Country: United States
- State: Alabama
- County: Montgomery
- Founded: 1815
- Incorporated: 1997

Government
  - Mayor: Gordon Stone
  - Mayor Pro Tempore: Rob Steindorff
  - Town Council: Angie Bradsher; Chris Dunn; Doug Fuhrman; Chris Myers

Area
  - Town: 34.319 sq mi (88.886 km^{2})
  - Land: 34.019 sq mi (88.108 km^{2})
  - Water: 0.300 sq mi (0.776 km^{2}) 0.87%
- Elevation: 300 ft (90 m)

Population (2020)
  - Town: 9,439
  - Estimate (2024): 11,500
  - Density: 338.0/sq mi (130.49/km^{2})
  - Metro: 387,885 (US: 145th)
- Time zone: UTC–6 (Central (CST))
  - Summer (DST): UTC–5 (CDT)
- ZIP Code: 36064
- Area code: 334
- FIPS code: 01-59760
- GNIS feature ID: 0155197
- Sales tax: 8.75%
- Website: pikeroad.us

Pike Road is a town in Montgomery County, Alabama, United States. The population was 9,439 at the 2020 census, and was estimated to be 11,500 in 2024. It is part of the Montgomery metropolitan area.

== History ==
Pike Road was founded in 1815. Pike Road was incorporated in 1997.

== Geography ==
Pike Road is located in east-central Montgomery County at 32.273609, -86.118927. It is bordered to the north by the city of Montgomery, the state capital. U.S. Routes 82 and 231 pass through the town together as Troy Highway, which leads northwest 12 miles (19 km) to the center of Montgomery. The two highways diverge southeast of Pike Road, with US 82 leading east-southeast 33 miles (53 km) to Union Springs and US 231 leading south 35 miles (56 km) to Troy.

According to the United States Census Bureau, the town has a total area of 34.319 square miles (88.89 km^{2}), of which 34.019 square miles (88.11 km^{2}) is land and 0.300 square miles (0.78 km^{2}) (0.87%) is water.

== Government ==
Pike Road elects a mayor and a five-member town council every four years. The mayor and all council members are elected at-large. Pike Road's current mayor is Gordon Stone.

The current town council members are: Chris Dunn, Angie Bradsher, Chris Myers, Doug Fuhrman and Rob Steindorff. The Pike Road Town Council meets at 6:00 p.m. on the second Monday of each month as well as the fourth Wednesday of every month at 7:00 a.m. Meetings are held in the council chamber at Pike Road Town Hall (9575 Vaughn Road).

The Town of Pike Road, Alabama employs ten full-time staff members, several part-time staff members and utilizes contractors to fulfill other staff and project needs.

Sales tax is 8.75 percent, of which 4.00 percent goes to the State of Alabama, 2.50 percent goes to the County of Montgomery, and 2.25 percent goes to the Town of Pike Road. Income tax goes to the United States Government.

The United States Postal Service operates the Pike Road Post Office in the town limits.

== Demographics ==
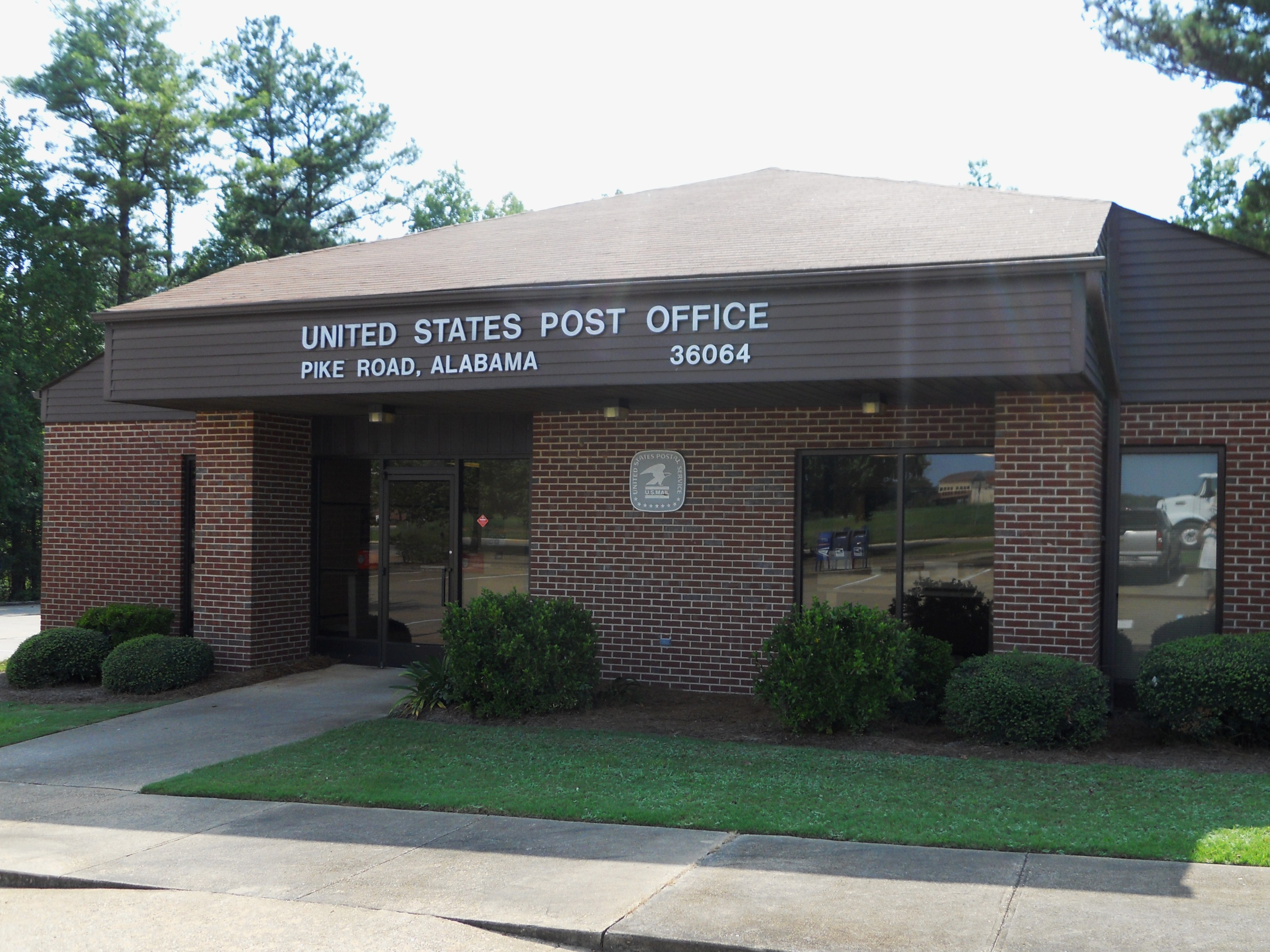
Pike Road Post Office

Historical population
Census	Pop.	Note	%±
2000	310		—
2010	5,406		1,643.9%
2020	9,439		74.6%
2025 (est.)	11,899	▲	26.1%
U.S. Decennial Census; 2020 Census

=== Racial and ethnic composition ===
Pike Road, Alabama – racial and ethnic composition Note: the US Census treats Hispanic/Latino as an ethnic category. This table excludes Latinos from the racial categories and assigns them to a separate category. Hispanics/Latinos may be of any race.
Race / ethnicity (NH = non-Hispanic)	Pop. 2000	Pop. 2010	Pop. 2020	% 2000	% 2010	% 2020
White alone (NH)	183	3,672	5,385	59.03%	67.92%	57.05%
Black or African American alone (NH)	125	1,542	2,970	40.32%	28.52%	31.47%
Native American or Alaska Native alone (NH)	0	7	13	0.00%	0.13%	0.14%
Asian alone (NH)	1	76	548	0.32%	1.41%	5.81%
Pacific Islander alone (NH)	0	1	3	0.00%	0.02%	0.03%
Other race alone (NH)	0	0	36	0.00%	0.00%	0.38%
Mixed race or multiracial (NH)	1	39	252	0.32%	0.72%	2.67%
Hispanic or Latino (any race)	0	69	232	0.00%	1.28%	2.46%
Total	310	5,406	9,439	100.00%	100.00%	100.00%

=== 2020 census ===
As of the 2020 census, Pike Road had a population of 9,439. The median age was 38.1 years. 27.9% of residents were under the age of 18 and 13.0% of residents were 65 years of age or older. For every 100 females there were 94.5 males, and for every 100 females age 18 and over there were 91.6 males age 18 and over.

25.7% of residents lived in urban areas, while 74.3% lived in rural areas.

There were 3,271 households and 2,719 families residing in the town. Of all households, 45.3% had children under the age of 18 living in them. 68.1% were married-couple households, 10.0% were households with a male householder and no spouse or partner present, and 19.0% were households with a female householder and no spouse or partner present. About 14.6% of all households were made up of individuals, and 5.0% had someone living alone who was 65 years of age or older.

There were 3,415 housing units, of which 4.2% were vacant. The homeowner vacancy rate was 1.5% and the rental vacancy rate was 7.3%. The population density was 283.9 inhabitants per square mile (109.6/km^{2}). Housing density averaged 102.7 per square mile (39.7/km^{2}).

=== Demographic estimates ===
As of the 2023 American Community Survey, there are 3,491 estimated households in Pike Road with an average of 2.89 persons per household. The town has a median household income of $121,687. Approximately 4.8% of the town's population lives at or below the poverty line. Pike Road has an estimated 70.6% employment rate, with 59.0% of the population holding a bachelor's degree or higher and 97.1% holding a high school diploma.

The top five reported ancestries (people were allowed to report up to two ancestries, thus the figures will generally add to more than 100%) were English (91.6%), Spanish (1.3%), Indo-European (1.1%), Asian and Pacific Islander (6.0%), and Other (0.0%).

The median age in the town was 36.1 years.

=== 2010 census ===
As of the 2010 census, there were 5,406 people, 1,933 households, and 1,606 families residing in the town. The population density was 170.8 inhabitants per square mile (65.9/km^{2}). There were 2,064 housing units at an average density of 65.23 per square mile (25.2/km^{2}). The racial makeup of the town was 68.48% White, 28.69% African American, 0.13% Native American, 1.41% Asian, 0.04% Pacific Islander, 0.50% from some other races and 0.76% from two or more races. Hispanic or Latino people of any race were 1.28% of the population.

The town's population grew almost 20-fold since the 2000 census, making it one of the fastest growing incorporated places in Alabama with a population of over 5,000 in 2010.

=== 2000 census ===
As of the 2000 census, there were 310 people, 110 households, and 95 families residing in the town. The population density was 83.7 inhabitants per square mile (32.3/km^{2}). There were 114 housing units at an average density of 30.8 per square mile (11.9/km^{2}). The racial makeup of the town was 59.03% White, 40.32% African American, 0.00% Native American, 0.32% Asian, 0.00% Pacific Islander, 0.00% from some other races and 0.32% from two or more races. Hispanic or Latino people of any race were 0.00% of the population.

There are 110 households out of which 37.3% have children under the age of 18 living with them, 68.2% are married couples living together, 12.7% have a female householder with no husband present, and 13.6% are non-families. 12.7% of all households are made up of individuals and 2.7% have someone living alone who is 65 years of age or older. The average household size is 2.82 and the average family size is 3.07.

The age distribution was 25.8% under the age of 18, 8.7% from 18 to 24, 24.8% from 25 to 44, 33.5% from 45 to 64, and 7.1% who are 65 years of age or older. The median age is 40 years. For every 100 females there are 96.2 males. For every 100 females age 18 and over, there are 101.8 males.

The median income for a household in the town is $86,492, and the median income for a family is $105,116. Males have a median income of $88,307 versus $17,321 for females. The per capita income for the town is $36,912. 19.8% of the population and 13.7% of families are below the poverty line. Out of the total people living in poverty, 38.6% are under the age of 18 and 0.0% are 65 or older.

The population has since grown as communities that were unincorporated joined Pike Road.

== Education ==
=== Primary and secondary schools ===
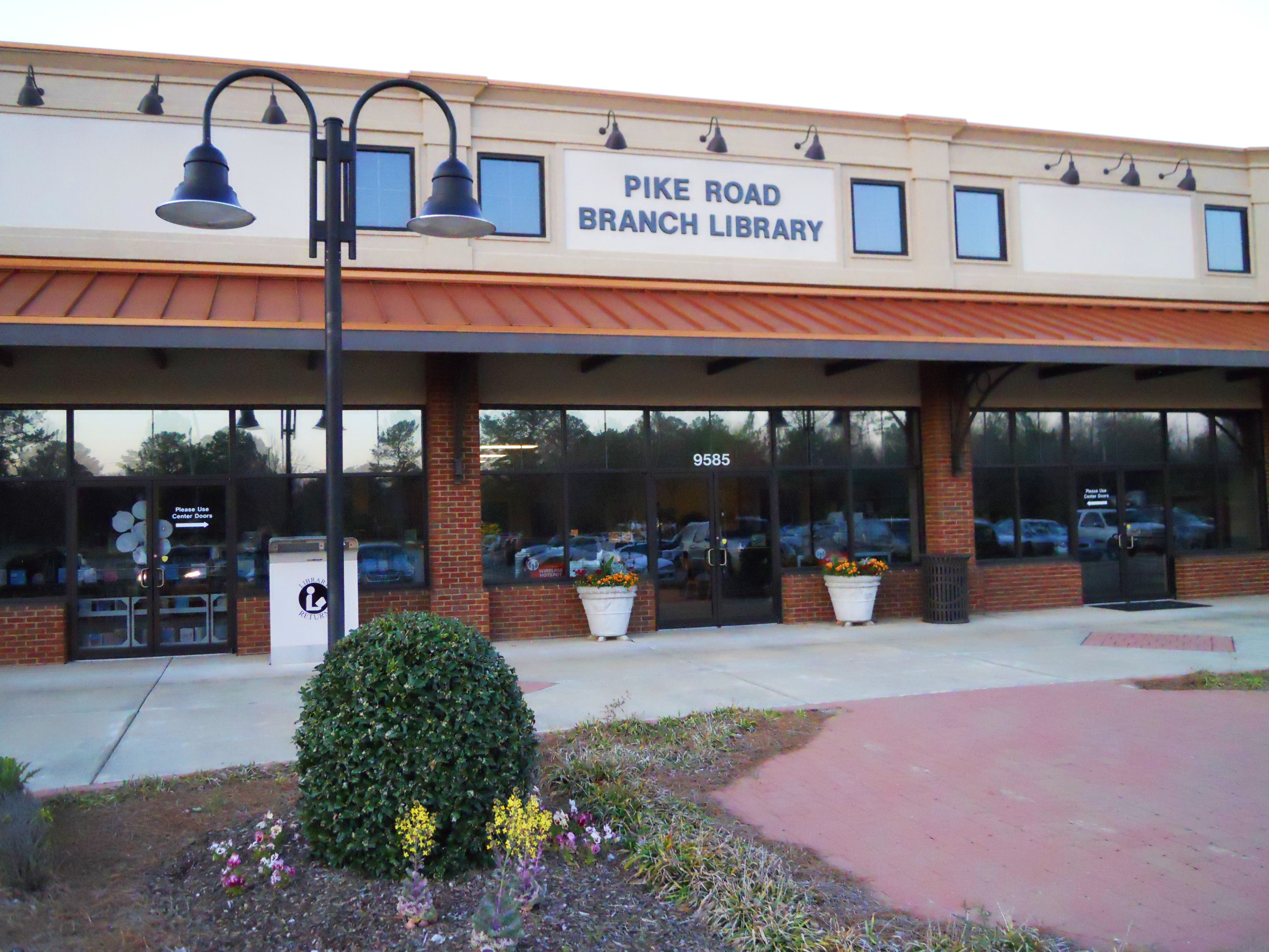
The Pike Road Branch Library is located adjacent to the Pike Road Town Hall at 9585 Vaughn Rd.

In 1918, the residents of Pike Road acquired funds to establish the Pike Road Consolidated School, which opened in 1919. The school closed in 1970.

On Wednesday, December 22, 2010, Pike Road established a municipal school system, Pike Road Schools. On Thursday, August 13, 2015, the Pike Road Board of Education opened the doors to its first school as part of its own independent school district. This first school, Pike Road School, served kindergarten to 8th-grade students. Overcrowding in the schools was an issue from the onset, as the population growth of the Town outpaced the school board's ability to acquire new school buildings or build their own schools. The district's second school, The Pike Road Historic School was renovated and opened in 2017. Pike Road's third school, Pike Road High School, was established at the Georgia Washington Middle School Campus (acquired from Montgomery Public Schools) in 2018. The high school has a full varsity athletics program which is a member of the Alabama High School Athletics Association.

=== Public libraries ===
The Pike Road Public Library of the Montgomery City-County Public Library is located in Pike Road. It is located in the Pike Road Station shopping center near the intersection of Pike and Vaughn Roads.

== Notable people ==
- Mose Tolliver, folk artist
- Tarvaris Jackson, NFL quarterback
- Quinshon Judkins, running back for the Cleveland Browns
