= Pike Road Schools =

School district in Alabama, United States

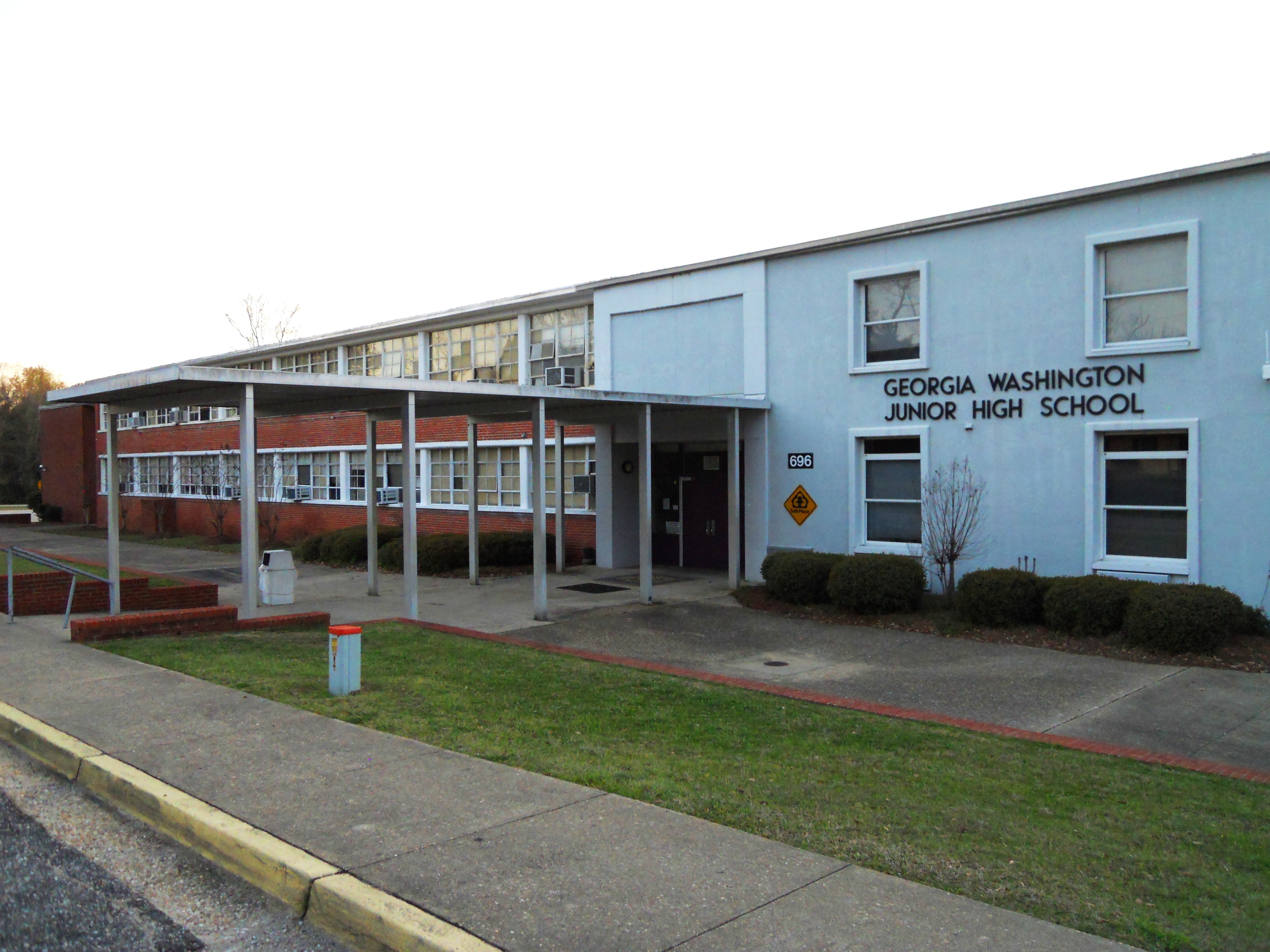
Georgia Washington Junior High School, purchased by Pike Road Schools so it could become Pike Road High School

Pike Road Schools is a school district headquartered in unincorporated Montgomery County, Alabama. It serves the community of Pike Road.

In 2019 Pike Road Schools's board of trustees agreed to allow Maxwell Air Force Base on-post families to send their children to Pike Road High School. In August 2019, of the children who were dependents of military families attached to Maxwell AFB who were enrolled in public schools, 7.59% attended Pike Road schools.

== History ==
Montgomery Public Schools gave approval to the separation of the Pike Road district in 2013.

The Pike Road district began educational operations in 2015, with a K-8 school. It was to add one year per grade level. As a result, the overall student body in the Montgomery district had a higher percentage of African Americans as non-African Americans had left the district.

In 2017 the Montgomery district agreed to sell Georgia Washington Middle School to the Pike Road district. The building was sold so the Pike Road district could quickly acquire space to build a senior high. In 2018 the contract of sale was signed. It became Pike Road High School.
