= Pike Road High School =

School in Montgomery County, Alabama

Coordinates: 32.3553°N 86.1016°W

Location
- 696 Georgia Washington Road; Pike Road, (Montgomery County), Alabama 36064; United States

Information
- Type: Public high school
- Principal: Andrea D. Maness
- Teaching staff: 48.33 (FTE)
- Enrollment: 833 (2024-2025)
- Student to teacher ratio: 17.24
- Colors: Red, blue, and white
- Nickname: Patriots
- Website: Pike Road High School

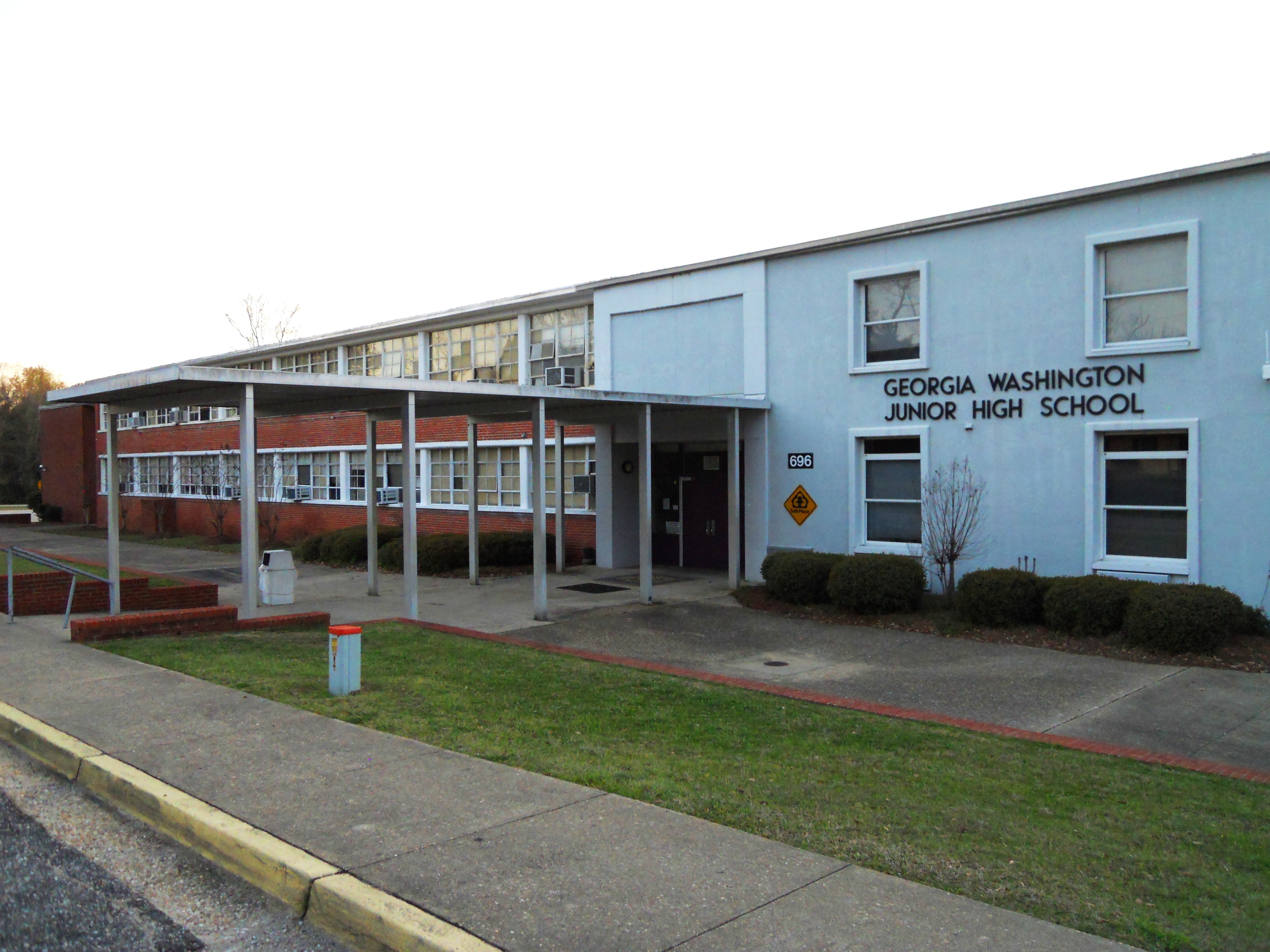
Georgia Washington Middle School prior to its conversion

Pike Road High School is a public school in Pike Road, Alabama, United States, a part of Pike Road Schools. The school site was home to the People's Village School, later renamed Georgia Washington Middle School, until it was acquired by the school system of Pike Road.

The school was formerly in the Mount Meigs community.

== History ==
=== Founding and early history ===
The school was founded in 1893 by Georgia Washington (1851-1952), a woman who was born a slave in Virginia; she was sold along with her mother, away from her father. After emancipation she graduated from Hampton University (1882), an HBCU in Virginia where she taught for a while before moving to Mount Meigs, Alabama, where she started a small school, called the People's Village School. At the time, Mount Meigs was a rural area with a significant African-American population, and the school's first building was a small cabin, 12 by 13 feet, where Washington had four boys as students. Washington is buried on the school grounds.

=== Subsequent history ===
By 1916 enrollment had reached 225. Washington retired in 1936, and after her death in 1952 the school was renamed for her. In 1943 the school was deeded to Montgomery Public Schools, and after a fire destroyed the Mount Meigs Colored Institute in 1948 (then known as Montgomery County Training School), that institute was incorporated into it. It became a junior high school in 1970, and a middle school in 2012. By 2017 enrollment was 600. In 2018, controversy arose because the Montgomery school system, headed by an interim superintendent while under state oversight, announced the sale of the school to the Pike Road Municipal school system; a lawsuit to stop the sale was filed by the Alabama Education Association on behalf of three teachers and parents. The sale would mandate that the school keep its name and that her grave be maintained. The Alabama Supreme Court allowed the sale.

== Notable alumni ==
- Harrison Wallace III (Class of 2021), football player
- Quinshon Judkins (Class of 2022), football player
