= Youth incarceration in the United States =

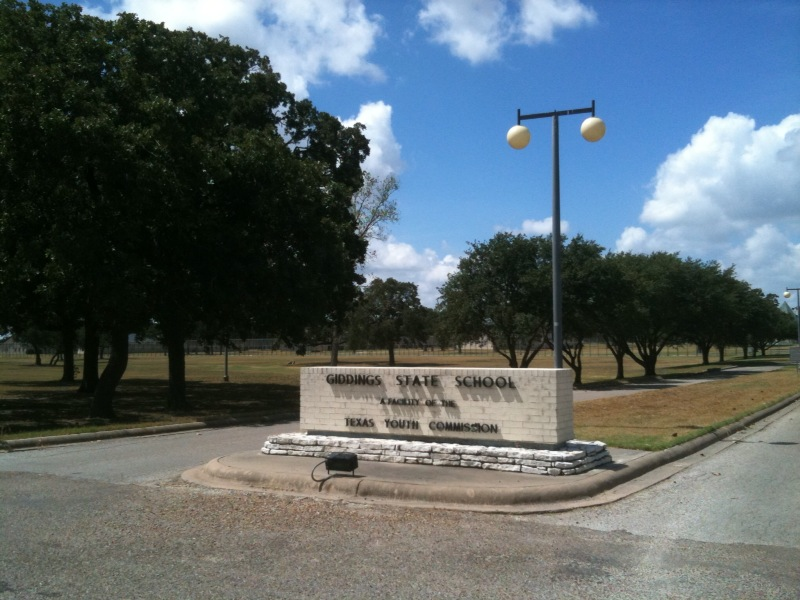
Giddings State School, a Texas Youth Commission facility in unincorporated Lee County, Texas

The United States incarcerates more of its youth than any other country in the world, through the juvenile courts and the adult criminal justice system, which reflects the larger trends in incarceration practices in the United States. In 2010, approximately 70,800 juveniles were incarcerated in youth detention facilities alone. As of 2006, approximately 500,000 youth were brought to detention centers in a given year. This data does not reflect juveniles tried as adults. As of 2013, around 40% were incarcerated in privatized, for-profit facilities.

== The Juvenile Justice and Delinquency Prevention Act ==
Juvenile detention in the US
Year	Male	Female	Total
1997	90,771	14,284	105,055
1999	92,985	14,508	107,493
2001	89,115	15,104	104,219
2003	81,975	14,556	96,531
2006	78,998	13,723	92,721
2007	75,017	11,797	86,814
2010	61,359	9,434	70,793
2011	53,079	8,344	61,423
2013	46,421	7,727	54,148
2015	40,750	7,293	48,043
2017	36,982	6,598	43,580
2019	31,064	5,415	36,479
2021	21,340	3,554	24,894

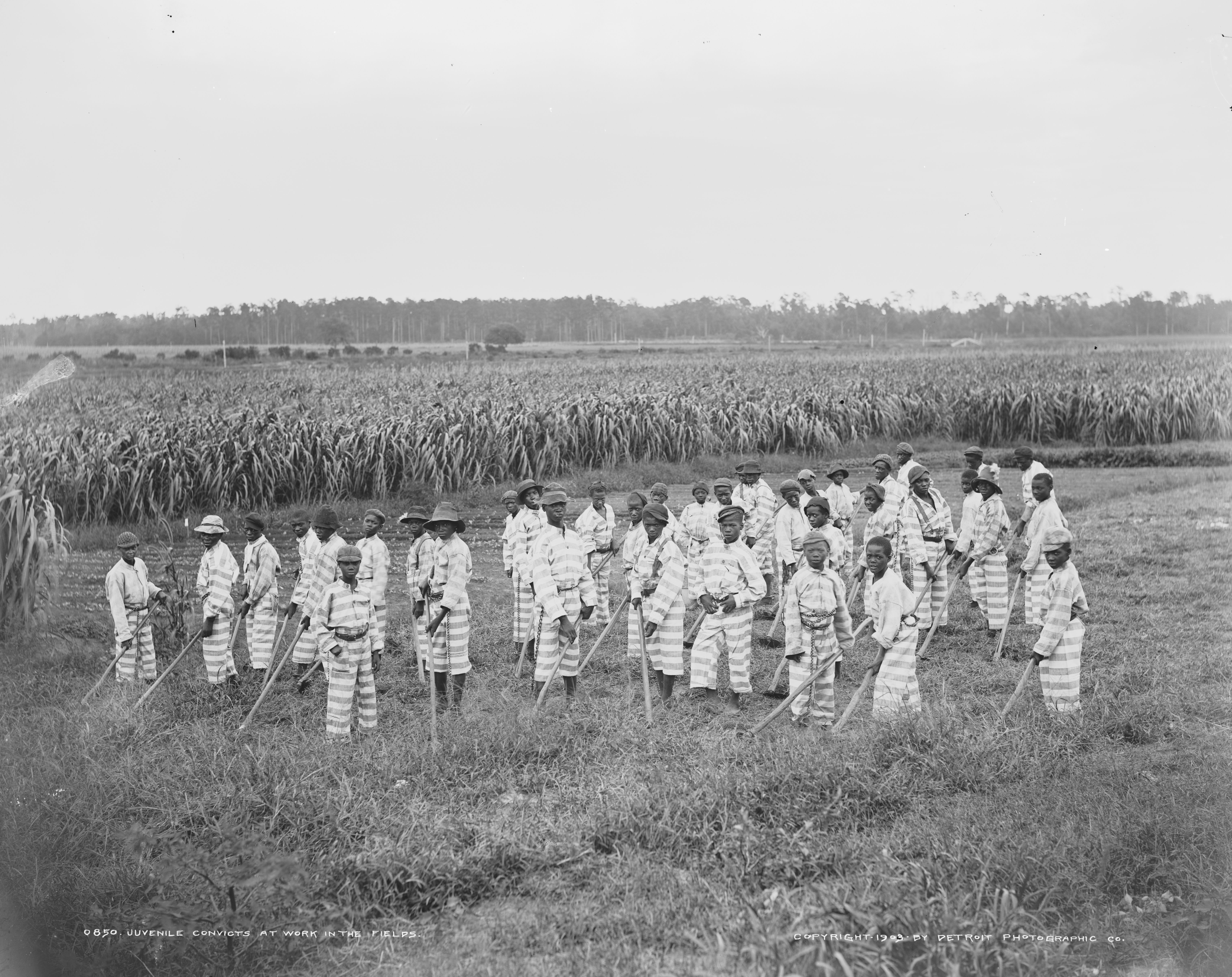
Juvenile convicts working in the fields in a chain gang, photo taken c. 1903

The system that is currently operational in the United States was created under the 1974 Juvenile Justice and Delinquency Prevention Act.

The Juvenile Justice and Delinquency Prevention Act called for a "deinstitutionalization" of juvenile delinquents. The act required that states holding youth within adult prisons for status offenses remove them within a span of two years (this timeframe was adjusted over time). The act also provided program grants to states, based on their youth populations, and created the Office of Juvenile Justice and Delinquency Prevention (OJJDP).

Through reauthorization amendments, additional programs have been added to the original Juvenile Justice and Delinquency Prevention Act. The following list highlights a few of these additions:

1975 – Programs were developed to assist children with learning disabilities who entered the juvenile justice system.

1984 – A new missing and exploited children program was added.

1984 – Strong support was given to programs that strengthened families.

1988 – Studies on prison conditions within the Indian justice system.

1990 – The OJJDP began funding child abuse training programs to instruct judicial personnel and prosecutors.

1983 – A juvenile boot camp program was designed to introduce delinquent youth to a lifestyle of structure and discipline.

1992 – A community prevention grants program gave start-up money to communities for local juvenile crime prevention plans.

== Types of incarceration ==
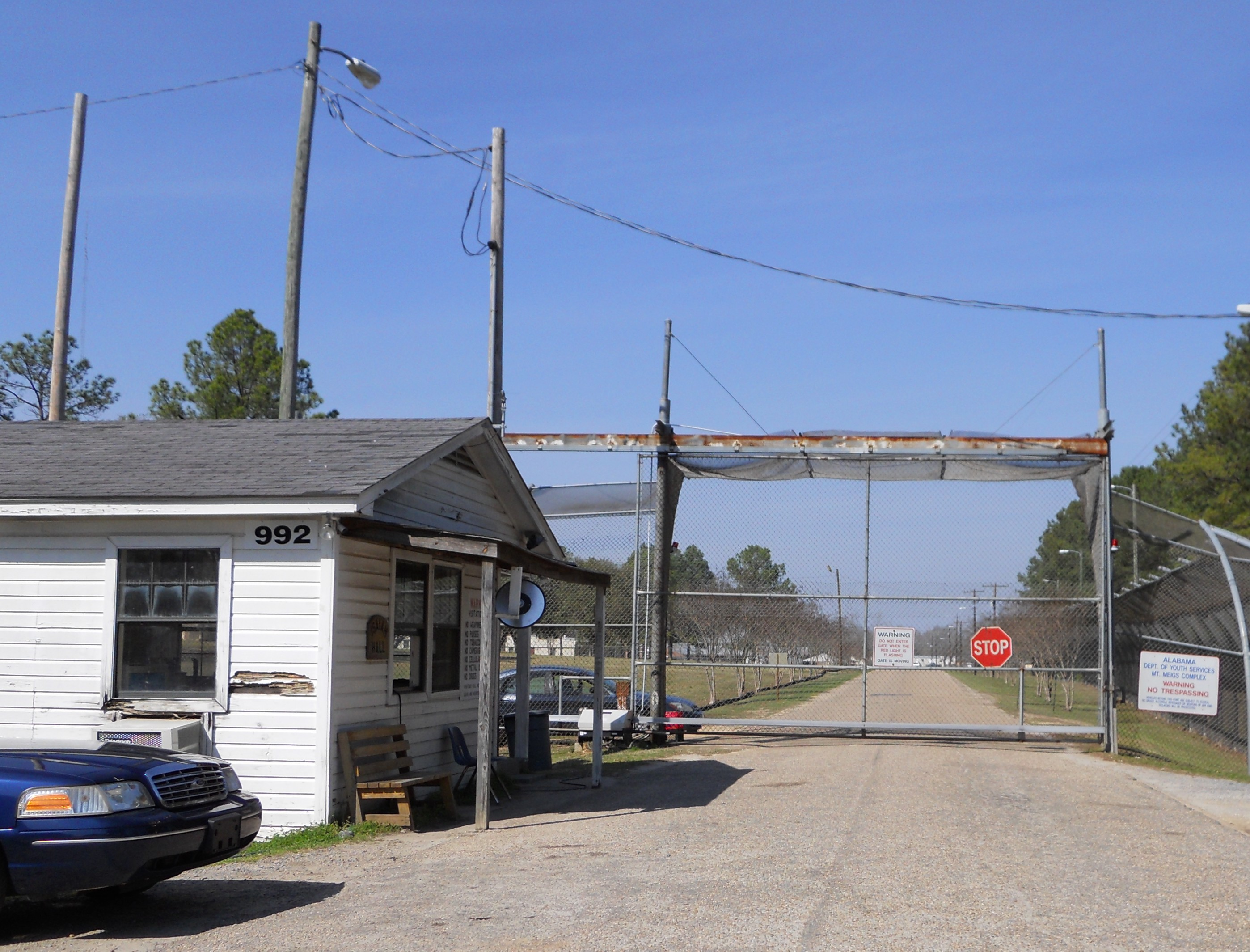
Mount Meigs Campus in Mount Meigs, Montgomery, Alabama, Alabama, of the Alabama Department of Youth Services

Some inmates of the juvenile system are or were "status offenders", children who committed acts that are not crimes for adults, but can get juveniles in trouble with the law. Status offenses include consensual sexual acts, truancy from school, smoking cigarettes, curfew violations, drinking alcohol, running away from one's residence, chronic disobedience of parents, guardians, and/or other authority figures, waywardness, and ungovernability.

== Trends as of 2000 ==
From 1992 through 1997, forty-four states and the District of Columbia passed laws making it easier for juveniles to be tried as adults, calling attention to the growing trend away from the original model for treatment of juveniles in the justice system. A study from 2000 of pretrial services for youth tried as adults in 18 of the country's largest jurisdictions found that the decision to try young offenders as adults was made more often by legislators and prosecutors (at a rate of 85%) than by judges, the people originally endowed with the responsibility for such discretion.

The decreasing distinction between how youth and adults are tried in the criminal justice system has caused many within the legal system, as well as other activists and organizers, to criticize the juvenile justice system.

The "tough on crime" attitudes of these legislative events reflect the stance's popularity in public opinion. This is true of the majority of criminal justice reform policies in the 1990s and 2000s, including California's infamous Three Strikes Law.

Reforms in criminal justice reforms, and juvenile justice in particular, are often fought in the court of public opinion. The popular news media plays a crucial role in promoting the myth of a new generation of young "super-predators" threatening the public. Despite documented decreases in youth crime, particularly in violent crime which indicate a 68% decline in youth homicide in the 1990s, overall media coverage of youth crime is increasing. Despite evidence to the contrary, 62% of respondents in a 1999 survey on youth delinquency believed that youth crime increased. Advocates for juvenile justice reform focus considerable attention on amending public opinion and adjusting the gap between the threats people perceive and the reality of juvenile crime.

== Profiles of youth in custody ==
A 2010 report by the federal Office of Juvenile Justice and Delinquency Prevention and U.S. Department of Justice, "Survey of Youth in Residential Placement: Youth's Needs and Services", used data from more than 7,000 youth in custody gathered during interviews. The report's findings include: 70% of youth in custody reported that they had "had something very bad or terrifying" happen to them in their lives. 67% reported having seen someone severely injured or killed; 26% of those surveyed said felt as if "life was not worth living", and 22% reported having tried to commit suicide at some point in their lives; 84% of the youth surveyed said they had used marijuana, compared to a rate of 30% among their peers in the general population; 30% reported having used crack or cocaine, compared with only 6% in the general population. The report noted a significant gap between the profiles of boys and girls, with girls often reporting more pronounced difficulties: 63% of girls reported having problems with anger, whereas 47% of boys did; 49% of girls reported having hallucinatory experiences, whereas only 16% of boys did; 37% of girls reported having suicidal thoughts and feelings, whereas only 18% of boys did. Facilities that treat such youth also were shown to be inadequate in some core areas, according to the Justice Department. Among youth who reported four or more recent substance-related problems, only about 60% said they had been provided with substance abuse counseling in their current facility. Many youths in custody reported having attention problems and difficulties in school. Once in custody, only 45% report spending 6 hours a day or more in school, meaning that their learning time is below that of the general population.

== Criticism of juvenile justice ==
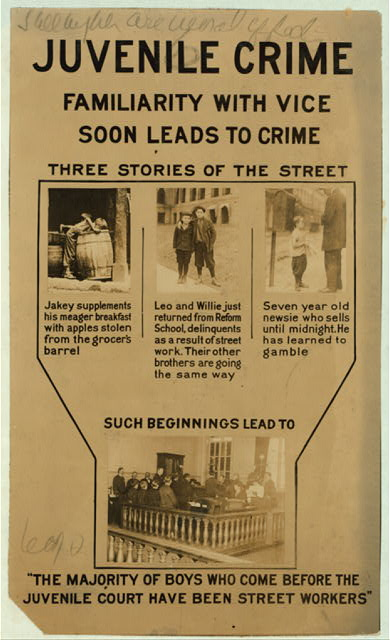
Juvenile crime poster, c. 1913

Critics of the juvenile justice system, like those in the wider prison abolition movement, identify three main markers of the system for critique and reform. They hold that the juvenile justice system is unjust, ineffective, and counter-productive in terms of fulfilling the promise of the prison system, namely the protection of the public from violent offenders.

=== Criticisms of racism ===
Critics of the juvenile justice system believe that the system is unfairly stacked against minority youth. Minority youth are disproportionately represented in incarcerated populations relative to their representation in the general population. A recent report from the National Council on Crime and Delinquency found that minority youth are treated more severely than white youth at every point of contact with the system—from arrest, to detention, to adjudication, to incarceration—even when charged with the same crime. In 1995, African American youths made up 12% of the population, but were arrested at rates double those for Caucasian youths. The trend towards adult adjudication has had implications for the racial make-up of the juvenile prison population as well. Minority youth tried in adult courts are much more likely to be sentenced to serve prison time than white youth offenders arrested for similar crimes.

=== Criticisms based on adverse effects ===
Juvenile detention facilities are often overcrowded and understaffed. The most infamous example of this trend is Cheltenham center in Maryland, which at one point crowded 100 boys into cottages sanctioned for a maximum capacity of 24, with only 3–4 adults supervising. Young people in these environments are subject to brutal violence from their peers as well as staff, who are often overworked, underpaid and under stress. The violence that incarcerated youth experience—fights, stabbings, rapes—is well known to those who work in the criminal justice system, and those who oppose it.

Congregating delinquent youth has a negative impact on behavior—it actually serves to make them more deviant and more of a threat to themselves and others. Social scientists call the phenomenon "peer delinquency training", and have found significantly higher levels of substance abuse, school difficulties, delinquency, violence, and adjustment difficulties in adulthood for offenders detained in congregated settings versus those that were offered treatment in another setting.

Incarceration can aggravate mental illness. According to detention center administrators who testified to United States Congress in a 2004 Special Investigation by the House of Representatives, many incarcerated youths could have avoided incarceration had they received mental health treatment. Detention centers do not promote normal cognitive and emotional development. A recent report indicated that for up to one-third of incarcerated youth suffering from depression, the onset of depression occurred after their transfer to a detention center. These youth face a greater risk of self-injury and suicide. Researchers have found that incarcerated youth engage in self-injurious behaviors at a rate two to four times higher than the general youth population. Furthermore, prison administrative policy often intensifies the risk by responding to suicidal threats in ways that endanger the detainees, such as putting them in solitary confinement.

Detained youth with special needs often fail to return to school upon release. Among those young students receiving remedial education during their detention, roughly 43% do not return to school. Among those that do re-enroll, between two-thirds to three-quarters drop out within a year. Not only does this pose a serious threat to the ex-offender's well-being—high school drop-outs face high unemployment, poor health, shorter life spans, and low income—it also poses a threat to public safety. According to the United States Department of Education, high school drop-outs are 3.5 times more likely to be arrested than high school graduates.

Formerly incarcerated youth face less success in the labor market. On average youth that have spent any amount of time in a youth detention facility work 3–5 weeks less than the average employee over the course of a year. Their interrupted education makes them less competitive, and their experience of incarceration may change them into less stable employees. This lack of success in the workplace is a threat to personal well-being as well as to communities whose youth are incarcerated in large numbers, such as African Americans.

=== Criticisms based on effectiveness ===
Studies indicate that incarcerating young offenders is not the most effective way of curbing delinquency and reducing crime. The relationship between detention of young offenders and the rate of overall youth criminality is not evident. A study of the Federal Bureau of Investigation's arrest data for the 1990s reveals that the rise in detention was unrelated to crime rates. That is, detention as a tactic of controlling young offenders has little to nothing to do with the rate of crime or the "threat" that youth pose to the public.

Studies show that younger people are more likely to thrive in “home-like” settings with healthy social ties to their communities. Community-based responses are more likely to facilitate the long term and or permanent rehabilitation of a Juvenile Offender partaking in deviant and or criminal activities.

While there may be an individual need to incarcerate violent or high-risk youth, most of the young people in prisons, jails and detention centers today—up to 70%—are serving time for nonviolent offenses.

Not all delinquent youth are incarcerated—in fact, as many as one-third of all Americans might engage in delinquent behavior at some point in their youth. But those that are detained or imprisoned are less likely to grow out of their delinquency than those that are not. Criminologists recognize a natural process of desistance called "aging out" of delinquency, through which a person desists their delinquent behavior through maturation and experience. Detaining or incarcerating youth can interrupt or slow down the aging out process, resulting in a longer period of delinquency.

The harm done to the emotional, mental and social development of incarcerated youth, combined with the separation from family and community and the congregation of offenders makes previous incarceration the leading indicator for a repeat offense among young offenders. It is a greater predictor even than weapon possession, gang membership and bad relationships with parents. What these studies tell us is that, far from increasing the public safety and curbing youth crime, detaining and incarcerating young offenders is actually leading to more criminality among youth, and more serious crimes.

As the country grapples with the impact of a growing recession, a cost-benefit analysis of our criminal justice system is especially germane. The cost effectiveness of detention and incarceration scores very low compared with alternative approaches to youth delinquency in a cost-benefit analysis. A 2002 government commissioned study in Washington state revealed that for every one dollar spent on juvenile detention systems, a benefit return of $1.98 in terms of reduced crime and cost of crime to taxpayers was achieved. They found benefit returns ranging from $3.36- $13 for a series of detention alternatives. This study indicates that alternative models are more effective in reducing youth offending in practical and economic terms.

== The movement to end youth incarceration ==
The movement to reduce and end youth incarceration is a widespread collection of thousands of activists, lawyers, community organizers, educators, artists, and youth working on specific legislative and localized initiatives.

Movement goals include shutting down particularly bad prisons and detention centers, demanding better treatment for youth in the system, providing and demanding better representation for young people in court, affecting legislation to curb youth incarceration, working to abolish arrest warrants for young people, and promoting alternatives to incarceration.

There are national organizations and local ones, opposition from inside the criminal justice system and from outside of it. The movement is diverse in many ways, and is difficult to encapsulate in a single entry. Listed below are some examples of movement struggles:

=== The Maryland campaign to Close Cheltenham ===
The Cheltenham Juvenile Detention Center in Cheltenham, Maryland was prisons for boys. Started in 1872 as the House of Reformation for Colored Boys, Cheltenham was home to a wildly overrepresented population of minority youth. But the racial injustice inside the notorious prison was not what ultimately led to its demise.

The conditions at Cheltenham were deplorable. Overcrowded and understaffed, Cheltenham was also flagged by fire safety inspectors as one of the least safe buildings in the state. The antiquated prison structure—each cell had to be individually unlocked, and at times prison staff could not present keys to some cells—was also the site of an enormous amount of brutality and violence.

Local citizens in the Maryland Juvenile Justice Coalition developed the Maryland Campaign to Close Cheltenham in 2001. The campaign involved parents of incarcerated youth, youth activists, and faith leaders from across the state. Through a targeted media campaign to shift public opinion, the campaign succeeded in passing legislation through the annual budget to phase out and close Cheltenham, and to increase state spending on community-based alternative programs for youth offenders.

=== Taking on Tallulah ===
The Tallulah Correctional Center for Youth in Louisiana had been open for only three years when it was first sued by the United States Department of Justice (in collaboration with local activists in the Juvenile Justice Project of Louisiana) for violating the civil rights of youth held in its confines—marking the first time in U.S. history that the federal government has actively sued a state over the conditions of its juvenile detention facilities.

That same year the filthy conditions, brutal violence and chronic understaffing earned the center a citation as "the worst in the nation." In 1999, even after the federal government had taken over partial responsibility for improving conditions, things were so unsafe for the youth that the staff of the center walked out, leaving 400 boys completely unsupervised.

Youth and adult activists appealed to the state legislature to shut down the prison once and for all. But their aspirations didn't stop with the abolition of one prison—they sought to redefine the juvenile justice system in the state, to change it from one based almost entirely on incarceration and punishment to a new system focusing on community-based alternatives to incarceration.

In 2003 the state of Louisiana became nationally recognized for its leadership in reforming a broken juvenile justice system. With the passage of the Juvenile Justice Reform Act of 2003 (Act 1225), then Governor Kathleen Blanco and the Louisiana State Legislature ushered in a period of reform in which the notoriously brutal Tallulah prison for youth was shut down, conditions were improved in other abusive youth prisons throughout the state, and a commitment was made to both the increased use of alternatives to incarceration for youth and to revamping secure care prisons to be small, therapeutic facilities that were regionalized to keep children closer to their families.

Before the passage of Act 1225, over two thousand children were held in prison in Louisiana. Today the system holds just over 500 children statewide. In 1998 the rate of recidivism, or children returning to prison after release, was 56% as compared to 11% today. This decrease in the number of children incarcerated has contributed to an increase in public safety.

=== Proposition 21 in California ===
In 2001 California residents passed Proposition 21, a multi-faceted proposition designed to be tough on youth crime, incorporating many youth offenders into the adult criminal justice jurisdiction.

Opponents to this law included activists from Californians for Justice, Critical Resistance, the Youth Force Coalition, the Ella Baker Center for Human Rights, and the American Civil Liberties Union. Advocates in the ACLU challenged many portions of the law, including a provision automatically sentencing youth 14–17 years old in adult court. This portion of the law was struck down by the California Courts of Appeal in 2001.

=== Opposing zero-tolerance policies ===
The term "zero tolerance" is not defined in law or regulation; nor is there a single widely accepted practice definition. The United States Department of Education, National Center for Education Statistics, defined zero tolerance as "a policy that mandates predetermined consequences or punishments for specified offenses". The purpose of zero-tolerance policies, according to their proponents, is to send a message that certain kinds of behaviors are not tolerable on school grounds. About 94% of public schools in the United States have zero-tolerance policies for guns; 91% for other weapons; 88% for drugs; 87% for alcohol and 79% for tobacco.

Opposition to zero-tolerance policies, especially at the local level, focus on critiques including charges that the program is discriminatory, unconstitutional, harmful to schools and students, ineptly implemented, and provides harsh punishment (suspension of education) for minor offenses (possession of tobacco).

A few infamous cases have been used by opposition groups, such as Amnesty International, to further their case against the policy. The Center for Juvenile and Criminal Justice released a story in 2003 about a 13-year-old girl in Tuscaloosa, Alabama arrested and detained for 5 weeks for possession of what was thought to be marijuana, but turned out to be oregano. The zero-tolerance practice in Illinois of sending any youth charged with drug crimes within 1,000 feet of any school or public housing project directly to adult court has resulted in the largest racial disparity in the country—over 99% of youth affected by this policy were minority youth.

Opposition to zero-tolerance policies nationwide and locally is broad and growing. Organizational leadership has been provided nationally by Amnesty International and the American Bar Association, who has officially opposed such policies since 2001.

=== Promoting alternatives: the JDAI ===
Most activists in the movement to end youth incarceration believe that the best way to mitigate the impact of detention and incarceration on our youth is to reduce the number of youth that pass through the system. By providing credible alternatives to incarceration, this portion of the movement provides opportunities for communities to treat, rather than punish, young offenders—much the way that the juvenile justice system was founded to do.

The Juvenile Detention Alternatives Initiative (JDAI) is a private-public partnership being implemented nationwide, with pilot programs in California, Oregon, New Mexico and Illinois. Their goal is to make sure that locked detention is used only when absolutely necessary. As of 2003, the JDAI had produced some promising results from their programs. Detention center populations fell by between 14% and 88% in JDAI counties over the course of 7 years (1996–2003). These same counties saw declines in juvenile arrests (an indicator of overall juvenile crime rates) during the same time period ranging from 37 to 54%.

Alternatives for juvenile detention centers for rehabilitation and reentry processes for those already incarcerated requires the work of counselors who understand the psychology of these individuals. Effective diversion programs are the best strategy to ensure children and youth to stay away from detention centers. Diversion programs could include everything from counseling to peer mentoring in order to improve the relationship in the community and remove the stigma of criminal youth. There are solutions proven effective for those communities that impose them. For example, intervention centers are a progressive solution where trouble kids get the opportunity to be disciplined to correct behavior but the process involves family involvement, community service activities, and one-on-one therapy. Legislation work such as Colorado's Smart School Discipline Law work to implement prevention strategies in an early stage starting in school, revise and provide adequate training to police officers in order to find proper disciplinary practice when dealing with trouble students. The initiative has become part of a bigger network to be implemented nationwide.

== Sociological and environmental theories ==
These Perspectives shifts the focus from the Minor that is showing deviant behavior; and puts it onto the external social structure, conditions with in one’s community, and their peer dynamics. This helps to further explain why people, especially younger people, act the way they do.

=== General strain theory ===
Poses the idea that adolescents the tend to experience more chronic stress ( negative home environments, school bullying, trauma, etc.) are more likely to experience strong waves of negative emotions like anger and frustration. These deepened waves of emotions when not managed correctly can be expressed in delinquent and or deviant behavior.

=== Social disorganization theory ===
Argues that deviant and or criminal behavior is rooted in lower income neighborhoods. These causes for social ties between the people in society to be weak. This allows for a disconnect with in the same community which caused deviant behavior to thrive.

=== Differential association theory ===
suggests that criminal and or deviant behavior is something that can be learned and taught. Continuous exposure to interactions with people who hold deviant qualities or characteristics will make any one, especially a younger person, to model the same unlawful behavior.

== See also ==
- American juvenile justice system
- Juvenile court
- Juvenile delinquency in the United States
- Kids for cash scandal
- Prison-industrial complex
- School-to-prison pipeline
- Trial as an adult in the United States
