= Cornelia Bowen =

African American teacher and school founder

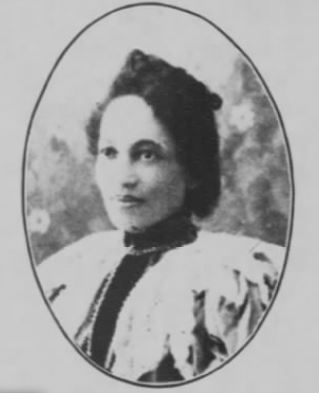
- 1902
- Born: September 24, 1865 near Tuskegee, Macon County, Alabama
- Died: July 9, 1934 (aged 68); Mount Meigs, Montgomery County, Alabama
- Occupations: teacher, educator, school founder and administrator, writer
- Years active: 1885–1934
- Known for: founding Mt. Meigs Colored Institute and Negro Boys' Reformatory

Cornelia Bowen (1865–1934) was an African American teacher and school founder from Alabama. She was in the first graduating class of the Tuskegee Institute and went on to found the Mount Meigs Colored Institute as well as the Mt. Meigs Negro Boys' Reformatory. Based on the principles of the Tuskegee Institute, where she was trained, Bowen created industrial schools to teach students to thrive from their own industry. She was a member of both the state and national Colored Women's Federated Clubs and served as an officer of both organizations. She also was elected as the first woman president of the Alabama Negro Teacher's Association.

== Early life ==
Cornelia Bowen was born September 24, 1865 (Note: Smith gives Bowen's birth date as 1858, however, she is not shown on the 1870 federal census with her family. Who’s Who of the Colored Race gives her birth date as 24 September 1870 however, the 1880 census shows her age as sixteen, thus being born in 1864 or 1865. As numerous accounts of her life state that her mother was a slave, the 1858 date seems implausible, as Cornelia would have been born a slave were she born prior to the Civil War's end.) near Tuskegee, Alabama, on the plantation owned by Colonel William B. Bowen, to Sophia (née Carroll) and Henry Clay Bowen (Bowan). Col. Bowen owned the property upon which the Tuskegee Institute would later be constructed. Her mother was a slave, who had been born in Baltimore, Maryland, and taught to read by her master's daughter, though she could not write. Bowen was described as a tall, slender mulatto. The estate was located about 1 mi (1.6 km) to the south of town and the plantation house was burned during the Civil War. The cabin in which Bowen had been born, another cabin, the chicken house and a stable were all that was left of the estate when Booker T. Washington bought the property as the new site of the Tuskegee Normal School in 1881.

As a child, Bowen was tutored by a white woman known to her mother, who taught her to read the McGuffey Readers before she began her formal training in the schools in Tuskegee. The public school for blacks on Zion Hill was closed when Tuskegee Normal School opened and Bowen entered the school after passing the required examination. When she graduated in 1885, in the first graduating class, Bowen received a Peabody medal for her scholastic excellence.

== Career ==
Upon completion of her education, Bowen became the principal at the Children's House, or training facility of Tuskegee Normal School. After several terms, she was advised by Washington of an opportunity to work near Mt. Meigs, Alabama, in Waugh. E. N. Pierce of Plainfield, Connecticut, who had inherited the "Old Carter Place, wanted to found a smaller school on the model of Tuskegee for the community in Mt. Meigs. Bowen traveled to the area and found that it was poverty stricken with dilapidated facilities. The former plantation area was full of illiterate sharecroppers whose cotton was mortgaged before seeds were planted. They had no knowledge of crop rotation or planting for food, owning their own property, and most lived in one-room shacks. The only school was open for three months a year and out of the 300 students who had attended it, only five could read. Bowen first organized a Sunday school to teach them scriptures and then went door-to-door meeting the families in the community to establish a rapport and recruit the mothers into meeting to learn about child rearing.

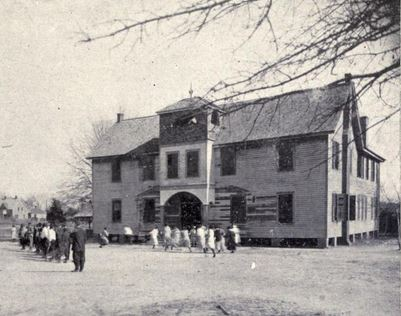
Mount Meigs Colored Institute

Bowen created a community center, where she taught women and girls cooking, housekeeping and sewing, as well as instilling child-raising skills, grooming, exercise and nutrition. She taught the men and boys to be better husbands, farmers and the benefits of ownership of their own land. Her method was to lead by example, renting her own land, she hired a man to plow it. Sowing the seed, for cotton, corn and pumpkin; hoeing and plowing the weeds; and harvesting the crop, she netted a profit of $30.50 from her $50 sale. Borrowing $1735 from Pierce she built a two-story frame building, which would become a boarding and day school. Within seven years, the community had paid back the debt in full, though sometimes with livestock, which Bowen would sell in Montgomery to add the money to the debt repayment fund. Besides teaching grammar and arithmetic, Bowen taught life-skills like farming, gardening, and raising bees, livestock and poultry. As she had nearly three hundred students and only five who could read, Bowen had the five readers assist her in teaching the others with the assistance of a preacher's son, who helped without pay. Within three years, she was able to hire an assistant.

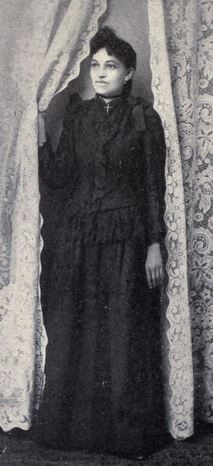
Cornelia Bowen

Each summer, Bowen would travel north to raise funds for her school and in the process, further her own education. In 1893, she attended the Columbia Teachers' College in New York City and later between 1898 and 1900 attended Queen Margaret College in Glasgow. She attained a bachelor's degree from Straight College in New Orleans and later, earned a master's degree from Battle Creek College with a thesis entitled Juvenile Crime among Negroes in Alabama. In addition, she would recuperate for part of each summer at the Battle Creek Sanitarium, and occasionally was accompanied by her sister Katie, who also taught at Mt. Meigs. A devotee of Muscular Christianity, Bowen believed that good health was achieved by proper nourishment and exercise and that participation in athletics also taught a respect for cooperation, rules, self-discipline, as well as the benefits of work. She participated in the "back to nature" movement, of intellectuals who ate a predominantly vegetarian diet, exercised and at least once spent time in a naturist community.

In 1896 when the Afro-American Women's League was formed in Boston, Bowen was one of the founding members. By 1904, she was the corresponding secretary of the organization and that same year was elected president of the Alabama State Colored Women's Federated Clubs. She continued to serve as state president for more than a decade. In 1897, she elected as vice president of the Alabama Negro Teacher's Association and would hold the post until at least 1910. Bowen attended many conferences throughout the United States speaking to women's groups and in 1905 published a short autobiography called A Woman's Work. She used her membership in these women's organizations to improve the status of African Americans and raise funds for her school. Bowen also published many articles and poems, as well as participated in many educational programs aimed at improving the lives of young people.

In 1906, Bowen and the women's club became involved in the need for a boy's reformatory. White women had successfully lobbied for the state to send boys to reform school instead of prison, but no similar provisions had been made for black youth. The Colored Women's Federated Clubs pled for the legislature to establish a facility, but when they were unsuccessful, Bowen sold the club twenty acres to build a facility. Bowen founded a second school, operated on the same farm principal as the institute, which was maintained solely by the black clubwomen. They continued lobbying the Alabama legislature, as well as judges and newspaper editors to have the state take over the administration of the school. They were finally successful in 1911 and the state took over management of the Alabama Reform School for Juvenile Negro Law-Breakers. Bowen would continue serving for at least a decade as one of the trustees of the reformatory. She also taught at the reformatory, until 1923. One of her students was Satchel Paige, who she encouraged to participate in sports as well as choir.

In 1920, Bowen gave the 400 acres remaining in the Mount Meigs Institute to the state of Alabama with the proviso that they would pay her for the holdings when they officially took over the school. She continued to serve as principal even after the state changed the name to the Montgomery County Training School around 1923 or 1924. She served as principal until at least 1929 and also taught for five years at the Alabama State Teachers College. Bowen became the first woman president of the Alabama Negro Teacher's Association in 1927.

== Death and legacy ==
Bowen died in July 1934 in Mount Meigs, Montgomery County, Alabama. Bowen's philanthropy extended long after her death, having donated much of the land that the schools were founded on to the state. The two schools she founded are both still operational. The institute is currently known as Georgia Washington High School and the reformatory is known as Mount Meigs Campus.
