= Mount Meigs Colored Institute =

Reform school for African-Americans in Mount Meigs, Alabama US

Coordinates: 32°22′43″N 86°5′5″W

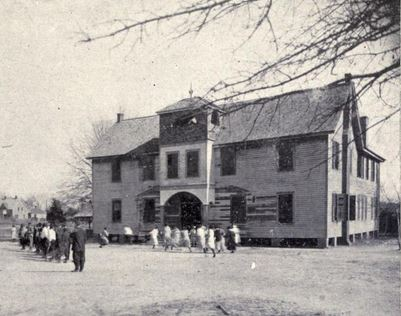
Mount Meigs Colored Institute, 1919

The Mount Meigs Colored Institute (also Montgomery County Training School) was a reform school founded by Cornelia Bowen for African-Americans in Mount Meigs, Alabama, an unincorporated community in Montgomery County, Alabama.

== History ==
The school was founded in 1888 as a single-room school; four years later, its students moved into a two-story facility built for the purpose. The work of constructing the new building was done by male students. The school's models were Tuskegee Institute and Hampton Institute, and it advocated vocational schooling, teaching such skills as farming, carpentry, blacksmithing—the hope was that the school would be able to provide its own food and that students would contribute to white and black communities.

Besides the normal classes of instruction, the school taught farming, blacksmithing, and wheelwriting to boys, and sewing and cooking to girls. Students at the school also farmed the nine acres of land that were under cultivation and grew crops included cotton, sugar cane, corn, peas, and potatoes. All of which, besides cotton which was sold, were used by the school.

The board that ran the school consisted of twelve people: six whites, all from out of state, and six blacks, all local, including Booker T. Washington. For all practical purposes the school in its day-to-day operation was run by African-Americans. It proved harder than expected to make the school as financially independent as was envisioned; support came through the efforts of Bowen, who proved a tireless fundraiser and got the Alabama Federation of Colored Women's Clubs to support the school. With their help additional acreage was acquired; the clubs were particularly appalled by the numbers of black young men in the area who ended up incarcerated in adult prisons, and supporting the school allowed young boys to stay out of prison—one such student was Satchel Paige.

By 1908 a second institution was opened, the later state-run Mount Meigs Campus.

The school was destroyed by a fire in 1948; at that time, it was known as the Montgomery County Training School. After the fire, the Montgomery County Board of Education decided to consolidate the school with the People's Village School, which was founded by Georgia Washington. The new school was rebuilt on the site of the People's Village School and named Georgia Washington High School. In 1974, the school was converted to a junior high school and renamed Georgia Washington Middle School. In 2018, the town Pike Road paid $9.85 million for the school campus, agreeing to the terms that Georgia Washington’s name would stay on the school and also that her grave, which is on the school’s property, be maintained. The school is now the Pike Road High School.
