= Chalkville Campus =

Correctional facility in Alabama, US

Coordinates: 33.673°N 86.628°W

Chalkville Campus was a correctional facility for girls of the Alabama Department of Youth Services, in the Chalkville area, in Jefferson County, Alabama.

In 1909 the Protestant Women of Birmingham created a youth corrections program that became the Chalkville campus.

By 2002 100 former students who attended in the period 1993 to 2001 accused the school of abuse, with forty of them joining a lawsuit in federal court. The State of Alabama settled the lawsuit for $12,500,000. Some persons lost their jobs.

By 2012 enrollment was down to 18, and the department planned to retire the Chalkville campus and move the girls elsewhere. In January 2012 a tornado destroyed 11 of the buildings, though no injuries resulted. The facility abruptly closed as a result. The Mount Meigs Campus began housing delinquent girls.
