= Chalkville, Alabama =

- Neighborhood of Clay, Alabama; Former Census designated place
- Location in Jefferson County and the state of Alabama
- Coordinates: 33°40′4″N 86°38′58″W
- Country: United States
- State: Alabama
- County: Jefferson

Area
  - Total: 2.9 sq mi (7.6 km^{2})
  - Land: 2.9 sq mi (7.5 km^{2})
  - Water: 0.039 sq mi (0.1 km^{2})
- Elevation: 873 ft (266 m)

Population (2000)
  - Total: 3,829
  - Density: 1,305/sq mi (503.8/km^{2})
- Time zone: UTC-6 (Central (CST))
  - Summer (DST): UTC-5 (CDT)
- FIPS code: 01-13720
- GNIS feature ID: 0115909

Chalkville is a former census-designated place in Jefferson County, Alabama, United States that is now a neighborhood of the city of Clay. At the 2000 census the population was 3,829.

== Geography ==
Chalkville is located at 33°40′4″N 86°38′59″W (33.667902, -86.649643).

According to the U.S. Census Bureau, the community has a total area of 2.9 square miles (7.5 km^{2}), of which 2.9 square miles (7.5 km^{2}) is land and 0.04 square miles (0.10 km^{2}) (1.03%) is water.

== Demographics ==
Note: Census demographic data were enumerated for the Census-Designated Place (CDP) for somewhat different boundaries prior to incorporation in 2004. The 1990 population of 10,987 was for the CDP of Pinson-Clay-Chalkville, which was subdivided in 2000 into their own separate CDPs. Therefore, exact population for the Chalkville portion in 1990 cannot be ascertained

Chalkville CDP, Alabama – Racial and ethnic composition Note: the US Census treats Hispanic/Latino as an ethnic category. This table excludes Latinos from the racial categories and assigns them to a separate category. Hispanics/Latinos may be of any race.
Race / Ethnicity (NH = Non-Hispanic)	Pop 2000	2000
White alone (NH)	3,667	95.77%
Black or African American alone (NH)	89	2.32%
Native American or Alaska Native alone (NH)	9	0.24%
Asian alone (NH)	18	0.47%
Native Hawaiian or Pacific Islander alone (NH)	2	0.05%
Other race alone (NH)	3	0.08%
Mixed race or Multiracial (NH)	19	0.50%
Hispanic or Latino (any race)	22	0.57%
Total	3,829	100.00%

As of the census of 2000, there were 3,829 people, 1,275 households, and 1,105 families residing in the community. The population density was 1,330.0 inhabitants per square mile (513.5/km^{2}). There were 1,313 housing units at an average density of 456.1 per square mile (176.1/km^{2}). The racial makeup of the community was 96.32% White, 2.32% Black or African American, 0.24% Native American, 0.47% Asian, 0.05% Pacific Islander, 0.08% from other races, and 0.52% from two or more races. 0.57% of the population were Hispanic or Latino of any race.

There were 1,275 households, out of which 49.5% had children under the age of 18 living with them, 74.1% were married couples living together, 9.9% had a female householder with no husband present, and 13.3% were non-families. 10.9% of all households were made up of individuals, and 2.7% had someone living alone who was 65 years of age or older. The average household size was 2.97 and the average family size was 3.21.

In the community, the population was spread out, with 29.8% under the age of 18, 7.7% from 18 to 24, 32.9% from 25 to 44, 22.4% from 45 to 64, and 7.2% who were 65 years of age or older. The median age was 35 years. For every 100 females, there were 95.9 males. For every 100 females age 18 and over, there were 93.9 males.

The median income for a household in the community was $55,114, and the median income for a family was $56,518. Males had a median income of $34,977 versus $29,266 for females. The per capita income for the community was $19,929. About 2.8% of families and 2.3% of the population were below the poverty line, including none of those under age 18 and 12.9% of those age 65 or over.

== Government and infrastructure ==
The Alabama Department of Youth Services formerly maintained the Chalkville Campus. It ended operations after a tornado in January 2012.
