= Georgia Washington (educator) =

African-American educator (1851–1952)

Georgia A. Washington
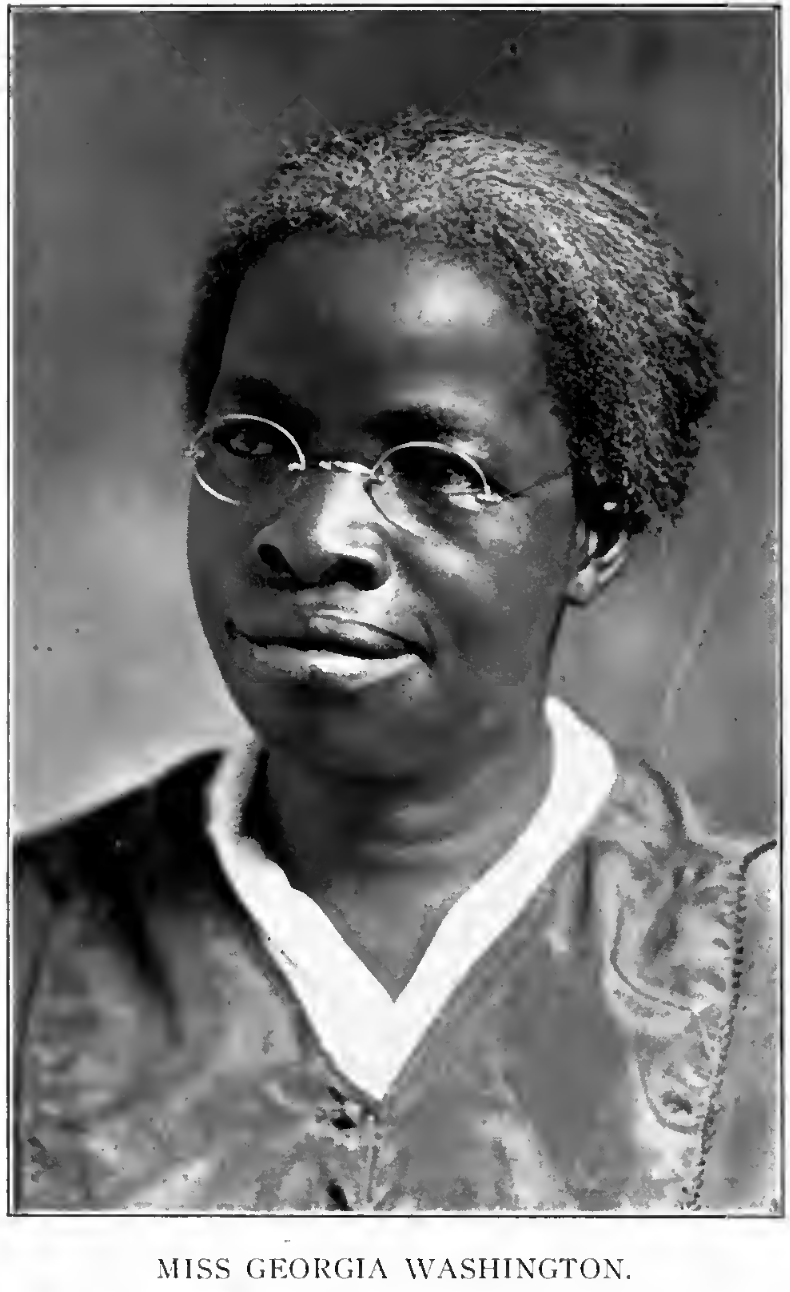
- Born: November 23, 1851
- Died: October 5, 1952 (aged 100); Mount Meigs, Alabama, US
- Burial place: Mount Meigs, Alabama, US
- Education: Hampton Normal and Agricultural Institute (now Hampton University)
- Occupation: Teacher

Georgia A. Washington (November 23, 1851 – October 5, 1952) was an African-American teacher who established the People's Village school in Mount Meigs, Alabama, bringing education to the African-American population in the area. She also educated the local adults in the area, teaching women skills like sewing and men how to farm. Focusing on farming in the area made the town self-sustaining. Her guidance focused on community growth, and she maintained positive relationships with white school board members to ensure the success of her school. Today, her school and the Mt. Meigs community still stand and flourish in her memory.

== Early life ==
Georgia Washington was born into slavery with her mother and brother, having been sold away from her father. After their emancipation, her mother found a living with their old master, and Washington was tasked with taking care of the other children that lived in the home. Alongside this responsibility, Washington began the process of learning to read. Household duties made it difficult for Washington to become a pupil, but her mother—being convinced by a school teacher who graduated from the Hampton Normal and Agricultural Institute (now Hampton University)—allowed Washington to go off to school for a few months in 1876. She quickly learned to write, and the same teacher persuaded her and her mother to let Washington attend Hampton.

After graduating in 1882, Washington became a teacher in the area. Then, she traveled down to Calhoun, Alabama with two other Hampton graduates to create a school. After about a year, Washington left after being recruited by Booker T. Washington to establish her own school known as the People's Village in Mt. Meigs, Alabama.

=== Community involvement ===
Georgia Washington had a reputation for upholding excellency and pouring her life into the school. She recruited fellow Hampton graduates as teachers, held community meetings to help the citizens be self-sustaining, and retired after 43 years of teaching.

In 1908, she was arrested for grand larceny, allegedly stealing $2.37 from Maggie Johnson, a member of the Montgomery School Board. By 1908 standards, this monetary amount would not have been considered grand larceny. The details of her trial and its outcome are currently unknown.

Washington was also an active member of local, state, and national communities, even noted as being one of the "notable negroes" of the time. In 1914, she was recorded as an active member of the State Negro Business League where she participated in a talk titled "The Negro Teacher's Duty." In 1918, she was listed as a subscriber to the Third Liberty Loan.

Washington was also an attendee of the State Federation of Women's Clubs' in 1919. In one meeting, plans for a Girl's Rescue Home in Mt. Meigs were perfected and set into motion. The funds raised at this meeting also established the Boy's Reformatory and made it a state institution. In 1925, Georgia Washington was noted as leading the greetings for an annual teacher meeting for the county, which outlined hopes for new school buildings and a continued focus for furthering African American education.

== People's Village school ==
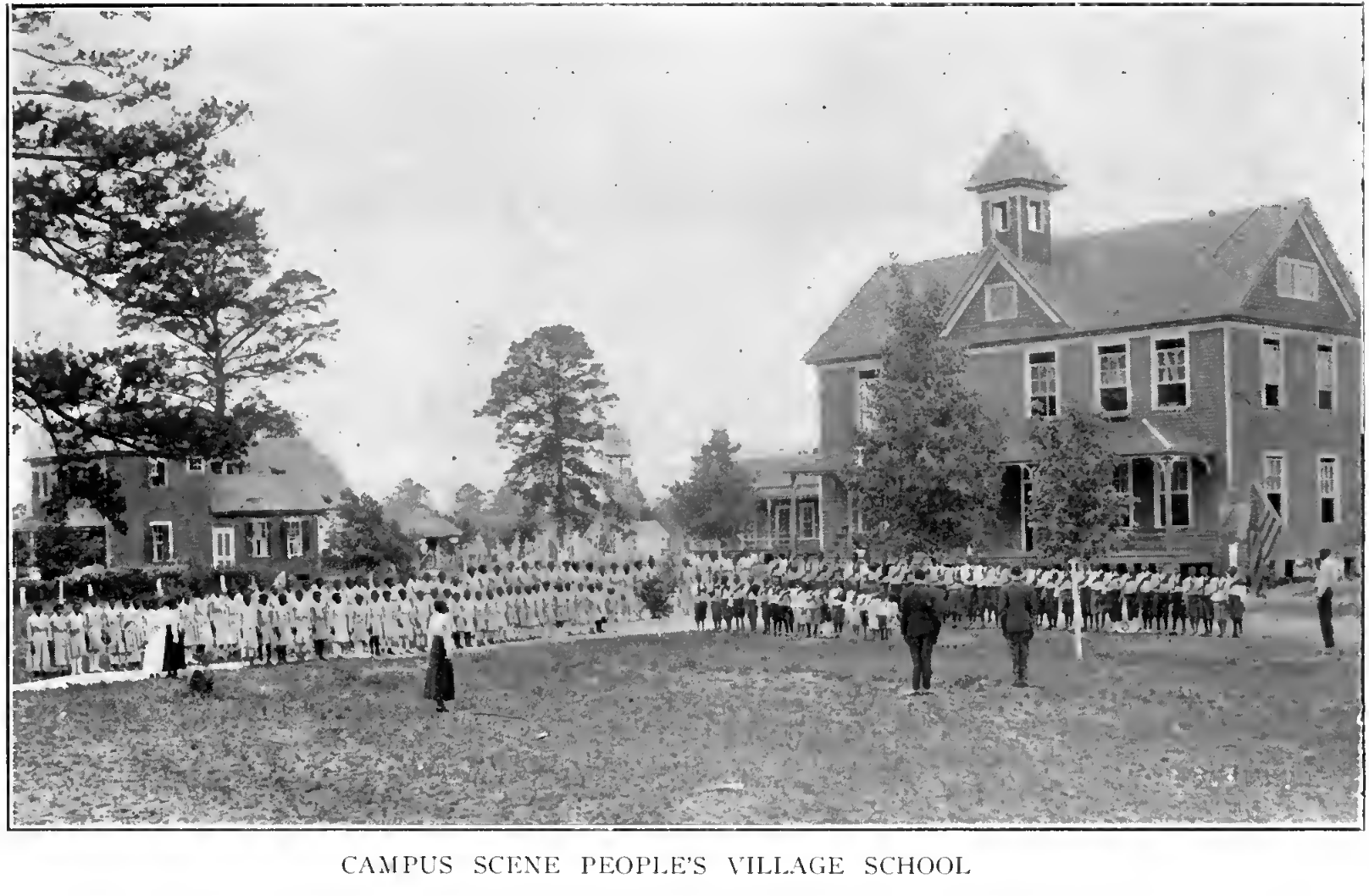
People's Village school, pre-1919

The People's Village school, also called the Mt. Meigs Industrial school in 1914, was established in 1893. Four boys were the first class to attend. The school quickly grew, and the community of Mt. Meigs rallied together to build new buildings, bring on more teachers, and a Board of Trustees was established--two white men were on it. The school expanded at a rapid pace. At the end of the first year, there were 100 boys and girls; the end of the second year saw 230 students and classes had to be moved to Antioch Baptist Church. By 1898, a two-story school building was erected. It was the first building in Mt. Meigs to have electric lights.

By 1905, ledgers recorded that Washington owned the north half of the northeast quarter of southeast quarter Section 24 Township 16 Range 19, multiple acres of land. She paid $5.85 for the May term of 1905's land tax for Montgomery County.

By 1916, the school had five teachers and boasted 225 students on 27 acres of land on which they learned to farm and provide for themselves. Outside the children, Washington taught community members how to leverage their land and farms for economic stability. By this time, the school was valued at $9,000. Graduates went on to attend colleges like Tuskegee, Meharry Medical College, and more.

The school grew to also include five buildings, including a Girl's Reformatory, Boy's Reformatory, and a teachers' home. As far as school work, contemporary newspapers report a good elementary course but that the People’s Village School stresses the “essentials.” Girls learn cooking, sewing, and sanitation while the boys learned to work on the farm. The focus on farming often made People's Village the host of farming unions, establishing regular community events to bolster community dedication to farming.

People's Village also hosted many clubs for the students, including the Village School Glee Club, directed by Lorenzo Hall, a fellow Hampton graduate alongside Washington. This club focused on singing entirely "negro songs," and the school eventually developed an auditorium in 1908 for their performances and other community meetings. Washington personally led the Peoples Village School Red Cross Society, which made clothing for overseas soldiers in 1918.

In 1921, a hygiene contest took place amongst 11 colored schools in the area in accordance with County Health Officers. It included measuring personal hygiene but also school cleanliness and gardening. People's Village placed second.

=== School reputation and impact ===
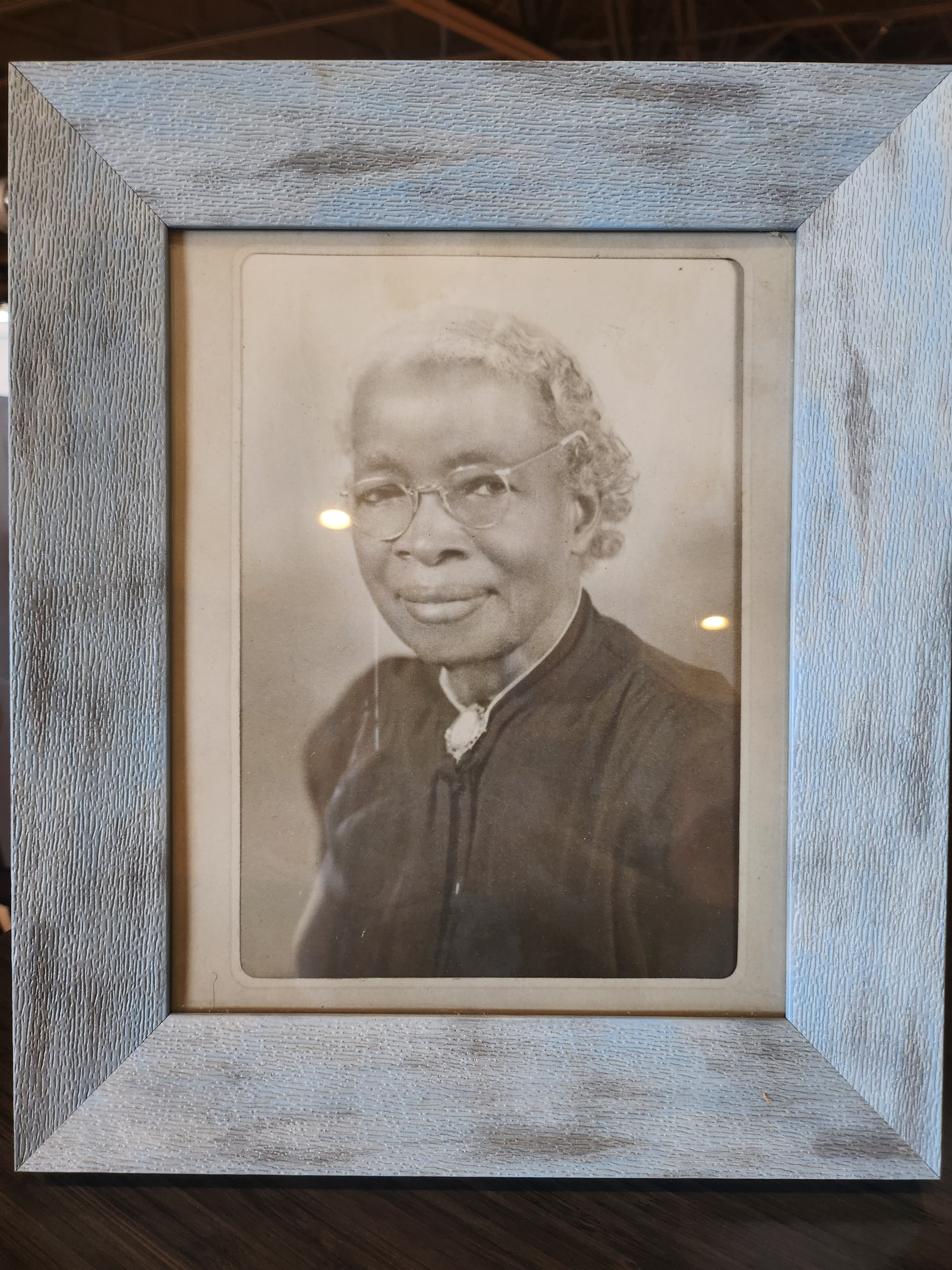
Georgia A Washington when older

Outside the students enrolled, Georgia Washington taught sewing, household management, and farming for adults in a "colored school," extending her teaching practices beyond young students. Graduates of the People's Village often stayed in the area to continue farming. Washington's efforts made the local white leaders of Montgomery County take notice, leading to maintained support and friendship for the growth of the school. A few of these white friends ended up on Washington's Board of Trustees.

In 1916, Washington was interviewed in The Montgomery Advertiser in a piece about negro progress in which she spoke about People's Village upon the end of its 22nd term. She is quoted saying,

I have had the opportunity and pleasure of looking into the schools taught throughout Alabama by students who have earned our certificate and I have found them doing excellent work. Our graduates have also won the respect and good-will of the people among whom they live and work. They have helped communities to improve the schoolhouses, raise money for the teachers and for school equipment, introduced cooking and sewing in the rural schools. Those graduates of our school who have been able to go away and learn trades are also doing very-efficient work... The aim of the school is, not to fit young men and women for teachers, but to give them a start and a taste for better things. We expect Tuskegee, Hampton Institute, and other schools, better fitted in every way for the teaching of trades, to do the rest of the needed work for these children.

In 1920, Dr. Robert R. Motion, principal of the Tuskegee Institute, gave a speech at the Peoples Village upon the conclusion of its 27th year. He talked about how African Americans need to consider their advantages to continue doing great things but warns that too many have become sensitive about their ideas of independence and declared that he will stay in the south. Washinton's personal beliefs on this topic is uncertain, but having this speech take place at her school demonstrates continued notoriety in the area.

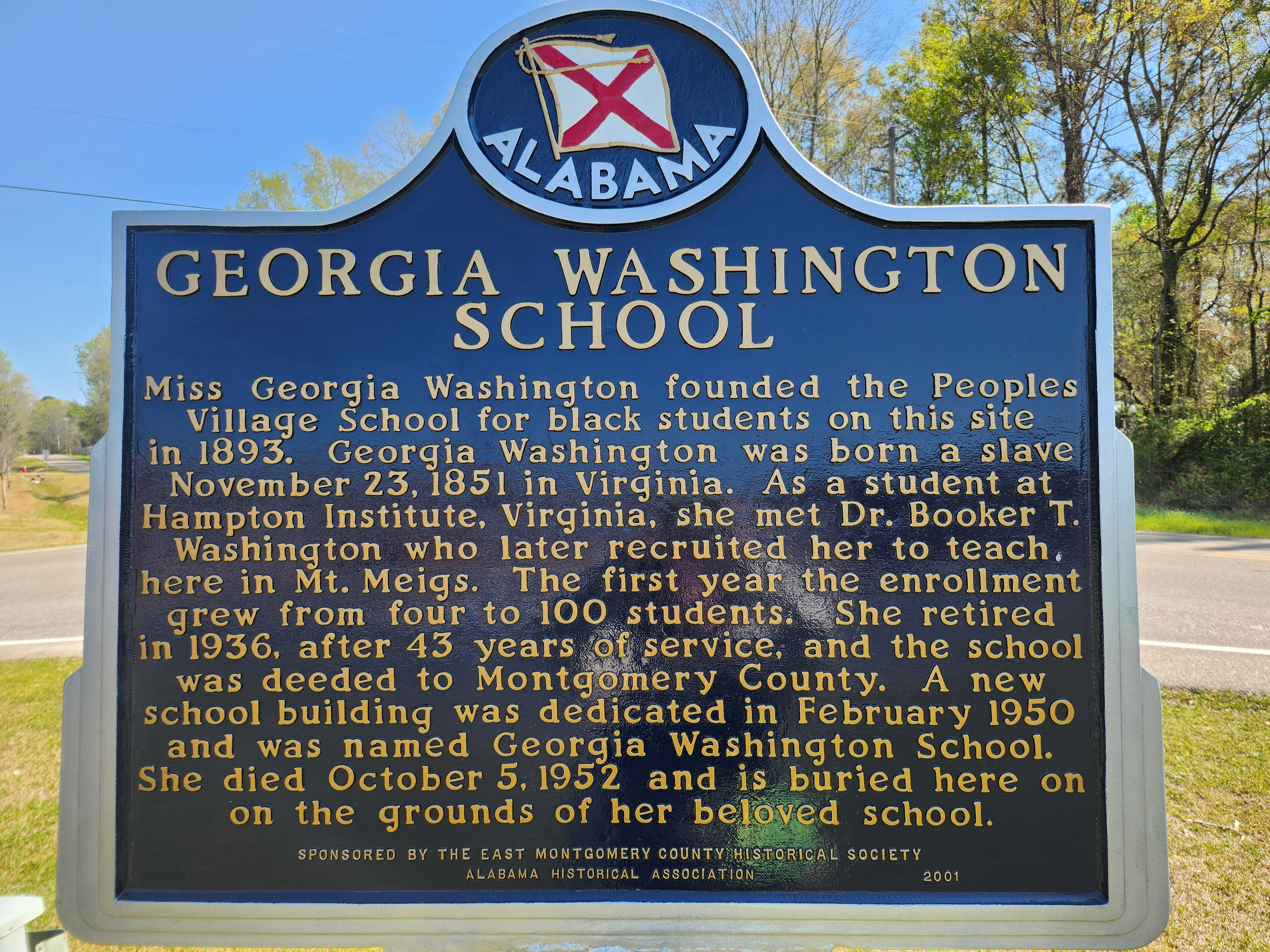
Georgia Washington School marker

By 1932, People's Village earned a reputation for excellency across the country, especially in African American publications such as the Chicago Defender. During this year, Washington wrote a letter detailing to school supporters how over 100 families owned their homes and small tracts of land, and all of the land touching school grounds was owned by African Americans. In another letter written in April of the same year, Washington wrote to supporters--many up North--for funding to combat the poverty of the Great Depression. She asked for funding to pay her teachers "the balance due on their salaries, also some long outstanding bills on the school."

Later in 1936, Washington retired from teaching after 43 years and was succeeded by former student Oscar Pinkston as principal. She deeded her school to Montgomery County, and in February 1950, a new school building--"Georgia Washington School"--was dedicated to her by the community and Montgomery County School superintendent Dr. C. M. Dannelly. The opening of Georgia Washington School was a large event that attracted students, parents, alumni, public officials, and other community members. In 1969, the Georgia Washington School became an integrated junior high school after the federal courts mandated a countrywide desegregation plan.

== Mt. Meigs land cultivation ==
The Mt. Meigs community received many lessons on farming and cultivation. It hosted the annual meeting of the Farmers' Progressive Union and meetings for the Negro Farmers' Union. A Tuskegee graduate by the name of Professor Carver would come to judge citizens' gardens and farms, awarding prizes and teaching lessons about soil preparation, cultivation, and seed planting.

In 1915, a campaign initiative was started to keep money in Montgomery County by hosting dinners in different places. Georgia Washington put her school on Route 4. Later in 1917, the Farmers' and Producers' League was developed with the guidance of Georgia Washington to create more foodstuffs for the town and a canning production initiative to help other towns in the state who are less fortunate regarding farmland. In 1916, Georgia Washington hosted a Louisiana planter at the People's Village to help the local farmers combat a boll weevil infestation on their crops.

=== Antioch Baptist Church ===
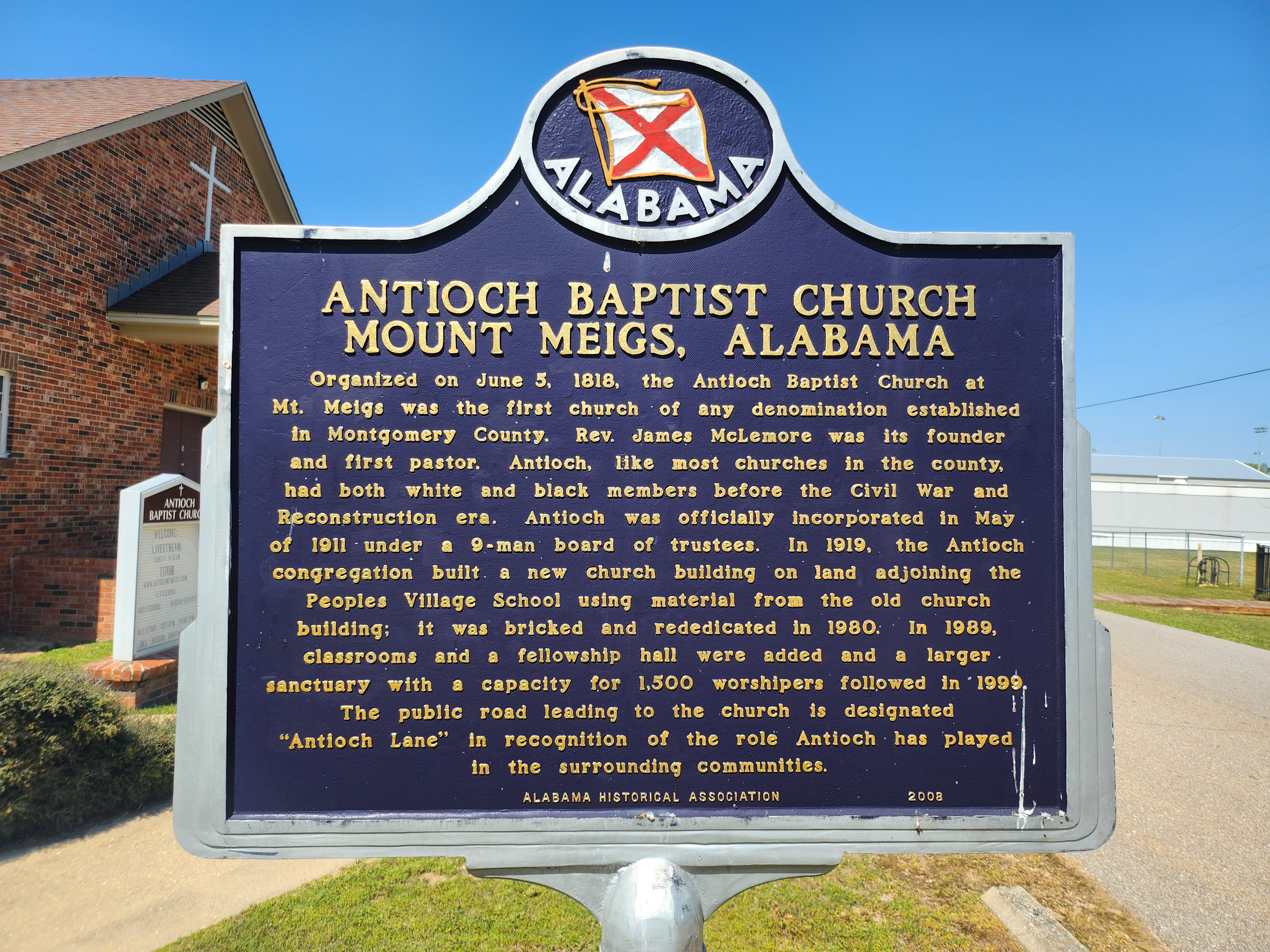
Antioch Baptist Church marker

The Antioch Baptist Church was the church Washington attended and often served as a place to host charity events. In one specific example, the Peoples Village School Red Cross Society, which held 27 members, made articles of clothing for soldiers overseas in support of the war effort in 1918.

In 1919, Georgia Washington adjoined the Antioch Baptist Church to the People's Village School. In 1937, a harsh storm blew the church off its foundations and had to be repaired. In 1980, the church was once again separated.

== People's Village in the modern day ==
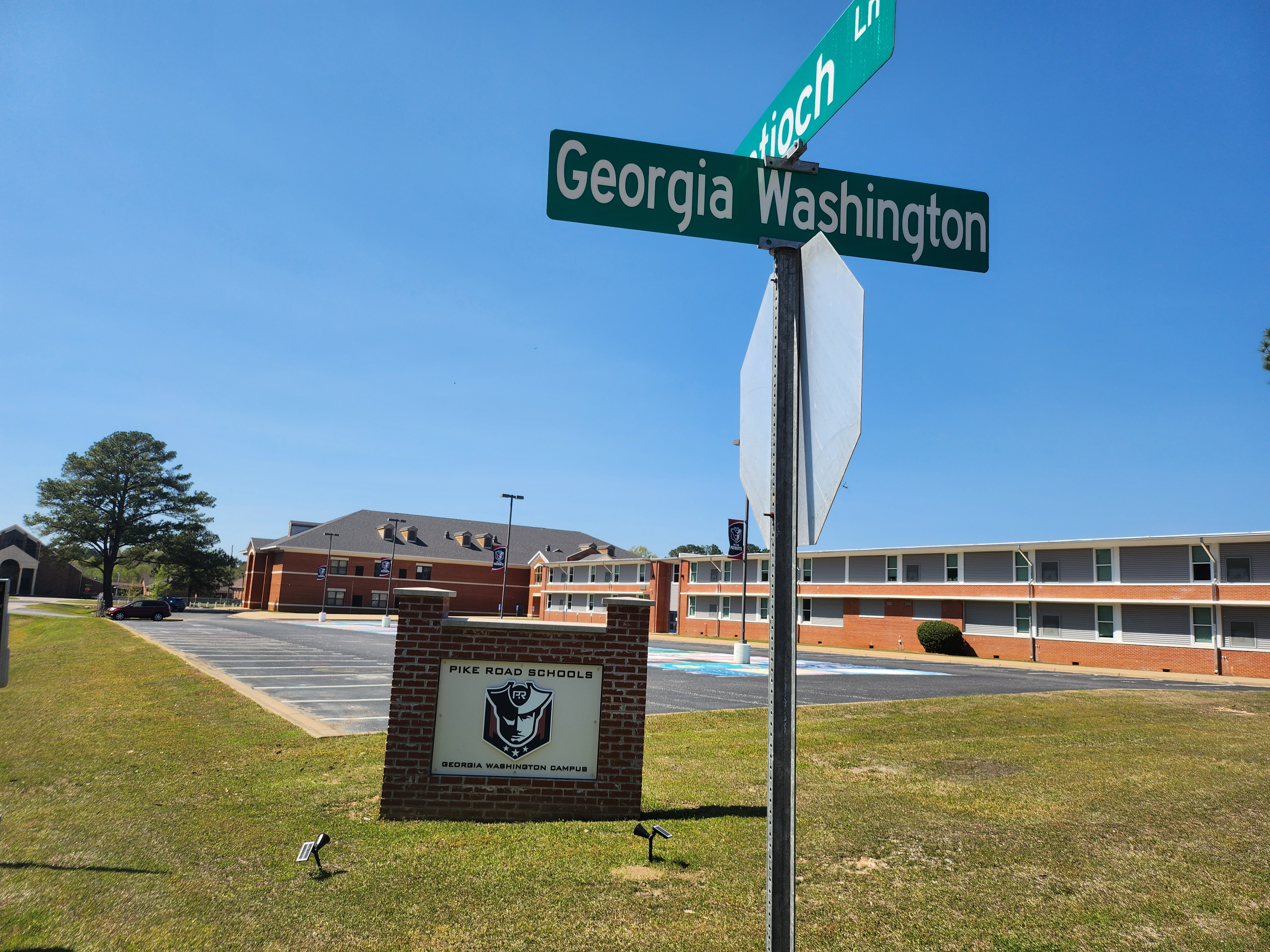
Georgia Washington road sign that sits in front of the Pike Road high school

In 1974, 600 students enrolled into Georgia Washington Middle School after the building was reestablished. This is pre-Pike Road purchasing the school from Montgomery County in 2018. A news article was created for the opening and two former students were interviewed: Alma Clark and Jack Williams. Clark recalls her time in school and her interactions with Washington as a little girl, including specific details like braiding her hair. Williams speaks to how Washington directed the teachers in the school to be passionate about education to support the children.

=== Pike Road purchase ===
In the fall of 2017, the Pike Road School District closed a deal with Montgomery County Schools to buy Georgia Washington Junior High for $9.85 million to be paid over a decade. The mayor of Pike Road, Gordon Stone, called the purchase a "win-win" for both districts, commenting on how Pike Road could avoid paying to build an entirely new high school and Montgomery County could receive funds they desperately needed. A notable inclusion in the deal was that the name "Georgia Washington" must stay and Pike Road must care for Washington's grave. The new high school was named "Pike Road High School: Georgia Washington Campus."

=== Death and grave ===
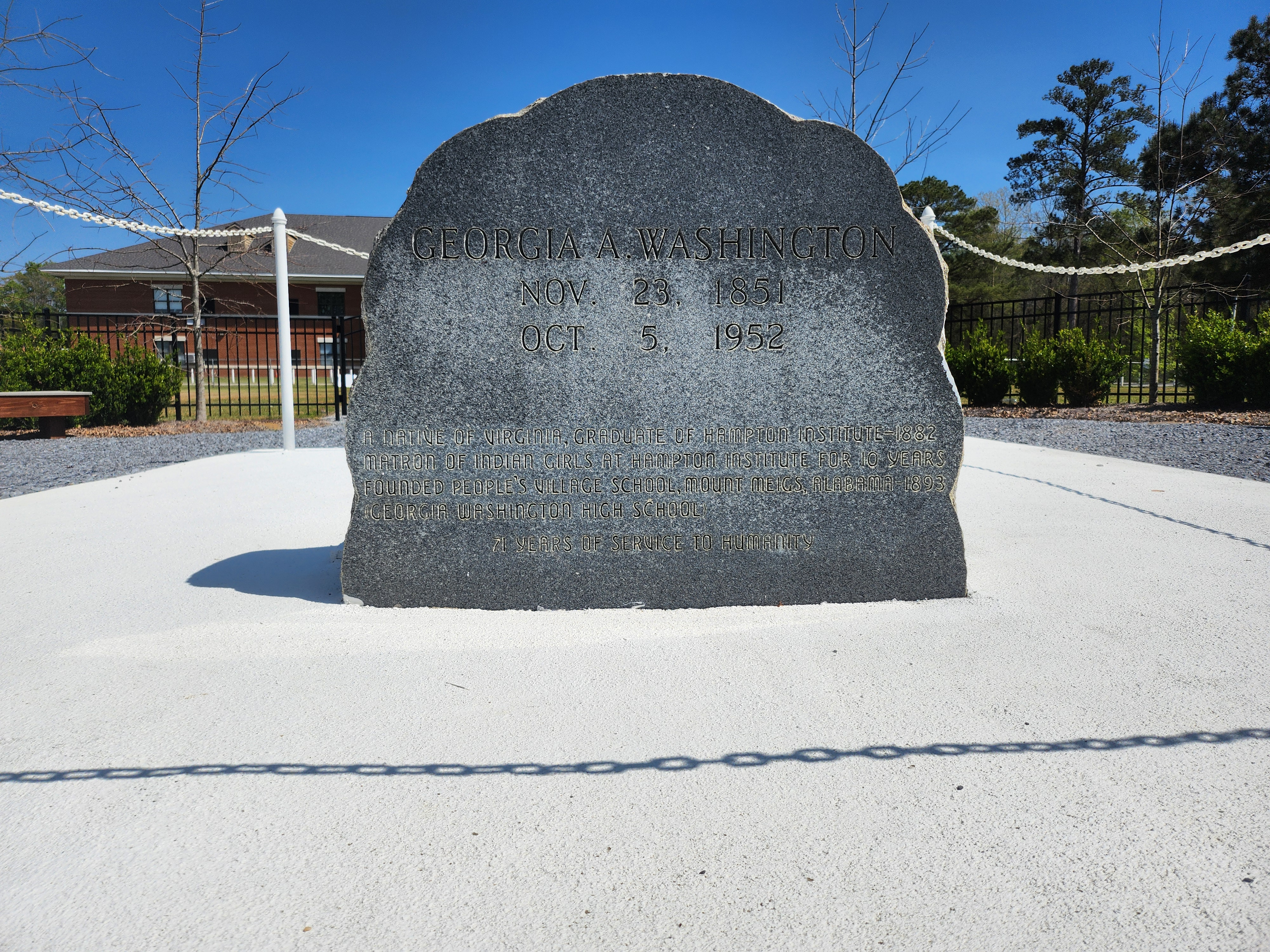
"GEORGIA A. WASHINGTON/ NOV. 23, 1851/ OCT. 5, 1952/ A NATIVE OF VIRGINIA, GRADUATE OF HAMPTON INSTITUTE-1882/ MATRON OF INDIAN GIRLS AT HAMPTON INSTITUTE FOR 10 YEARS/ FOUNDED PEOPLE'S VILLAGE SCHOOL, MOUNT MEIGS, ALABAMA-1893/ (GEORGIA WASHINGTON HIGH SCHOOL)/ 71 YEARS OF SERVICE TO HUMANITY"

Georgia Washington died on October 5, 1952, and was buried on the grounds of her school, halfway between the church she attended and the school building. Since then, the school has cared for the grave. Upon the Pike Road purchase of the school, the grave has received more attention, adding gates and a garden.

== See also ==
- African-American teachers
- History of African-American education
