= Mount Meigs Campus =

Juvenile correctional facility in Alabama, United States

Coordinates: 32°22′43″N 86°5′5″W

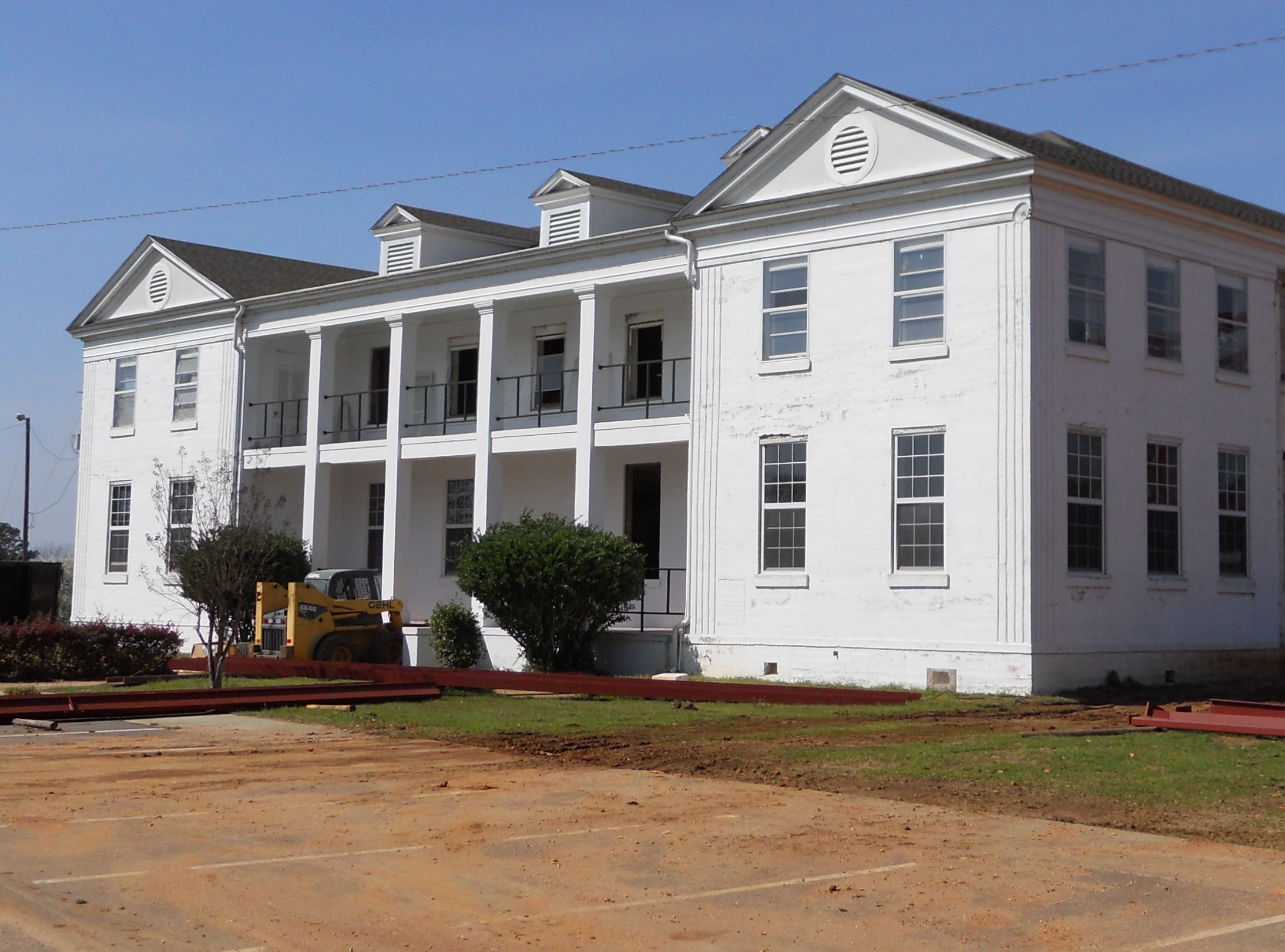
Mount Meigs Campus Administration Building (under renovation as of March 2011)

The Mount Meigs Campus is a juvenile corrections facility of the Alabama Department of Youth Services located in the Mount Meigs community, and in the city of Montgomery, Alabama; the campus serves as the agency's administrative headquarters. The 780-acre (320 ha) campus, which can house 264 boys, is next to Interstate 85 North and about 15 miles (24 km) east of Downtown Montgomery. Since 2015, the separate J. Walter Wood Treatment facility for 24 girls is also located in the Mount Meigs Campus.

== History ==
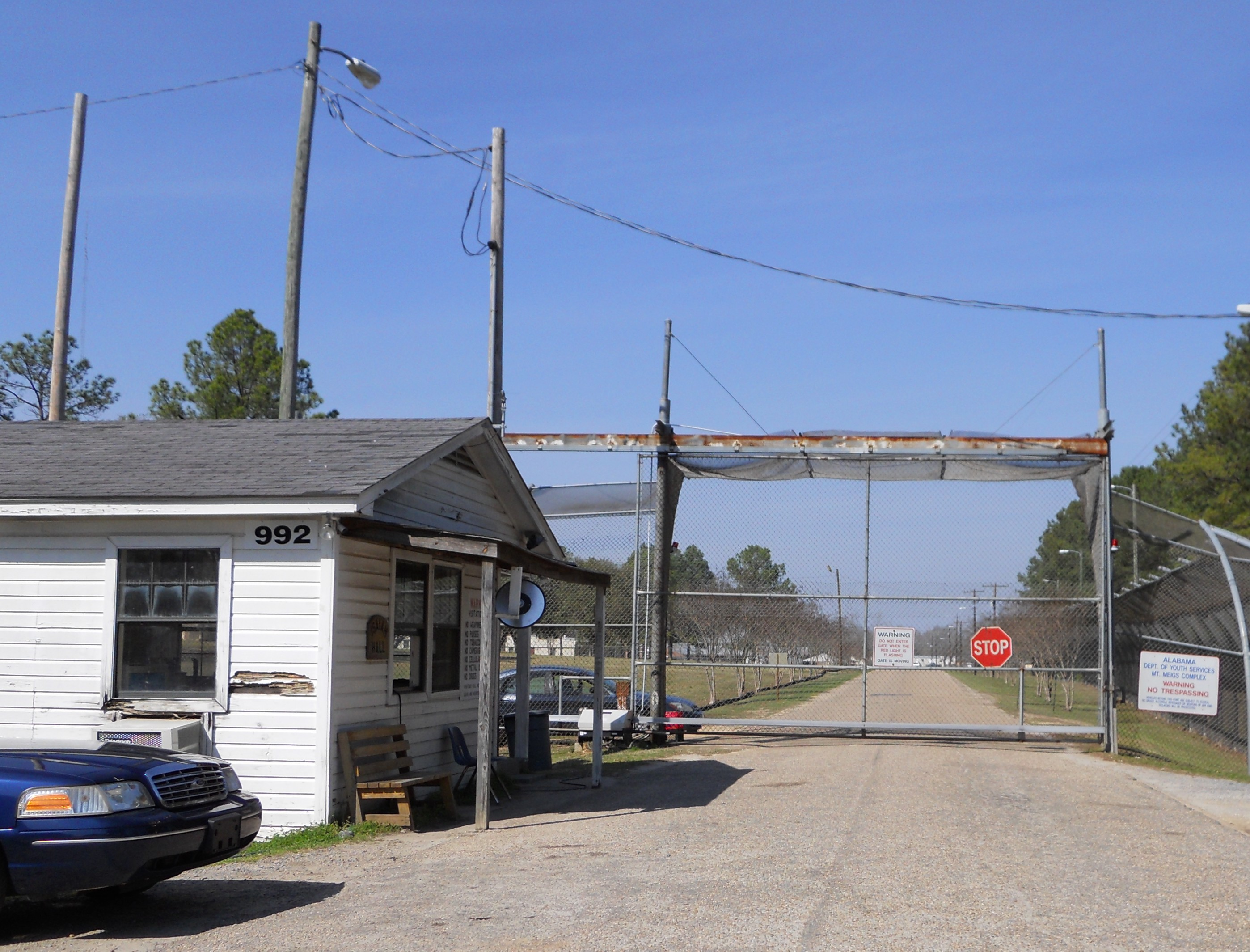
Front entrance to Mount Meigs Campus

In 1888, Cornelia Bowen was recommended by Booker T. Washington to establish a school for boys and girls in the Mount Meigs area. Cornelia Bowen graduated from the Tuskegee Institute in 1885, a member of the first graduating class, and led the Mount Meigs Colored Institute until her death in 1934. In 1908, the State Federation of Colored Women's Clubs, of which Bowen was president, established a second school on the grounds of the institute. After much lobbying of Congress, in 1911, the women were successful in convincing the state to take over the operation of the reformatory.

In 1911, the school became the Alabama Reform School for Juvenile Negro Law-Breakers. The name was changed to the Alabama Industrial School for Negro Children in 1947, and to the Alabama Industrial School in 1970. The facility has been variously described as a "slave camp", "plantation", "prison for teens", and "penal colony for children".

On March 27, 1915, the Hampton Institute Camera Club, known for its illustrations of Paul Laurence Dunbar's poetry, staged a photo sale for the benefit of the Mt. Meigs school. The sale raised funds for four five-dollar scholarships for day students. A Hampton graduate managed the Mt. Meigs school, which was considered "an outgrowth" of Hampton.

Famous residents included baseball legend Leroy Satchel Paige, from 1918 to 1923.

Earlier in its life, its capacity was 312 boys.

There was controversy, in April 2008, when parent Glenn Herrmann said authorities surrounded his Randolph County home and accused him of helping his son break free at the Mount Meigs Campus.

In 2012, the infamous Chalkville Campus facility for girls aged 12 to 18 was destroyed by a tornado and in 2015 the new J. Walter Wood Treatment facility for them was inaugurated at the Mount Meigs campus.

== See also ==
- Alabama Department of Youth Services School District
