= American juvenile justice system =

Aspect of American justice system

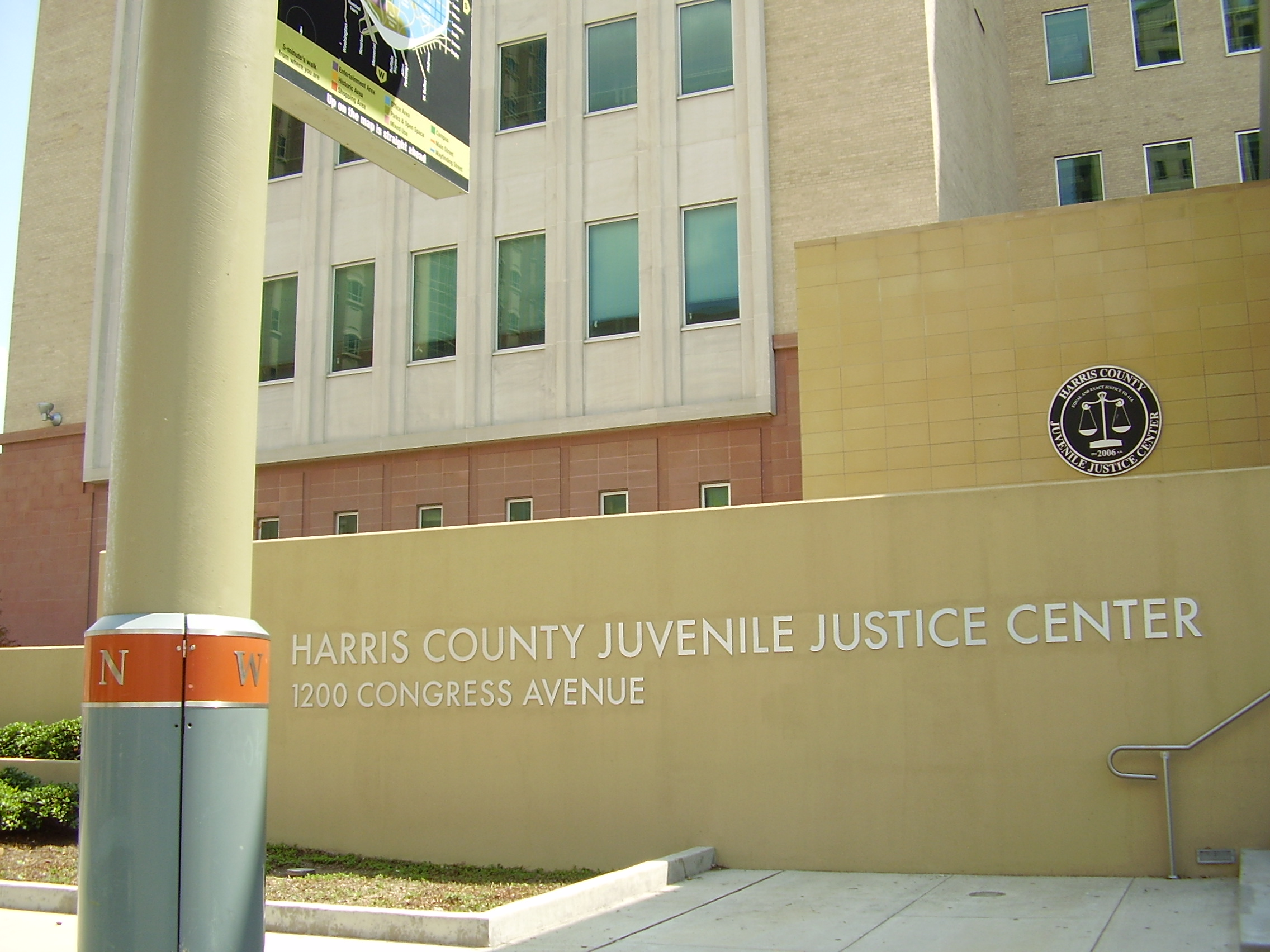
Harris County Juvenile Justice Center

The American juvenile justice system is the primary system used to handle minors who are convicted of criminal offenses. The system is composed of a federal and many separate state, territorial, and local jurisdictions, with states and the federal government sharing sovereign police power under the common authority of the United States Constitution. The juvenile justice system intervenes in delinquent behavior through police, court, and correctional involvement, with the goal of rehabilitation. Youth and their guardians can face a variety of consequences including probation, community service, youth court, youth incarceration and alternative schooling. The juvenile justice system, similar to the adult system, operates from a belief that intervening early in delinquent behavior will deter adolescents from engaging in criminal behavior as adults.

== History and background ==
=== Pre-1900 ===
Juvenile delinquency punishments trace back to the Middle Ages when crimes were severely punished by the Church. Throughout the 17th and 18th centuries, few legal differences existed between children and adults. Children as young as six and seven years were considered productive members of the family and their labor contributed to family income. In court, children as young as seven were treated as adults and could receive the death penalty. Early debates questioned whether there should be a separate legal system for punishing juveniles, or if juveniles should be sentenced in the same manner as adults

With the changing demographic, social, and economic context of the 19th century resulting largely from industrialization, "the social construction of childhood...as a period of dependency and exclusion from the adult world" was institutionalized. This century saw the opening of the first programs targeting juvenile delinquency. Barry Krisberg and James F. Austin note that the first ever institution dedicated to juvenile delinquency was the New York House of Refuge in 1825. Other programs, described by Finley, included: "houses of refuge", which emphasized moral rehabilitation; "reform schools", which had widespread reputations for mistreatment of the children living there; and "child saving organizations", social charity agencies dedicated to reforming poor and delinquent children. These 'child-saving efforts' were early attempts at differentiating between delinquents and abandoned youth.

Prior to this ideological shift, the application of parens patriae was restricted to protecting the interests of children, deciding guardianship and commitment of the mentally ill. In the 1839 Pennsylvania landmark case, Ex parte Crouse, the court allowed use of parens patriae to detain young people for non-criminal acts in the name of rehabilitation. Since these decisions were carried out "in the best interest of the child," the due process protections afforded adult criminals were not extended to juveniles.

=== Early 1900s ===
The nation's first juvenile court was formed in Illinois in 1899 and provided a legal distinction between juvenile abandonment and crime. The law that established the court, the Illinois Juvenile Court Law of 1899, was created largely because of the advocacy of women such as Jane Addams, Louise DeKoven Bowen, Lucy Flowers and Julia Lathrop, who were members of the influential Chicago Woman's Club. The Chicago court opened on July 1, 1899 with Judge Tuthill presiding, along with several members of the Chicago Woman's Club who acted as advisors about the juvenile offender's backgrounds. Establishing a juvenile court helped reframe cultural and legal interpretations of "the best interests of the child." The underlying assumption of the original juvenile system, and one that continues to prevail, was that juveniles were generally more amenable to rehabilitation than adult criminals. This new application of parens patriae and the development of a separate juvenile court formed the foundation for the modern juvenile justice system.

An often overlooked aspect of history is the role of the juvenile court movement in solidifying religious involvement in the child welfare context and child placement services. The circumstances leading to the enactment of the Illinois Juvenile Court Law of 1899 was the product of powerful lobbying and careful legislative drafting. After Illinois passed a constitutional amendment that prohibited the allocation of public funds to any church or sectarian purpose, supporters of faith-based orphanages—who relied heavily on public funding—retained the aid of jurists such as Hastings Hart to draft a proposed juvenile court law that comports with the state’s existing institutional approach to child welfare. The final version of the law incorporated "strategic adjustments" in favor of institutions over foster care. The approved draft did not provide any funding for foster care, restricted inspection of institutions receiving public funding, and protected children’s religious identities by permitting courts to consider placing children “in the care and custody of some individual holding the same religious belief as the parents of said child, or with some association which is controlled by persons of like religious faith of the parents of the said child.” Many states soon adopted the language of the Illinois law in verbatim, spreading the establishment of juvenile courts around the nation. Juvenile courts soon became a powerful institutional mechanism that solidified the involvement of private, usually religious, orphanages in child placement services.

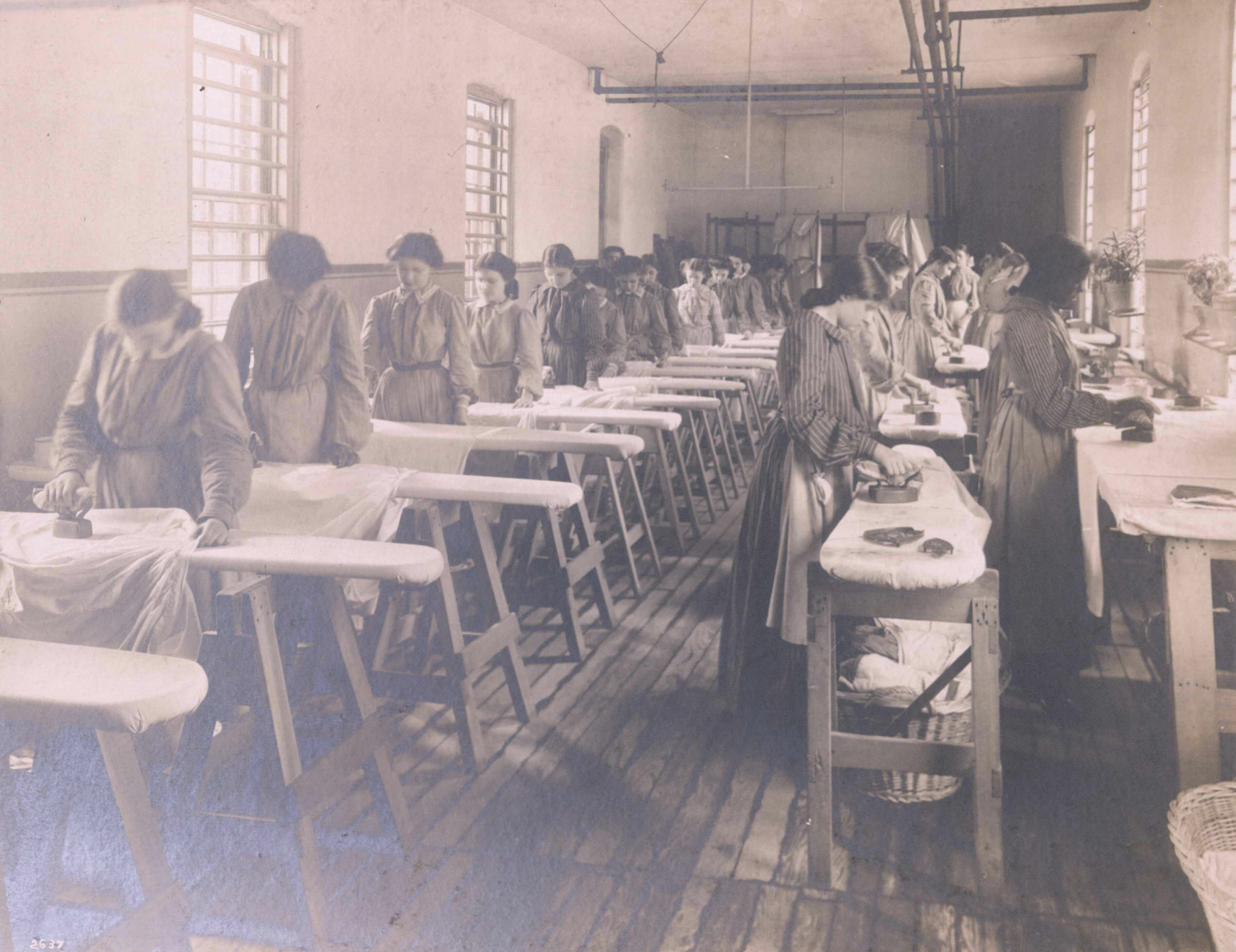
Inmates of the Indiana Industrial School for Girls ironing fabrics, c. 1907

The creation of the juvenile justice system in Chicago coincided with the migration of southern black families to the North. A combination of factors like lack of parental supervision and extreme poverty left black children vulnerable.

After states began passing compulsory education laws in the second half of the nineteenth century, repeated acts of truancy could land students in state juvenile courts. In enforcing the truancy laws, Progressive Era judges and educators relied on teachers' report cards to monitor the behavior of probationers. Report cards often categorized truants as disobedient and unyielding. In one case a 13 year old Kentuckian was accused of "habitual truancy" by the principal of his school, which would have been a violation of compulsory education laws, but the principal herself admitted that his attendance was perfect and that she had filed a petition for him to be sent to a Parental School because his parents were not giving him adequate care and "something should be done to keep him off the streets and away from bad company".

=== 1960s to 1980s ===
The debate about morality and effectiveness surrounded juvenile courts until the 1950s. The 1960s through the 1980s saw a rise in attention to and speculation about juvenile delinquency, as well as concern about the court system as a social issue. This era was characterized by distinctly harsh punishments for youths. There was also a new focus on providing minors with due process and legal counsel in court. Criticism in this era focused on racial discrimination, gender disparities, and discrimination towards children with mental health problems or learning disabilities. While still recommending harsher punishments for serious crimes, "community-based programs, diversion, and deinstitutionalization became the banners of juvenile justice policy in the 1970's". However, these alternative approaches were short lived. The rising crime rates of the 1960s and media misrepresentation of this crime throughout the 1970s and 80s, paved the way for Reagan's War on Drugs and subsequent "tough-on-crime" policies. Heightened fears of a 'youth problem' "revealed white, middle- and upper-class anxieties about growing social unrest and the potential volatility stemming from social and economic inequality". Public perception of juvenile deviance was such that at the 1999 Juvenile Justice Hearings, Bill McCollum claimed "simply and sadly put: Today in America no population poses a larger threat to public safety than juvenile offenders". In the late 1980s, the United States experienced a large increase in crime, and juvenile crime was brought into public view (Juvenile delinquency in the United States). Americans feared a "juvenile super-predator", and this fear was met by the government with harsher policies for juvenile crime.

=== 1990s to present day ===
In the 1990s, juvenile crime – especially violent crime – decreased, although policies remained the same. Schools and politicians adopted zero-tolerance policies with regard to crime and argued that rehabilitative approaches were less effective than strict punishment. The increased ease in trying juveniles as adults became a defining feature of "tough-on-crime" policies in the 1990s. As Loyola law professor Sacha Coupet argues, "[o]ne way in which "get tough" advocates have supported a merger between the adult criminal and juvenile systems is by expanding the scope of transfer provisions or waivers that bring children under the jurisdiction of the adult criminal system". Some states moved specific classes of crimes from the juvenile court to adult criminal court while others gave this power to judges or prosecutors on a case-by-case basis. Still, others require the courts to treat offending youth like adults but within the juvenile system. In some states, adjudicated offenders face mandatory sentences. By 1997, all but three states had passed a combination of laws that eased the use of transfer provisions, provided courts with expanded sentencing options, and removed the confidentiality tradition of the juvenile court. Juvenile courts were transformed to more easily allow for prosecution of juveniles as adults at the same time the adult system was re-defining which acts constituted a "serious crime." The "three strikes laws" that began in 1993 fundamentally altered the criminal offenses that resulted in detention, imprisonment, and even a life sentence, for both youth and adults. "Three strikes laws" were not specific to juvenile offenders, but they were enacted during a period when the lines between juvenile and adult courts were becoming increasingly blurred. The War on Drugs and "tough-on-crime" policies like Three Strikes resulted in an explosion in the number of incarcerated individuals.

Implementation of the Gun-Free School Act (GFSA) in 1994 is one example of a "tough on crime" policy that has contributed to increased numbers of young people being arrested and detained. It was intended to prosecute young offenders for serious crimes like gun possession on school property, but many states interpreted this law to include less dangerous weapons and drug possession. Many schools even interpreted GFSA to include "infractions that pose no safety concern, such as 'disobeying [school] rules, 'insubordination,' and 'disruption". These offenses can now warrant suspension, expulsion and involvement with juvenile justice courts. Schools have become the primary stage for juvenile arrest and the charges brought against them and punishments they face are increasing in severity. Today this is frequently referred to as the school-to-prison pipeline.

== Demographics ==
Demographic information for youth involved in the Juvenile Justice system is somewhat difficult to collect, as most data is collected at state, county, and city levels. Although the office of Juvenile Justice and Delinquency Prevention publishes national numbers that breakdown the racial make-up of youth involved in the juvenile justice system, this data provides an incomplete picture, as it excludes Hispanic youth in its demographic calculations.

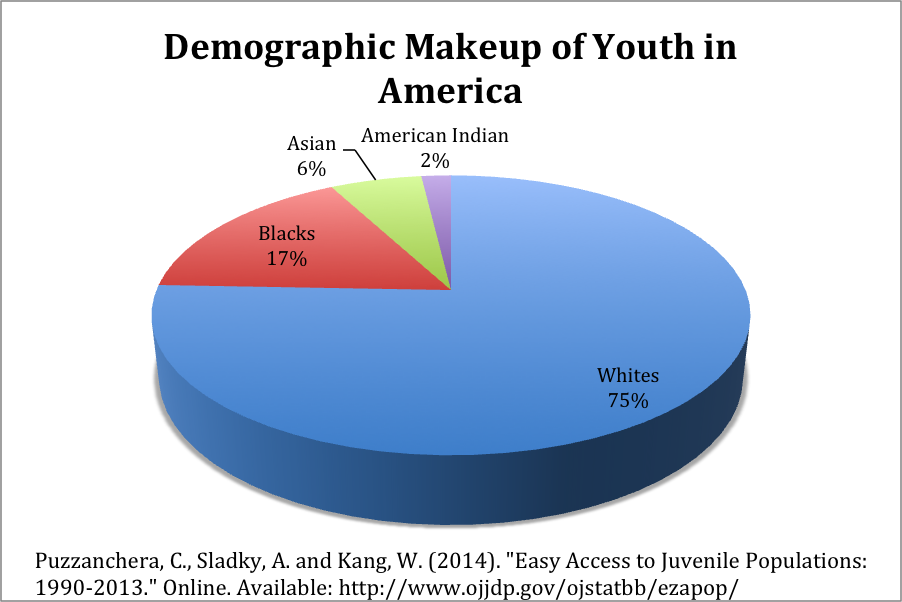
A demographic breakdown of youth in the United States

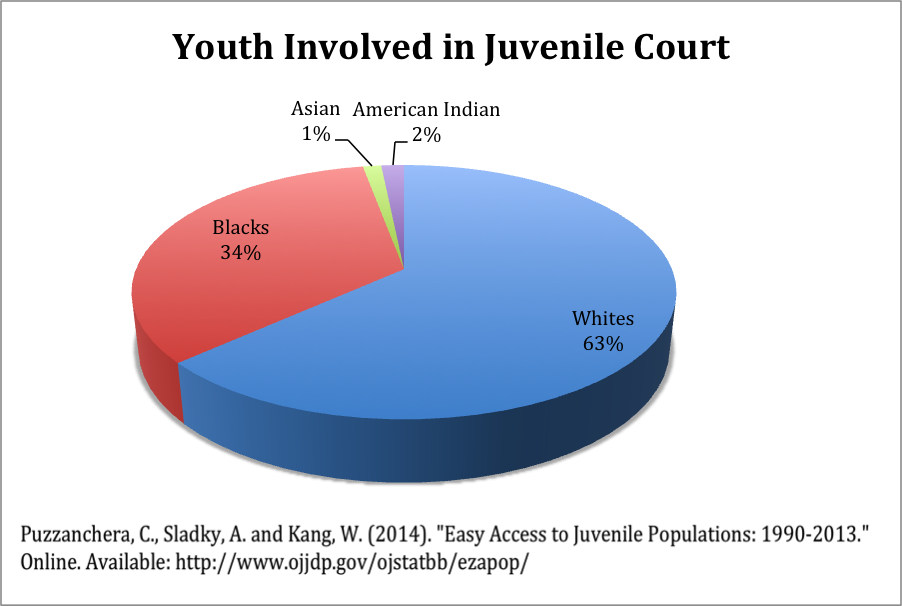
A demographic breakdown of youth involved in juvenile court in the United States

According to the Office of Juvenile Justice and Delinquency Prevention, in 2011 there were a total of 1,236,200 cases handled by the juvenile courts. 891,100 cases dealt with males, compared with 345,100 for females. The most prominent age group represented in the courts is 13 to 15 years, which make up 552,000 of the total cases. 410,900 of the cases involved Black adolescents, which represents about one-third of the total court cases.

The number of cases handled by the juvenile courts in the United States was 1,159,000 in 1985, and increased steadily until 1998, reaching a high point of 1,872,700. After this point, the number of cases steadily declined until 2011.

In the 1,236,200 cases settled in 2011, 60% of the juveniles had a previous background of criminal history in their families and 96% of the juveniles had substance abuse problems, often related to parental/guardian substance abuse. In 1999, juveniles accounted for 16% of all violent crime arrests, and 32% of all property crime. They also accounted for 54% of all arson arrests, 42% of vandalism arrests, 31% of larceny-theft arrests, and 33% of burglary arrests.

Racial discrepancies

Since 1995, the rate of confinement has dropped by 41%, and the rate has decreased among all major racial groups in the US. However, disparities by race remain apparent: in 2010, 225 youths per 100,000 were in confinement. When separated by race, there were 605 African-Americans, 127 Non-Hispanic Whites, 229 Hispanics, 367 Native Americans, and 47 Asian/Pacific Islanders in confinement per 100,000. African-Americans are close to five times more likely to be confined than white youths, while Latino and Native Americans are two to three times more likely to be confined than white youths. Racial disparities in confinement are relatively constant across states.

According to the Office of Juvenile Justice and Delinquency Prevention, females constitute 14% of juveniles in residential placement in 2011. Of these females, 61% belong to racial minority groups.

The Annie E. Casey Foundation provides additional information about the demographics of the juvenile justice system.

=== Juveniles in residential placement ===
Residential placement refers to any facility in which an adolescent remains on-site 24 hours a day. These facilities include youth detention centers, group homes, shelters, correctional facilities, or reform schools. According to census data of Juveniles in residential placement and the Annie E. Casey Foundation, the number of youths in juvenile detention centers in the United States has declined in the past two decades. The number of adolescents incarcerated peaked in 1995, with 107,637 in confinement in a single day. In contrast, there were fewer than 62,000 adolescents in residential placement in October 2011. Juvenile offenders are placed either in public facilities operated by the State or local government, or private, for-profit facilities operated by separate corporations and organizations. Private facilities are smaller than public facilities. Half of all juvenile placement facilities in the US are privately operated, and these facilities hold nearly one-third of juvenile offenders.

Since 1997, 44 states and the District of Columbia have experienced a decrease in incarceration of adolescents. As of 2010, only 1 in 4 juveniles in confinement were incarcerated as a result of a violent crime (homicide, robbery, sexual assault, aggravated assault). Additionally, 40% of juvenile delinquency cases and detentions are a result of offenses that are not considered threats to public safety. These include underage possession of alcohol, truancy, drug possession, low-level property offenses, and probation violations. The most common age of offenders was 17 years old, with 17,500 in placement in 2011. Juveniles aged 12 and under accounted for 1% of all youth in placement.

== Criticisms ==
The current debate on juvenile justice reform in the United States focuses on the root of racial and economic discrepancies in the incarcerated youth population. Residual fear from "get-tough" policies implement harsher practices in schools that perpetuate an unhealthy cycle. The most common is the implementation of zero tolerance policies which have increased the numbers of young people being removed from classrooms, often for minor infractions. Low-income youth, youth of color and youth with learning and cognitive disabilities are over-represented in the justice system and disproportionately targeted by zero tolerance policies. Collectively this creates the school-to-prison pipeline - a phenomenon that contributes to more students falling behind, dropping out and eventually being funneled into the juvenile justice system.

Much of the criticism about the American juvenile justice system revolves around its effectiveness in rehabilitating juvenile delinquents. Research on juvenile incarceration and prosecution indicates that criminal activity is influenced by positive and negative life transitions regarding the completion of education, entering the workforce, and marrying and beginning families. According to certain developmental theories, adolescents who are involved in the court system are more likely to experience disruption in their life transitions, leading them to engage in delinquent behavior as adults.

Lois M. Davis et al. argue that adolescents are affected by a juvenile system that does not have effective public policies. Currently the juvenile system has failed to ensure that all youth in the system with learning disabilities or mental health issues, and from lower-class individuals and racial minorities are provided with the benefits for a productive life once out of the system. In 2013 30% of youth in system have a learning disability and nearly 50% test below grade level. They argue that the juvenile justice system should be restructured to more effectively lower the chances of future crime among youth, and advocate for increased educational programs for incarcerated youth as the most important method to reduce recidivism.

There are many drug addicts that are also failed with the benefits for a productive life once out of the system. They are convicted too harshly and do not get the privilege to truly learn and get better enough to not crave drugs. "According to the National Center on Addiction and Substance Abuse, 65% of the U.S. prison population meets the medical criteria for drug or alcohol use disorders, but less than 11% receive treatment for those illnesses." Drug rehab has proven to be significantly more beneficial than jail time to those with drug charges. Additionally, 1 in 28 kids has a parent in prison. There is a reason why much of the criticism about the American juvenile justice system revolves around its effectiveness in rehabilitating juvenile delinquents.

A 2015 report from The Council of State Governments Justice Center showed only 13 states provide incarcerated youth with the same educational services as the general student population in the United States. The report recommended juvenile detention facilities should be held to the same academic standards as other public schools.

== Proposed reforms ==
Many scholars stress the importance of reforming the juvenile justice system to increase its effectiveness and avoid discrimination. Finley argues for early intervention in juvenile delinquency, and advocates for the development of programs that are more centered on rehabilitation rather than punishment. James C. Howell et al. argue that zero tolerance policies overwhelm the juvenile justice system with low risk offenders and should be eliminated. They also argue that the most effective ways to reform the juvenile justice system would be to reduce the overrepresentation of minorities and eliminate the transfer of juveniles to the criminal justice system. Zimring and Tannenhaus also discuss the future of the juvenile justice system in the United States. They argue that educational reentry programs should be developed and given high importance alongside policies of dropout prevention. Reentry programs focus on providing care and support to juveniles after being released from detention facilities, and encouraging family support to help adolescents during this adjustment period. They also argue for the elimination of juvenile sex offender registration requirements, and the reform of criminal record information for juvenile offenders.

Some popular suggested reforms to juvenile detention programs include changing policies regarding incarceration and funding. One recommendation from the Annie E. Casey Foundation is restricting the offenses that are punishable by incarceration, so that only youth who present a threat to public safety are confined. Other suggestions include investing in alternatives to incarceration, changing economic incentives that favor incarceration, and establishing smaller, more humane and treatment-oriented detention centers for the small number who are confined.

=== Positive youth development and the juvenile justice system ===
Positive youth development (PYD) encompasses the intentional efforts of other youth, adults, communities, government agencies and schools to provide opportunities for youth to enhance their interests, skills, and abilities.

The justice system offers specific services to youth facing significant mental health and substance use challenges, but the majority of youth do not qualify for these targeted programs and interventions. Butts, et al. suggest that the integration of positive youth development into the juvenile justice system would benefit youth charged with nonviolent, less serious offenses.

Widespread implementation of PYD approaches in the juvenile justice system faces many challenges. Philosophically however, the PYD framework resembles the progressive era ideals that informed the creation of the first juvenile court. As Butts, Mayer and Ruther describe, "The concepts underlying PYD resemble those that led to the founding of the american juvenile justice system more than a century ago. [...] Organizers of the first juvenile courts saw the solution to delinquency in better schools, community organizations, public health measures, and family supports. They believed an improved social environmental would encourage youth to embrace pro-social norms."

Integration of PYD into the juvenile justice system is informed by social learning theory and social control theory. Taken together, these theories suggest that "youth are less attracted to criminal behavior when they are involved with others, learning useful skills, being rewarded for using those skills, enjoying strong relationships and forming attachments, and earning the respect of their communities". This is in stark contrast to the theories of deterrence and retributive justice espoused by the current justice system.

=== Youth court ===
Youth courts are programs in which youth sentence their peers for minor delinquent and status offenses and other problem behaviors. The program philosophy is to hold youth responsible for problem behavior, educate youth about the legal and judicial systems, and empower youth to be active in solving problems in their community. Youth courts function to determine fair and restorative sentences or dispositions for the youth respondent. Youth court programs can be administered by juvenile courts, juvenile probation departments, law enforcement, private nonprofit organizations, and schools. Youth court programs operate under four primary models: Adult Judge, Youth Judge, Peer Jury, and Youth Tribunal Models. Under the adult judge model, an adult volunteer serves as the judge while youth volunteers serve as prosecuting and defense attorneys, jurors, clerks, and bailiffs. Under the youth judge model, youth volunteers fill all roles, including judge. Under a peer jury model, youth jurors question the respondents and make sentencing determinations. Under a youth tribunal model, youth serve as prosecuting and defense attorneys, and present their cases to a panel of youth judges, who then make a sentencing determination. To date, there are no comprehensive national guidelines for youth courts, but rather, courts operate under and are tailored to their local jurisdictions. To date, there are more than 675 youth courts in the United States.

East Palo Alto and Boston have both implemented youth courts. The East Palo Alto youth court is based on restorative justice principles. Eligible youth must admit the facts of the case, after which youth attorneys explain the facts of the case to a youth jury. In Boston, youth court is available to first time, low level offenders. It is based on a restorative justice framework.

=== Restorative justice ===
Restorative justice is an approach to justice that focuses on the needs of the victims and the offenders, and the involved community, rather than punishing the offender. Victims and offenders both take an active role in the process, with the latter being encouraged to take responsibility for their actions. Doing so is an attempt by offenders to repair the harm they've done and also provides help for the offender in order to prevent future offenses. Restorative justice is based on a theory of justice that views crime to be an offense against an individual and/or a community, versus the state. Programs that promote dialogue between victim and offender demonstrate the highest rates of victim satisfaction and offender accountability.

Restorative justice practices have been implemented in schools that experience higher rates of violence or crime. This can catch the juvenile before they're involved in the justice system and can change discipline into a learning opportunity. It encourages accountability, supportive climates, appropriate listening and responding and contributes to a development of empathy for the offender. The difference between student exclusion and restorative approaches is shown through not only low recidivism, but school climates. With restorative approaches focusing on relationships, it prioritizes interpersonal connections which creates an overall better community. The underlying thesis of restorative practices is that human beings are happier, more cooperative and productive, and more likely to make positive changes in their behavior when those in positions of authority do things with them, rather than to or for them.

=== Raise the age ===
Many advocates argue that the juvenile system should extend to include young adults 18 or older (the age that most systems use as a cut-off). Research in neurobiology and developmental psychology show that young adults' brains do not finish developing until their mid-20s, well beyond the age of criminal responsibility in most states. Other non-criminal justice systems acknowledge these differences between adults and young people with laws about drinking alcohol, smoking cigarettes, etc.

Georgia, Texas and Wisconsin remain the only states to prosecute all youth as adults when they turn 17 years of age. Connecticut Governor, Dannel Malloy proposed in 2016 raising the age in his state to 20.

== See also ==
- Juvenile Justice and Delinquency Prevention Act
- Victimology
- Youth incarceration in the United States
- History of childhood in the United States
