= Alabama Department of Youth Services School District =

School district in Alabama

Location
- Mount Meigs; Montgomery County; Alabama United States

Other information
- Website: dys.alabama.gov

The Alabama Department of Youth Services School District is the school district of the Alabama Department of Youth Services, located in Mount Meigs, Alabama. Dr. John Stewart is the superintendent.
