= Alabama Department of Youth Services =

Agency of the U.S. state of Alabama

Alabama Department of Youth Services (DYS)
Agency overview
- Type: State agency
- Jurisdiction: State of Alabama
- Headquarters: Mount Meigs Campus, Mount Meigs, Montgomery County; and Montgomery
- Child agency: Alabama Department of Youth Services School District

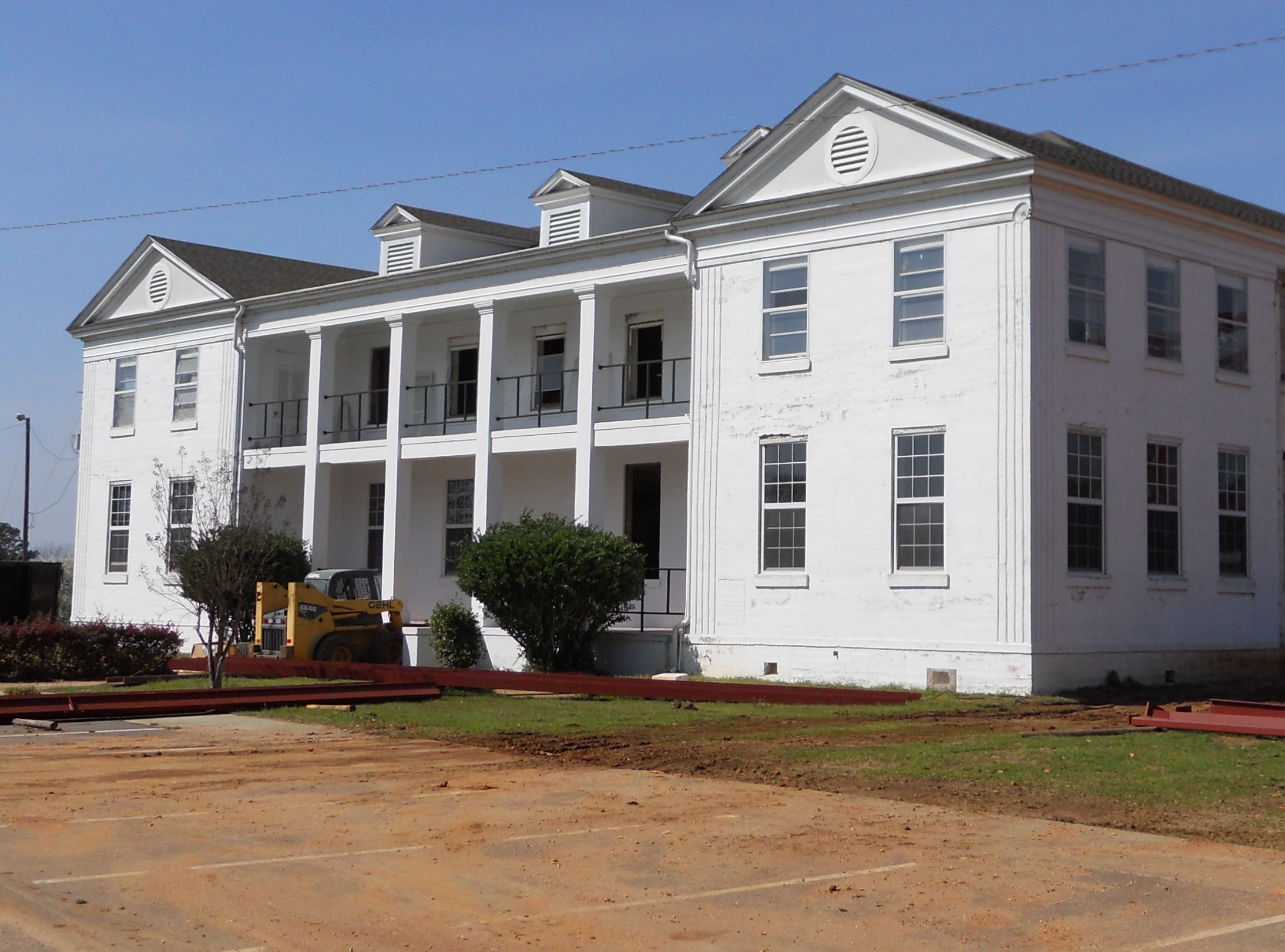
Mount Meigs Campus Administration Building (under renovation as of March 2011)

The Alabama Department of Youth Services (DYS) is a state agency of Alabama, headquartered on the grounds of the Mount Meigs Campus in Mount Meigs, and in Montgomery. The department operates juvenile correctional facilities.

The Alabama Department of Youth Services School District provides educational services to juveniles in DYS schools.

== Facilities ==
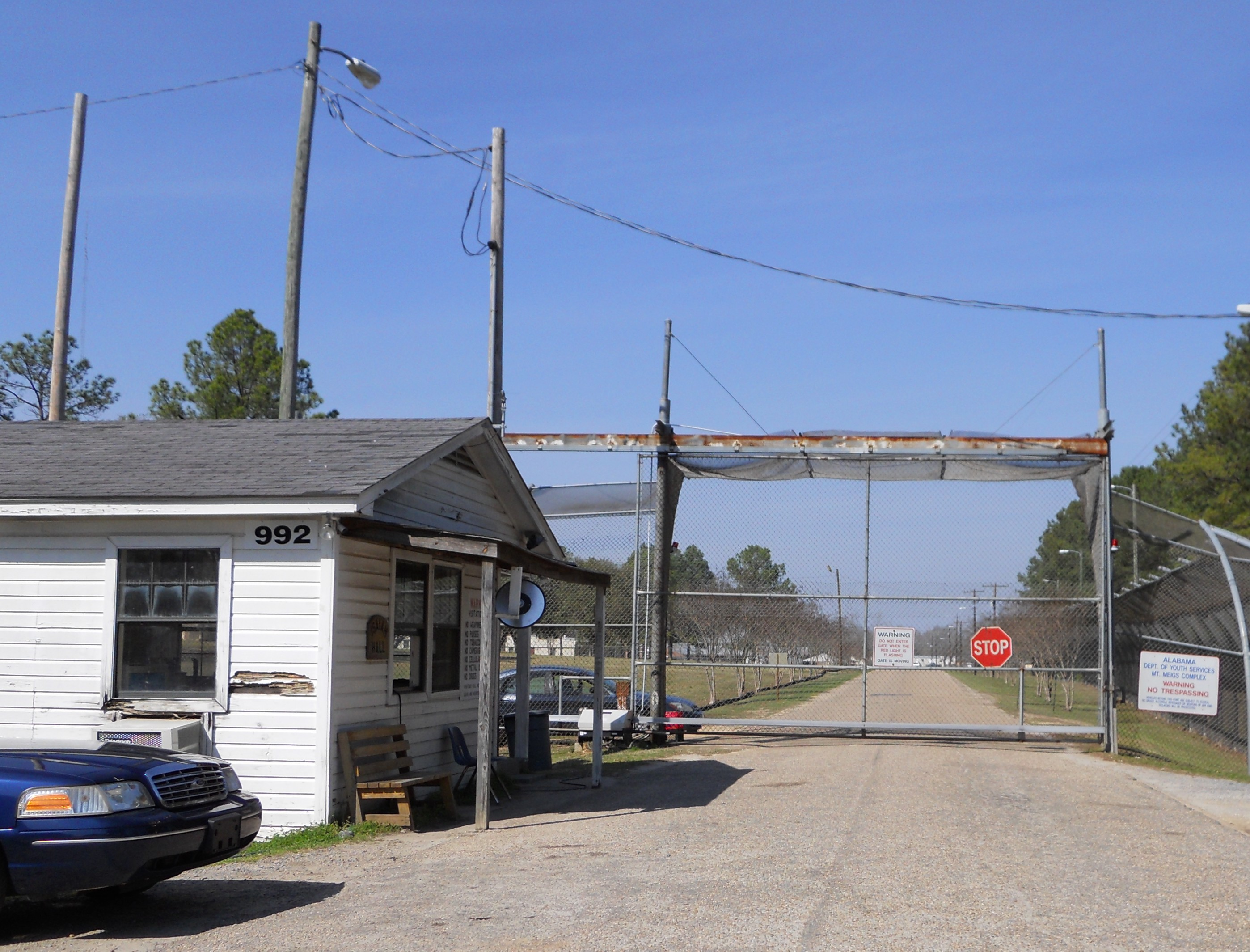
Mount Meigs Campus

Facilities directly operated by DYS include:

- Autauga Campus (unincorporated Autauga County, near Prattville)
- Mobile Group Home (Mobile)
- Mount Meigs Campus (Mount Meigs, unincorporated Montgomery County, near Montgomery), including since 2015:
  - J. Walter Wood Treatment facility for girls.
- Thomasville Campus (unincorporated Clarke County)
- VACCA Campus (Roebuck, Birmingham)

Closed

- Chalkville Campus (unincorporated Jefferson County, near Birmingham), for girls aged 12–18. Closed
  - It ended operations after a tornado in January 2012.
