= Mount Meigs, Alabama =

- Unincorporated community
- Location within Alabama Location within the United States
- Coordinates: 32°21′46″N 86°6′7″W
- Country: United States
- State: Alabama
- County: Montgomery
- Time zone: UTC-6 (Central (CST))
  - Summer (DST): UTC-5 (CDT)

Mount Meigs (also Evansville or Mount Pleasant) is an unincorporated community in Montgomery County in the state of Alabama. The Mount Meigs Campus, a juvenile correctional facility and the headquarters of the Alabama Department of Youth Services, is in Mount Meigs. Mount Meigs is located at 32°21′46″N 86°6′7″W.

== History ==
According to the Montgomery City Directory of 1880, it had a three churches (South, A. M. E., and Baptist), and two schools, "one white and one colored". It had daily mail delivery.

Georgia Washington established what became known as the People’s Village school and later the Georgia Washington School.

The area's major export in the mid-19th century to 1940 was lumber. Cook Station and Mount Meigs Station were two main stations in the region. During World War II they switched to hauling gravel.

== Government and infrastructure ==
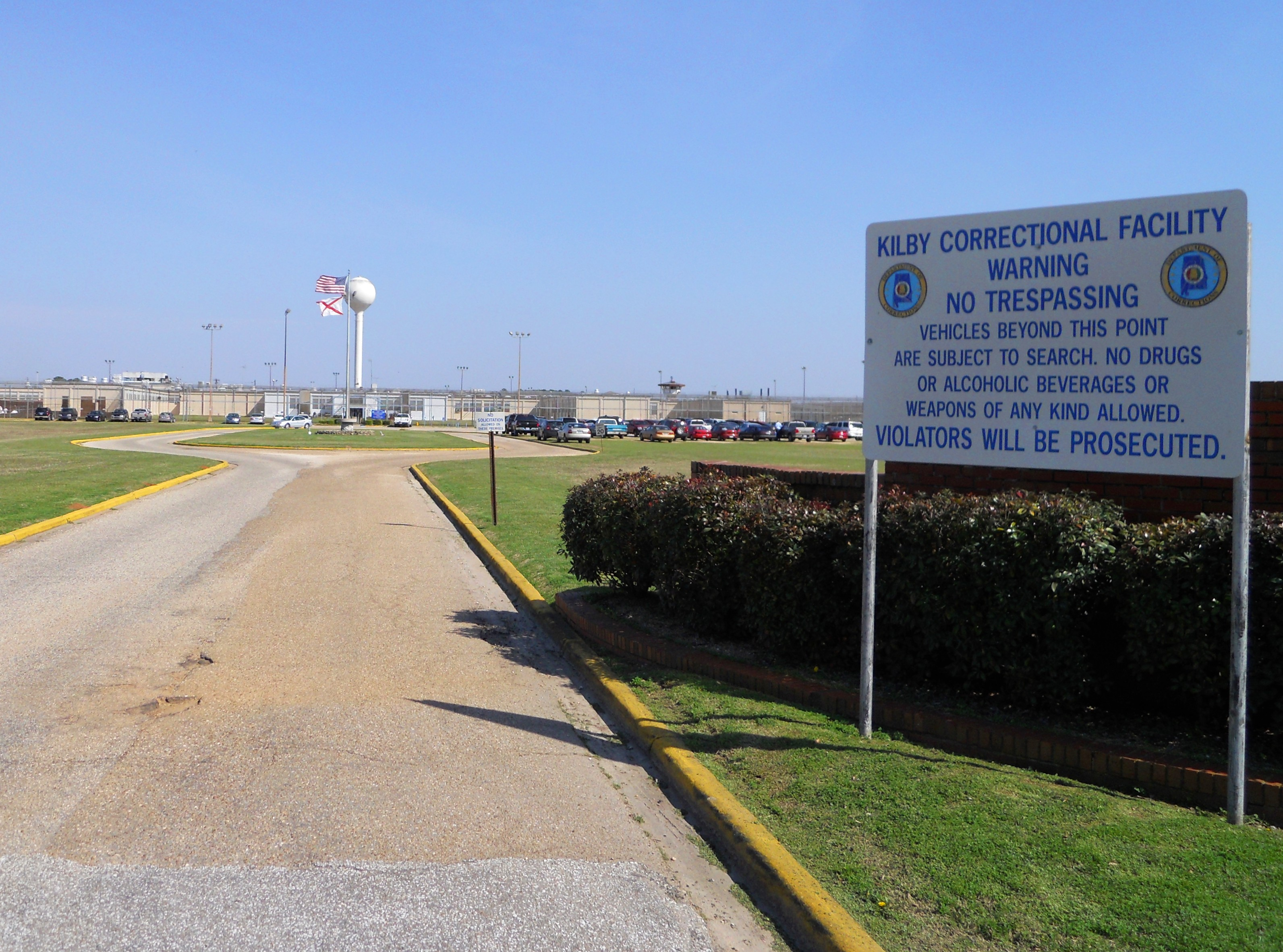
Kilby Correctional Facility

The Alabama Department of Corrections (ADOC) operates the Kilby Correctional Facility in Mount Meigs. Kilby serves as receiving and processing center for all male Alabama state inmates. The Montgomery Women's Facility, an ADOC facility for women, is located behind Kilby.

The Mount Meigs Campus, a juvenile correctional facility and the headquarters of the Alabama Department of Youth Services, which operates the campus, is in Mount Meigs. The campus, historically named the Alabama Industrial School, opened in 1911 as the "Alabama Reform School for Juvenile Negro Law-Breakers", was changed to the "Alabama Industrial School for Negro Children" in 1947, and became the Alabama Industrial School in 1970.

The United States Postal Service operates the Mount Meigs Post Office.

== Demographics ==
In July, 2007 the Mount Meigs area population was 5,564.

== Education ==
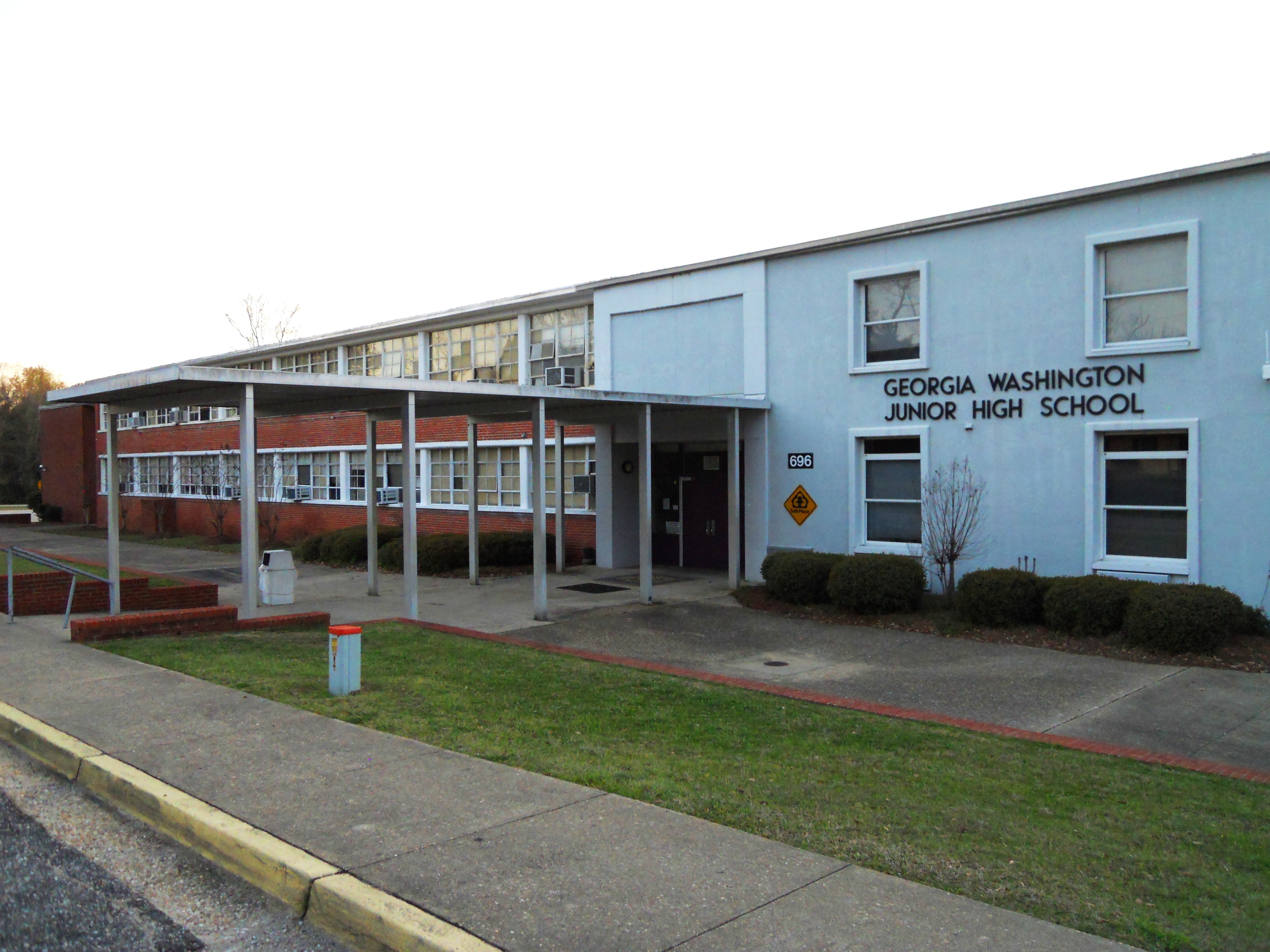
Georgia Washington Junior High School, now Pike Road High School

The Montgomery Public Schools district formerly operated Georgia Washington Middle School in Mount Meigs. It is now Pike Road High School.

In 1893 a woman named Georgia Washington, a former slave, arrived in Mount Meigs to start a school. By October of that year she opened a public school in her 12-foot (3.7 m) by 13-foot (4.0 m) rented cabin. It later moved to the Antioch Baptist Church. By February 1894 the residents bought a plot of land and built an 18-foot (5.5 m) by 36-foot (11 m) schoolhouse. By 1916 the Peoples Village School occupied a two-story schoolhouse. The current Georgia Washington School opened in 1950. Washington died in 1952, and the school occupying what was the Peoples Village School was renamed after her. In 1974 the school was converted into a middle school. A new wing at Washington Middle opened in 2004.

== Notable residents ==
- J. Marion Sims, physician. In a letter of 1836, Sims described the town as "nothing bur a pile of gin-houses, stables, blacksmith-shops, grog-shops, taverns and stores, thrown together in one promiscuous huddle".
- Fred Shuttlesworth, civil rights activist; born in Mount Meigs
- Vernon H. Vaughan, Governor of Utah Territory; born in Mount Meigs
- Anarcha "Westcott", enslaved woman, Mother of Modern Gynaecology

== Gallery ==
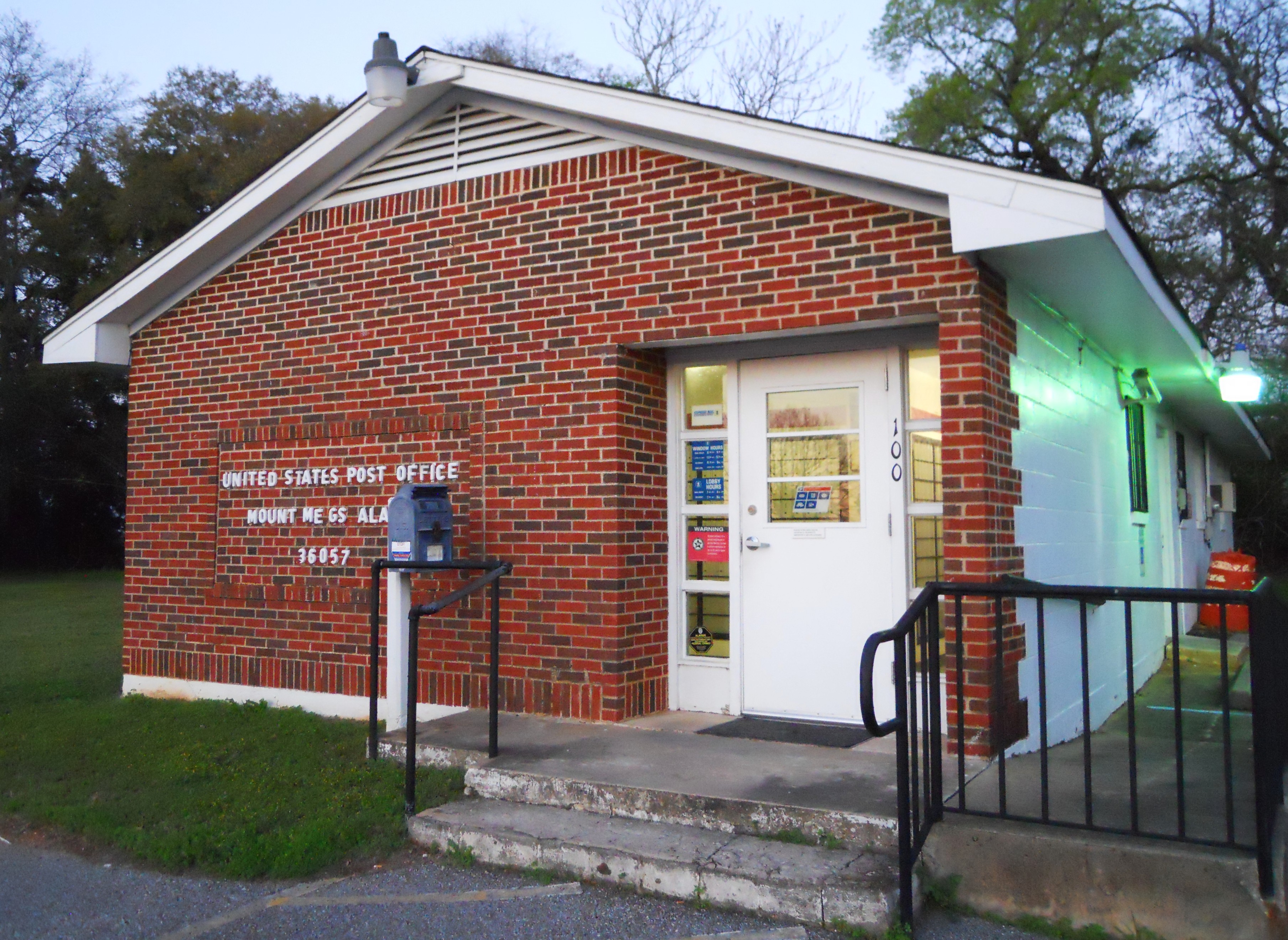
Mount Meigs Post Office (ZIP Code: 36057)

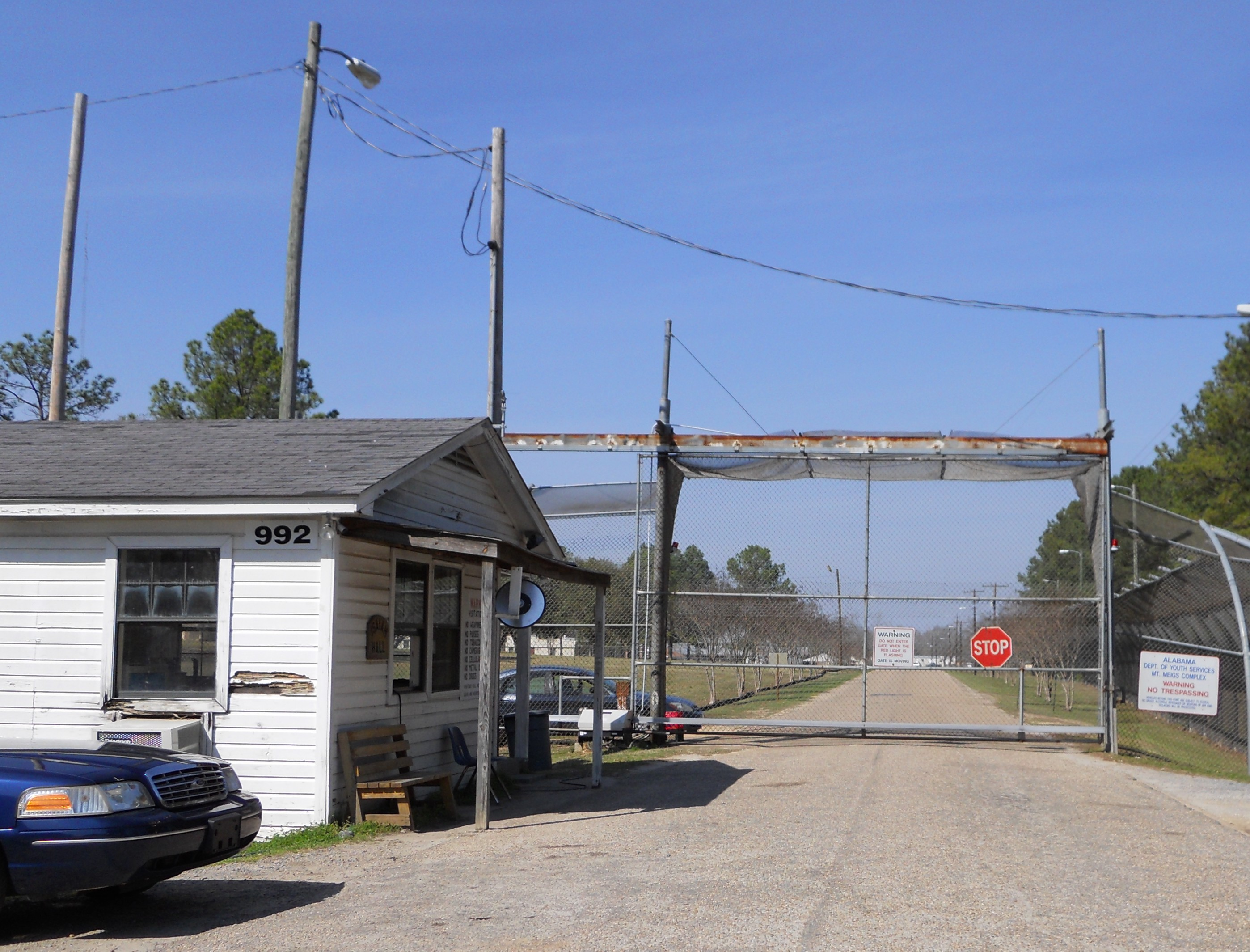
Mount Meigs Campus

== See also ==
- Alabama Department of Youth Services School District
