= Alabama World War II Army airfields =

Military facilities in U.S. state of Alabama

Alabama World War II Army Airfields
- Part of World War II

Site information
- Type: Army Airfields

Location
- Map of major Alabama World War II Army Airfields Third Air Force AAF Training Command; AAF Contract Flying Schools; Air Technical Service Command

Site history
- Built: 1940–1944
- In use: 1940–present

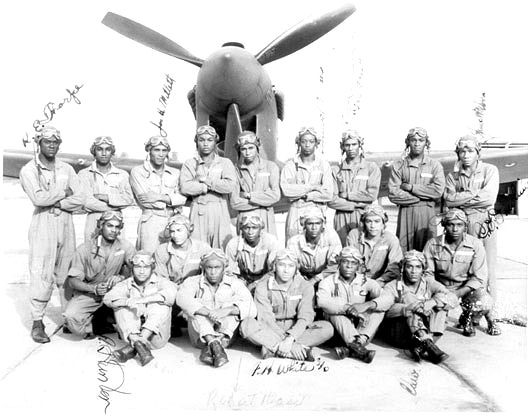
Official US Army Air Force Training Command photograph of 20 Tuskegee Airmen posing in front of a P-40 at Tuskegee Army Air Field

During World War II, the United States Army Air Forces (USAAF) established numerous airfields in Alabama for antisubmarine defense in the Gulf of Mexico and for training pilots and aircrews of AAF fighters and bombers.

Most of these airfields were under the command of Third Air Force or the Army Air Forces Training Command (AAFTC) (a predecessor of the current-day United States Air Force Air Education and Training Command). However, the other USAAF support commands (Air Technical Service Command (ATSC); Air Transport Command (ATC) or Troop Carrier Command) commanded a significant number of airfields in a support roles.

It is still possible to find remnants of these wartime airfields. Many were converted into municipal airports, some were returned to agriculture and several were retained as United States Air Force installations and were front-line bases during the Cold War. Hundreds of the temporary buildings that were used survive today, and are being used for other purposes.

== Major Airfields ==
=== Third Air Force ===
- Demopolis Army Air Field, 8 miles (13 km) west-southwest of Demopolis

Detachment, 39th Base Headquarters and Air Base Squadron
Auxiliary of Key Field, Mississippi
Now: Demopolis Municipal Airport (ICAO: KDYA, FAA LID: DYA, formerly 7A2)

- Camp Sibert Army Air Field, 5 miles (8.0 km) west-southwest of Gadsden

Support of The Chemical Warfare Service, Camp Sibert
Now: Northeast Alabama Regional Airport (IATA: GAD, ICAO: KGAD, FAA LID: GAD)

=== AAF Training Command ===
AAF Eastern Flying Training Command

- Courtland Army Air Field, 1-mile (1.6 km) southwest of Courtland

Army Air Forces Basic Flying School/Army Air Forces Pilot School (Basic)/Army Air Forces Pilot School (Special, 4-Engine), 14 December 1942-30 June 1945
446th Base Headquarters and Air Base Squadron 19 December 1942-30 April 1944
2115th Army Air Force Base Unit 1 May 1944-1 November 1945
Known sub-bases and auxiliaries

Danville Auxiliary Field
Trinity Auxiliary Field
Bay Auxiliary Field
Leighton Auxiliary Field
Muscle Shoals Auxiliary Field

Now: Courtland Airport (FAA LID: 9A4)

- Craig Field, 5 miles (8.0 km) southeast of Selma

Air Corps Advanced Flying School (Single Engine)/Army Air Forces Advanced Flying School (Single Engine)/Army Air Forces Pilot School (Advanced, Single Engine) 16 December 1940-15 December 1945
57th Air Base Squadron/57th Base Headquarters and Air Base Squadron 16 December 1940-30 April 1944
2138th Army Air Force Base Unit (Pilot School, Advanced, Single Engine) 1 May 1944-15 December 1945
Free French Air Force pilot training
Known sub-bases and auxiliaries

Anniston Army Air Field
Selma Auxiliary Field (Selfield)
Furniss Auxiliary Field
Henderson Auxiliary Field
Mollette Auxiliary Field
Autaugaville Auxiliary Field

Later: Craig Air Force Base (1947-1977)
Now: Craig Field Airport (IATA: SEM, ICAO: KSEM, FAA LID: SEM)

- Gunter Field, 2 miles (3.2 km) northeast of Montgomery

Air Corps Basic Flying School/Army Air Forces Basic Flying School/ Army Air Forces Pilot School (Basic), 8 August 1940-10 September 1945
58th Air Base Squadron/58th Base Headquarters and Air Base Squadron, 3 October 1940-30 April 1944
2131st Army Air Forces Base Unit (Pilot School, Basic) 1 May 1944-13 December 1945
Known sub-bases and auxiliaries

McLemore Auxiliary Field
Elmore Auxiliary Field
Mount Meigs Auxiliary Field
Taylor Field
Dannelly Auxiliary Field

Now: Montgomery Air National Guard Base and Montgomery Regional Airport

Deatsville Auxiliary Field

Now: Gunter Annex (Non-flying USAF facility)

- Maxwell Field, 2 miles (3.2 km) west of Montgomery

Air Corps Tactical School, 15 July 1931-13 May 1942
Hq, Southeast Air Corps Training Center/Hq, Southeast Army Air Forces Training Center/Hq, Army Air Forces Eastern Flying Training Command, 1 September 1940-1 June 1946
Air Corps Replacement Center (Pilot)/Air Corps Replacement Training Center (Aircrew)/Army Air Forces Pre-flight School (Pilot), 21 February 1941-1 December 1944
14th Air Base Squadron/14th Base Headquarters and Air Base Squadron, 1 September 1940-30 April 1944
2132nd Army Air Forces Base Unit, 1 May 1944-15 December 1945
Headquarters, Air University
Known sub-bases and auxiliaries

Passmore Auxiliary Field
Troy Auxiliary Field
Autaugaville Auxiliary Field

Now: Maxwell Air Force Base (IATA: MXF, ICAO: KMXF, FAA LID: MXF)

- Napier Field, 7 miles (11 km) northwest of Dothan

Air Corps Advanced Flying School (Single Engine)/Army Air Forces Advanced Flying School (Single Engine)/Army Air Forces Pilot School (Advanced, Single Engine), 30 November 1941-19 October 1945
73d Air Base Squadron/73rd Base Headquarters and Air Base Squadron, 30 November 1941-30 April 1944
2116th Army Air Forces Base Unit (Pilot School, Advanced, Single Engine), 1 May 1944-January 1946
Known sub-bases and auxiliaries

Ozark Army Air Field

Now: Cairns Army Airfield

Wiksburg Auxiliary Field
Dothan Auxiliary Field
Headland Auxiliary Field
Goldberg Auxiliary Field
Hyman Auxiliary Field

Now: Dothan Regional Airport (IATA: DHN, ICAO: KDHN, FAA LID: DHN)

- Tuskegee Army Air Field, 7 miles (11 km) northwest of Tuskegee

Army Air Forces Flying School (Basic-Advanced)/Army Air Forces Pilot School (Basic-Advanced), July 1942-14 April 1946
Base Detachment/318th Air Base Squadron/318 Base Headquarters and Air Base Squadron, 10 November 1941-30 April 1944
2143rd Army Air Forces Base Unit (Pilot School, Basic-Advanced), 1 May 1944-14 April 1946
Known sub-bases and auxiliaries

Griel Auxiliary Field
Shorter Auxiliary Field

Note: See Moton Field for Tuskegee Airmen National Historic Site
Now: Sharpe Field (IATA: TGE, FAA LID: AL73)

==== Contract Flying Schools ====
- Bates Field, 10 miles (16 km) west of Mobile

Contract Pilot School, Glider, 6 July 1942-15 February 1943
533rd Base Headquarters and Air Base Squadron, 25 May 1943-1 April 1944
4120th Army Air Forces Base Unit, 1 April 1944-2 April 1945
Under Contract to: Waterman Airlines
Known sub-bases and auxiliaries

St Elmo Auxiliary Field

Later: Sub-Base of Brookley Field (ATC)
Now: Mobile Regional Airport (IATA: MOB, ICAO: KMOB, FAA LID: MOB) and
Coast Guard Aviation Training Center Mobile

- Decatur Field, 3 miles (4.8 km) northwest of Decatur

Operated by 65th AAF Flying Training Detachment (Primary)
Under Contract to: Southern Airways
Known sub-bases and auxiliaries

Harris Station Auxiliary Field
Anderson Auxiliary Field
Beaver Dam Auxiliary Field
Poole Auxiliary Field
Tanner Auxiliary Field

Now: Pryor Field Regional Airport (IATA: DCU, ICAO: KDCU, FAA LID: DCU)

- Roberts Field Airport, 4 miles (6.4 km) west of Birmingham

Contract Glider Training
Later: Auxiliary of Birmingham Army Air Field (ATC)
Now: Industrial site 33°31′05″N 086°52′23″W

- Hargrove Van de Graaft Airport, 3 miles (4.8 km) northwest of Tuscaloosa

Operated by 51st AAF Flying Training Detachment (Primary)
Under Contract to: Alabama Institute of Aeronautics
Known sub-bases and auxiliaries

Albright Auxiliary Field
Foster Auxiliary Field
Knauer Auxiliary Field
Moody Auxiliary Field
Rice Auxiliary Field

Now: Tuscaloosa Regional Airport (IATA: TCL, ICAO: KTCL, FAA LID: TCL)

- Moton Field, 4 miles (6.4 km) northwest of Tuskegee

Operated by 66th AAF Flying Training Detachment (Primary)
Under contract to Tuskegee Institute
Known sub-bases and Auxiliaries

Calabee Flight Strip
Hardaway Auxiliary Field
Kennedy Auxiliary Field

Now: Tuskegee Airmen National Historic Site
Now: Moton Field Municipal Airport (FAA LID: 06A)

=== Air Technical Service Command ===
- Birmingham Army Air Field, 5 miles (8.0 km) northeast of Birmingham

310th Base Headquarters and Air Base Squadron, 27 May 1942-17 April 1944
4139th Army Air Force Base Unit, 1 May 1945-unknown date
Joint USAAF/Civil Use
Also used by Third Air Force and Air Transport Command
Now: Birmingham Air National Guard Base (IATA: BHM, ICAO: KBHM, FAA LID: BHM)

- Brookley Field, 4 miles (6.4 km) south of Mobile.

Mobile Air Depot Control Area/Mobile Air Service Command/Mobile Air Technical Service Command/Mobile Air Materiel Area, 1 February 1943-30 June 1968
480th Base Headquarters and Air Base Squadron, 1 January 1943-1 April 1944
4119th Army Air Force Base Unit/4119th Air Force Base Unit, 1 April 1944-28 August 1948
Also used by Air Transport Command
Was: Brookley Air Force Base (1948-1969)
Now: Mobile Downtown Airport (IATA: BFM, ICAO: KBFM, FAA LID: BFM)

=== Minor Airfields ===
- Fort McClellan Army Air Field, 6 miles (9.7 km) north-northeast of Anniston

US Army Support
Now: Abandoned

- Huntsville Arsenal Army Air Field, 6 miles (9.7 km) southwest of Huntsville

US Army Support
Now: Redstone Army Airfield (IATA: HUA, ICAO: KHUA, FAA LID: HUA)

- Chilton CAA Intermediate Field, 1 mile (1.6 km) northeast of Clanton

Undetermined USAAF Use
Now: Chilton County Airport (FAA LID: 02A)

- Thomas C. Russell Field, 2 miles (3.2 km) south-southwest of Alexander

Undetermined USAAF Use

- Weedon Field, 4 miles (6.4 km) north-northeast of Eufaula

Undetermined USAAF Use
