= Mildred Hemmons Carter =

American aviator (1921–2011)

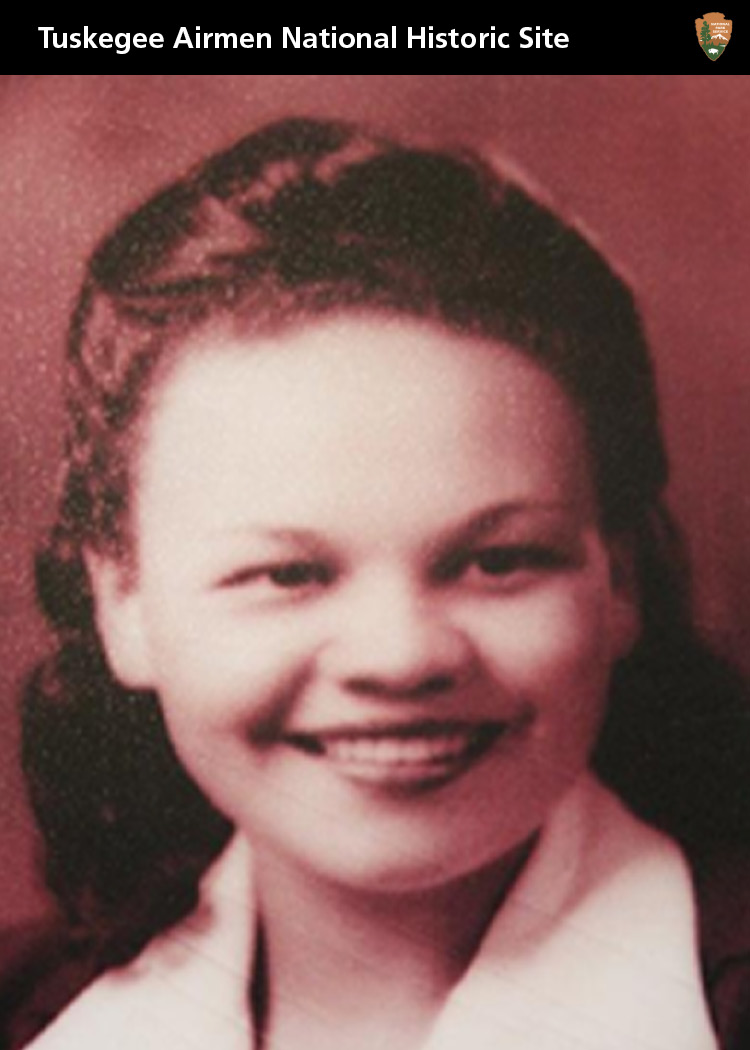
- Born: September 14, 1921; Chilton County, Alabama
- Died: October 21, 2011 (aged 90); Tuskegee, Alabama
- Known for: Designated Original Tuskegee Airman
- Spouse: Herbert Carter (married 1942-2011)

Mildred Louise Hemmons Carter (1921–2011) was one of the first women to earn a pilot's license through the Civilian Pilot Training Program, making her the first black female pilot in Alabama. Though she was denied admission into the Tuskegee Airmen and the Women Airforce Service Pilots, she was declared an official member of both later in life.

== Childhood ==
Carter was born Mildred Louise Hemmons on September 14, 1921 to Mamie and Luther Hemmons. Her mother was the town's postmaster, while her father was the foreman of a sawmill. Born in Benson, Alabama, she lived in Tuskegee for a time before her family moved to Enfield, North Carolina. There, her father worked as business manager of the all-black Bricks Junior College. After the school closed during the Great Depression, the Hemmons family moved to Holly Springs, Mississippi. Carter finished high school in Holly Springs at the age of fifteen.

== Career and marriage ==
=== Education and pilot training ===
After her family returned to Tuskegee, Carter enrolled in Tuskegee University, where she majored in business. She worked in an office that processed applications for Tuskegee University's branch of the Civilian Pilot Training Program (CPTP). Carter applied to the program herself, but was initially rejected because she had not yet turned eighteen. The next year, she applied again and was accepted.

Carter graduated with Tuskegee's first class of CPTP trainees. On February 1, 1941, she received her private pilot's certificate, making her the first black female pilot in Alabama. She primarily flew a Piper J-3 Cub that she rented from the school.

The month after earning her certificate, Carter met First Lady Eleanor Roosevelt, who was visiting Tuskegee to demonstrate support for its pilots. Carter recalled that "Mrs. Roosevelt was very gracious; I was tongue tied."

=== Relationship with Herbert Carter ===
Mildred first met Herbert Carter in 1939 when they crossed paths on the Tuskegee campus. Herbert later said that he was instantly attracted to her, but lacked the confidence to ask her on a date. He eventually asked her to a campus dance after learning that, like him, she was enrolled in the CPTP.

Herbert, a cadet in class 42-F of the Tuskegee Airmen, was not allowed to leave the air base or to date other Tuskegee students during his training. On weekends, he would arrange to take a plane out for "maintenance flight checks" and meet Mildred, flying her rented plane, over Lake Martin. The couple would wave and blow kisses as they flew past each other. After Herbert finished his cadet training, they were married on August 21, 1942 at the Tuskegee Army Airfield chapel.

=== Civil Air Patrol ===
Carter often flew with Charles Alfred Anderson, Tuskegee's chief flight instructor, who encouraged her ambitions and considered her one of his best students. In 1942, Carter and Anderson traveled to Montgomery, Alabama to sign up for the Civil Air Patrol, making Mildred the first black woman in the Montgomery Civil Air Patrol Squadron. Due to their race, however, neither Carter nor Anderson were ever called to patrol for the state.

=== Rejection from the WASP ===
Because she was a woman, Carter was not able to pursue more advanced training through Tuskegee's Civilian Pilot Training Program. Instead, she applied to the Women Airforce Service Pilots. By the time of her application, she had logged more than 100 hours of flying time. Nevertheless, she was rejected. Carter destroyed her rejection letter, but according to her, it came directly from Jackie Cochran and stated that "I was not eligible because of my race. It left no doubt."

=== Moton Field ===
During World War II, Carter worked at Moton Field, "the only primary flight facility for African-American pilot candidates" in the United States Air Force. She was Chief Clerk of the Quartermaster Corps. In addition to administrative work, she rigged parachutes and operated a bulldozer to clear airstrips.

=== Post-WWII ===
After the war, Herbert's career took the Carters across the United States and Europe. Eventually, they returned to Tuskegee. They had three children.

Mildred Carter mentored and encouraged younger black women to become pilots. Her protégés included several women who went on to become flight nurses and aerospace engineers. Roosevelt Lewis Jr., an airfield manager who, like Carter, was trained by Charles Anderson, said that "Mildred is really recognized here in Tuskegee as one of the Tuskegee Airmen."

Carter and Anderson continued flying together into the 1980s. In 1985, when Carter was 64, she had to give up flying due to a broken hip.

In February 2011, Carter was declared an official member of the Women Airforce Service Pilots. She was also a Designated Original Tuskegee Airman.

Carter died after a long illness on October 21, 2011.
