= Herbert Carter (pilot) =

U.S. Army Air Force officer (1919–2012)

Herbert Eugene Carter
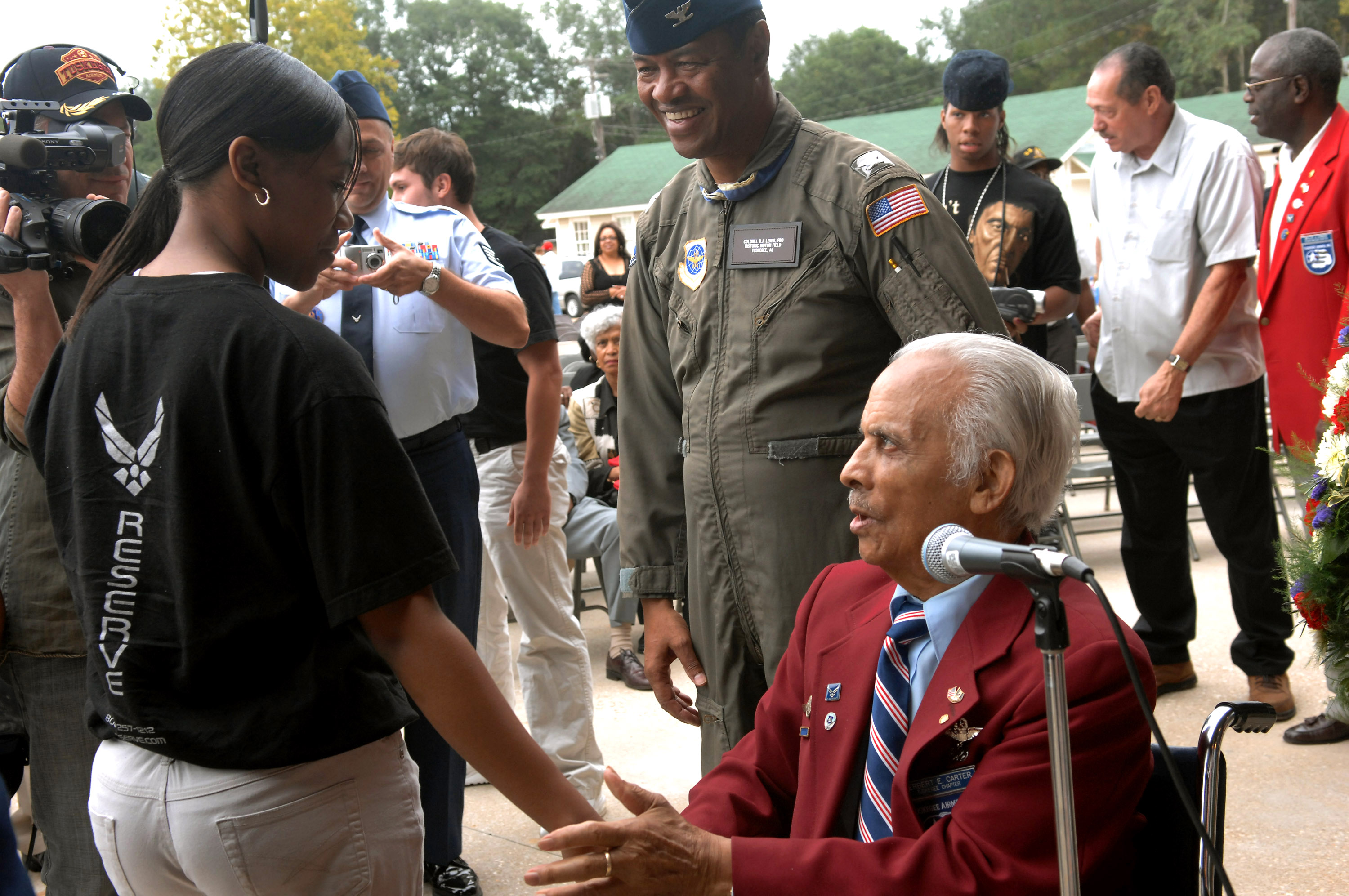
- Born: September 27, 1919; Amory, Mississippi
- Died: November 8, 2012 (aged 93); Opelika, Alabama
- Relatives: Mildred Hemmons Carter (wife)
- Military career
- Allegiance: United States of America
- Branch: United States Army Air Corps
- Nicknames: Gene, Geno
- Unit: 99th Flying Training Squadron
- Awards: Legion of Honour

Herbert Eugene Carter (September 27, 1919 – November 8, 2012) was an American military officer of the United States Air Force. He was a member of the original thirty-three members of the Tuskegee Airmen. He flew 77 missions with the Tuskegee Airmen during World War II.

== Childhood and family ==
Carter was born in Amory, Mississippi on September 27, 1919. He was one of ten children in his family. His father, George Washington Carter, was African-American, while his mother, Willie Ann Sykes Carter, was Native American. George Washington Carter was Amory's superintendent of utilities, "a prominent position for a black man of that era."

== Education and military training ==
Carter's parents sent him to Tuskegee, Alabama at age sixteen to continue his education. There, he lived with his older brother, who also ran the grocery store where Herbert worked. He finished high school in Tuskegee and went on to Tuskegee University. Carter enrolled in the university's branch of the Civilian Pilot Training Program with the goal of using his flying skills and education to become a rural veterinarian "flying from farm to farm". But during his first flight, he said, "something bit me". He became committed to a life as a military aviator.

Carter was a cadet in Class 42-F of the Tuskegee Airmen, the fourth class to graduate from Tuskegee Army Airfield. He was his class's Cadet Captain and Maintenance Engineering Officer.

== Marriage to Mildred Hemmons ==
In 1939, Carter met Mildred Hemmons, a business major at Tuskegee University. Carter remembered that he was too shy to ask her out at first, but worked up the courage after finding out she was also enrolled in the Civilian Pilot Training Program. While a cadet, Carter was not allowed to date. Instead, he would schedule a maintenance flight check during the weekend and meet Mildred, who flew a rented plane, above nearby Lake Martin. On August 21, 1942, they married at the Tuskegee Army Airfield chapel.

== 99th Flying Training Squadron ==
During World War II, Carter was assigned to the 99th Flying Training Squadron, where he served as both Chief of Maintenance and a fighter pilot. Carter flew seventy-seven combat missions in the North African, Sicilian, and European campaigns. One of the squadron's best-known tasks was to escort bombers and defend them from enemy fire. "[T]he men were so good at protecting them," Carter recalled, "that the bombers started referring to them as the Red-Tail Angels." In 2004, Carter received the French Legion of Honour for "outstanding service rendered France during the Second World War."

In a letter to Mildred Carter, dated March 3, 1944, Carter writes:

"Lane is leaving to return to Rose and America. You will find him a changed man. Please let that be an example to you of how this stuff really works on a brother. We are not the same. We can't be the same."

On August 7, 2020, Moton Field in Tuskegee, Alabama named its newest airport terminal the Colonel Herbert E. Carter Terminal.

== Post-World War II ==
Carter served in the United States Air Force for 25 years before retiring as a lieutenant colonel in 1969. He obtained a Bachelor of Science in education in 1955 and a master's degree in education in 1969, both from the Tuskegee Institute, while simultaneously serving as an active-duty Air Force officer.

Carter served at the Tuskegee Institute as an associate dean for student services, associate dean for admission and recruiting, and a financial aid counselor following his retirement from the Air Force. Together, the Carters were known as the "First Family" of the Tuskegee Airmen.

== Death ==
Lt. Colonel Herbert Carter died at the East Alabama Medical Center in Opelika, Alabama, on November 8, 2012, at the age of 93. He was the last surviving Tuskegee Airman from Mississippi.
