= Henderson Airport =

Henderson Airport may refer to:

- Henderson Airport (Alabama), a former airport in Millers Ferry, Alabama, United States
- Henderson Aviation Airport in Felton, Delaware, United States (FAA: 0N6)
- Henderson City-County Airport in Henderson, Kentucky, United States (FAA: HNZ)
- Henderson Executive Airport in Las Vegas, Nevada, United States (FAA: HND)
- Henderson-Oxford Airport in Oxford, North Carolina, United States (FAA: HNZ)

== See also ==
- Honiara International Airport, Solomon Islands, locally referred to as Henderson Airport after the World War II airfield (FAA: HIR)
- Rusk County Airport (Texas) in Henderson, Texas, United States (FAA: RFI)
- Henderson Field (disambiguation)
