= ALX =

ALX may refer to:

- Embraer EMB 314 Super Tucano, light attack aircraft
- Hewa Bora Airways, Congo (ICAO code)
- Thomas C. Russell Field, in Alabama, US (IATA code)
- Alexandria railway station (Scotland) (National Rail code)
- Union Station (Alexandria, Virginia) (Amtrak Code)
- Alex Gardner (singer), a Scottish singer who performs under the stage name A-L-X
- File name extension (".ALX") for various computer file types:
  - ActiveX Layout file
  - BlackBerry Application Loader File
- FPR2 or FPR2/ALX which is a receptor for certain lipoxins (also see Formyl peptide receptors)
