= Trinity Auxiliary Field =

Coordinates: 34°38′15″N 087°09′22″W

Trinity Auxiliary Field is a former facility of the United States Army Air Forces located in Trinity, Alabama. Constructed after 1941 as an auxiliary to the nearby Courtland Army Air Field, it was turned back into farmland after the war.

== See also ==
- Alabama World War II Army Airfields
- List of airports in Alabama
