= Fort McClellan Army Airfield =

Fort McClellan Army Airfield Henry J. Reilly Army Airfield
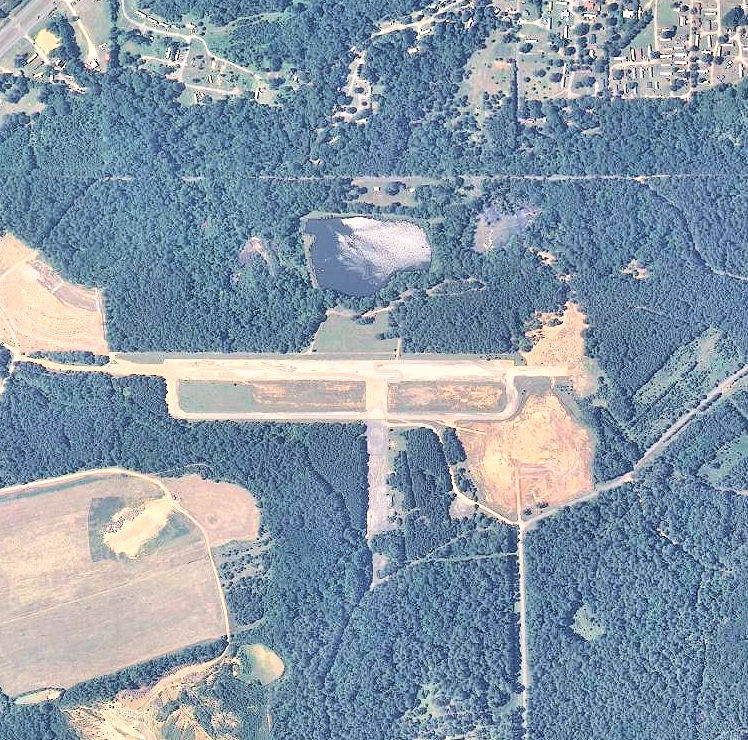
- 2006 USGS airphoto
- IATA: none; ICAO: none

Summary
- Serves: Fort McClellan, Alabama
- Coordinates: 33°44′43″N 085°46′50″W

Map
- Location of Fort McClellan Army Airfield

Fort McClellan Army Airfield is a closed military airfield located 6 mi (9.7 km) north-northeast of Anniston, Alabama, United States.

== History ==
The airfield was built in the 1930s to support Army activities at Fort McClellan, used by observation aircraft for artillery spotting and general surveillance of maneuvers. It was named in honor of Henry J. Reilly, a soldier and journalist.

In 1942–1943, the airfield was phased down and left unused for many years.

During the 1960s Vietnam War, the Army reactivated the airfield for used by helicopters and light observations aircraft. It also hosted flights of CH-47 Chinooks from Fort Benning on maneuvers. It was used in support of the chemical and WAC facilities during the late 60s until at least late 1973. From 1975 to 1999, the airfield was used for defensive driving training by the Military Police School at Fort McClellan. Although unused, aerial imagery showed that the runways were intact in 2006.

As of 2021, Google satellite imagery shows construction crews demolishing the runways of the air field.

== See also ==
- Alabama World War II Army Airfields
