= Wetumpka Municipal Airport =

Airport in Alabama, United States

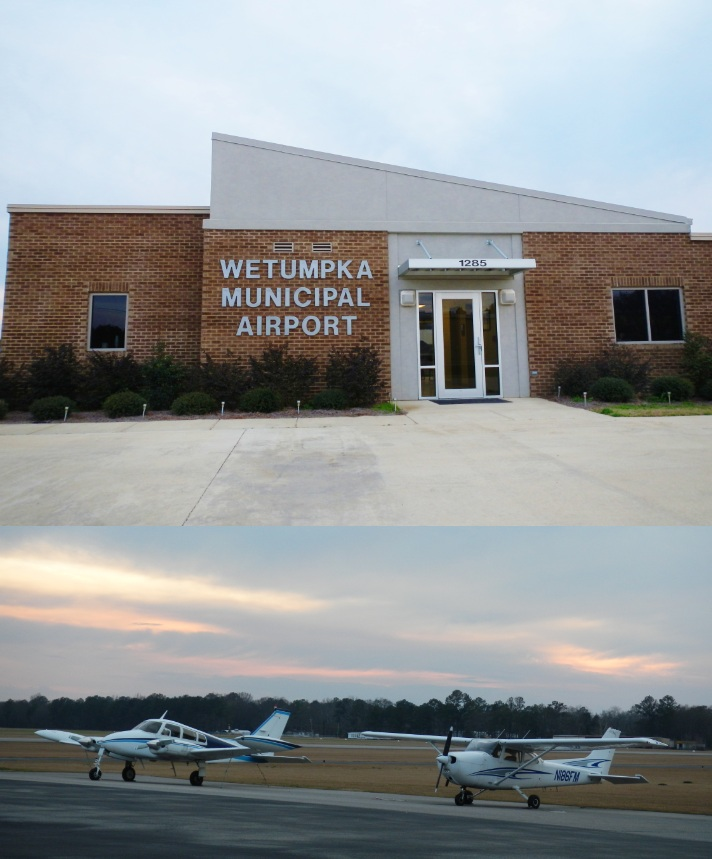
- Front entrance and airfield

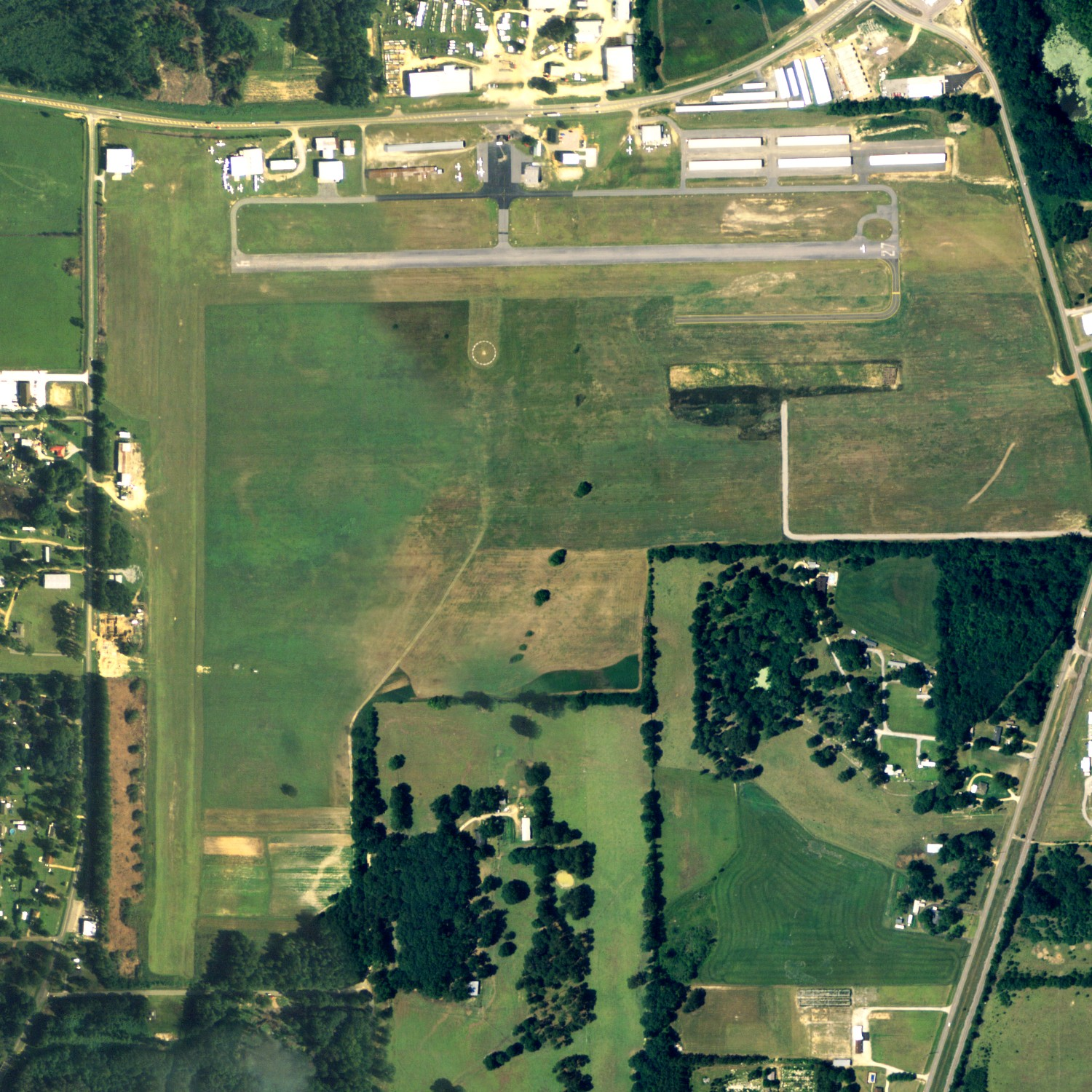
- NAIP aerial image, 2006
- IATA: none; ICAO: none; FAA LID: 08A

Summary
- Airport type: Public
- Owner: City of Wetumpka
- Serves: Wetumpka, Alabama
- Elevation AMSL: 197 ft / 60 m
- Coordinates: 32°31′46″N 086°19′42″W
- Interactive map of Wetumpka Municipal Airport

Runways
Direction	Length		Surface
Direction	ft	m	Surface
9/27	3,011	918	Asphalt
18/36	2,876	877	Turf

Statistics (2010)
- Aircraft operations: 39,400
- Based aircraft: 80
- Source: Federal Aviation Administration

Alabama Register of Landmarks and Heritage
- Designated: February 21, 2013

Wetumpka Municipal Airport (FAA LID: 08A) is a city-owned, public-use airport located six nautical miles (6.9 mi; 11 km) west of the central business district of Wetumpka, a city in Elmore County, Alabama, United States. It is included in the FAA's National Plan of Integrated Airport Systems for 2011–2015, which categorized it as a general aviation facility. During World War II the airport, known then as Elmore Auxiliary Field, served as an auxiliary field for Gunter Army Airfield training operations. In 2013 the airport was listed in the Alabama Register of Landmarks and Heritage.

== Facilities and aircraft ==
Wetumpka Municipal Airport covers an area of 312 acres (126 ha) at an elevation of 197 feet (60 m) above mean sea level. It has two runways: 9/27 is 3,011 by 80 feet (918 by 24 m) with an asphalt surface; 18/36 is 2,876 by 130 feet (877 by 40 m) with a turf surface.

For the 12-month period ending December 7, 2010, the airport had 39,400 general aviation aircraft operations, an average of 107 per day. At that time there were 80 aircraft based at this airport: 89% single-engine, 9% multi-engine, 1% helicopter and 1% glider.

== See also ==
- List of airports in Alabama
