= Danville Auxiliary Field =

Defunct airfield

Coordinates: 34°25′27″N 087°07′08″W

Danville Auxiliary Field is a former facility of the United States Army Air Forces located in Danville, Alabama. Constructed after 1941 as an auxiliary to the nearby Courtland Army Air Field, it was turned into Danville Airport following the war, and was eventually closed between 1986 and 1989. No trace of the airfield remains.

== See also ==
- Alabama World War II Army Airfields
- List of airports in Alabama
