= Passmore Auxiliary Field =

Defunct USAAF field in Prattville, Alabama

Coordinates: 32°21′30.00″N 86°32′0″W

Passmore Auxiliary Field is a former facility of the United States Army Air Forces located in Prattville, Alabama. Constructed after 1941 as an auxiliary to the nearby Maxwell Field, it was turned back into farmland after the war.

== See also ==
- Alabama World War II Army Airfields
- List of airports in Alabama
