= Selma Auxiliary Field =

Selfield Auxiliary Airfield
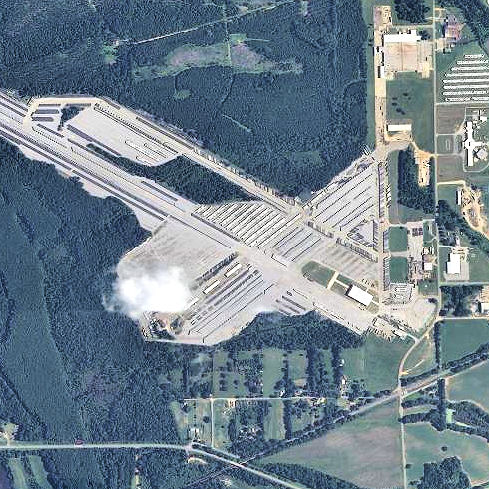
- 2006 USGS airphoto
- IATA: none; ICAO: none

Summary
- Operator: United States Army Air Force
- Location: Selma, Alabama
- Coordinates: 32°26′20″N 086°57′13″W

Map
- Location of Selma Auxiliary Field

Runways
Direction	Length		Surface
Direction	ft	m	Surface
12/30	5,800	1,780	asphalt
18/00	4,300	1,300	asphalt
23/05	4,140	1,260	asphalt

Selma Auxiliary Field was a United States Army facility located 8 kilometres (5.0 mi) east-northeast of Selma, Alabama. Following its closure, it became Selma Municipal Airport.

== History ==
The airport was built about 1943 as an auxiliary airfield to the Army pilot school at Craig Army Airfield. It was designated Selfield Army Auxiliary Airfield #1, and had three hard-surface runways. The field was said to not have any hangars and was apparently unmanned unless necessary for aircraft recovery.

The field was always closely tied to operations at Craig and served as an auxiliary field for a number of years during World War II with the initiation of Undergraduate Pilot Training for the Air Force though the 1960s. It became a joint use facility in the early 1950s with Delta Air Lines operating DC-3 service and later Southern Airways.

== See also ==
- Alabama World War II Army Airfields
