= Elmore Auxiliary Field =

Coordinates: 32°31′46″N 086°19′42″W

Elmore Auxiliary Field is a former facility of the United States Army Air Forces located in Montgomery, Alabama. Constructed after 1941 as an auxiliary to the nearby Gunter Field, it was redeveloped into Wetumpka Municipal Airport after the war.

== See also ==
- Alabama World War II Army Airfields
- List of airports in Alabama
