= Tallassee Airport =

Tallassee Airport Reeves Airport Griel Army Auxiliary Airfield #1
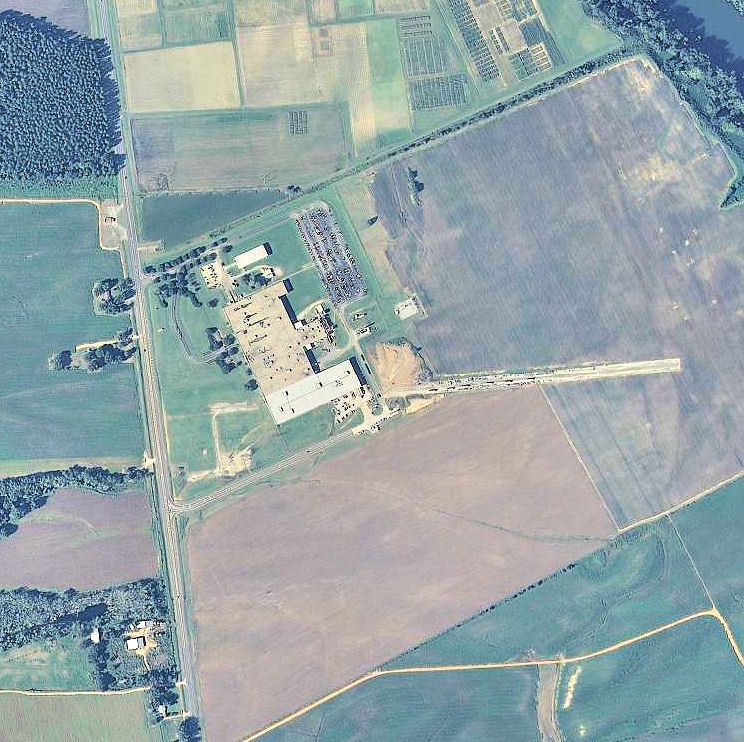
- 2006 USGS airphoto
- IATA: none; ICAO: none

Summary
- Serves: Tallassee, Alabama
- Coordinates: 32°28′55″N 085°53′07″W

Map
- Location of Tallassee Airport

Tallassee Airport is a closed airport located 4 miles (6.4 km) south of Tallassee, Alabama, United States.

== History ==
The airport was built about 1941 as one of two satellite airfields to the Army pilot school at Tuskegee Army Airfield. It was designated Griel Army Auxiliary Airfield #1 and was named after the original landowner. Griel Field was not yet built when its parent field (Tuskegee AAF) commenced training operations The field was said to not have any hangars and was apparently unmanned unless necessary for aircraft recovery.

Post-war, the airfield transitioned to private ownership and was renamed Tallassee Airport. Information about its closure in the 1970s is scarce.

Today, the airfield appears to be part of a light industrial estate, with the remains of the runway clearly visible in aerial photography.

== See also ==
- Alabama World War II Army Airfields
