= Demopolis Army Air Field =

Demopolis Army Airfield
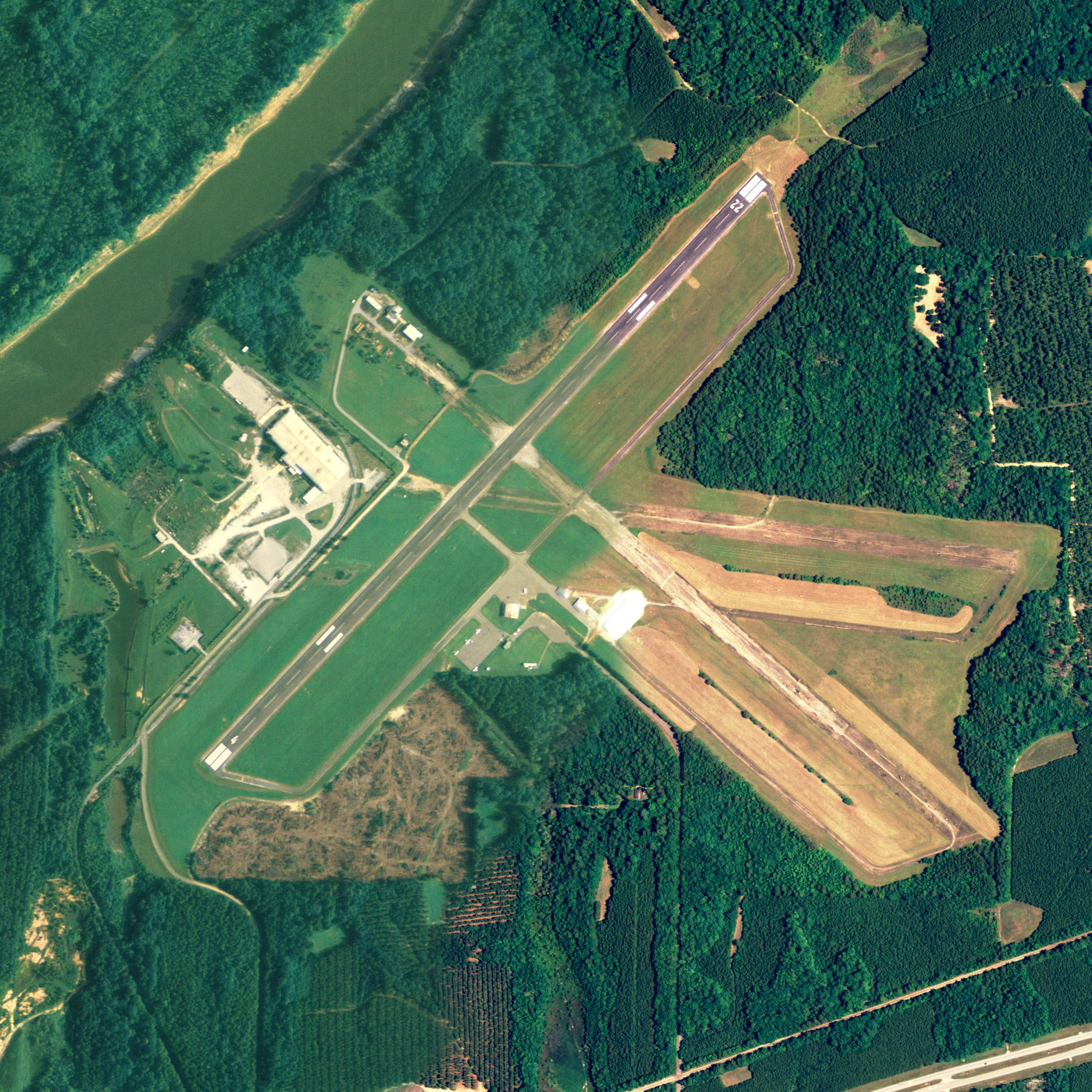
- NAIP aerial image, 18 August 2006
- IATA: none; ICAO: KDYA; FAA LID: DYA

Summary
- Airport type: Military
- Owner: United States Army
- Serves: Demopolis, Alabama
- Location: Marengo County, Alabama
- Elevation AMSL: 112 ft (34 m)
- Coordinates: 32°27′50″N 087°57′15″W

Map
- Location of airport in Alabama

Runways
Direction	Length		Surface
Direction	ft	m	Surface
4/22	5,002	1,525	Asphalt
- Source: Federal Aviation Administration

Demopolis Army Airfield is a former United States Army facility located six nautical miles (7 mi, 11 km) southwest of the central business district of Demopolis, a city in Marengo County, Alabama, United States.

== History ==
During World War II the airfield was built by the United States Army Air Forces and opened in October 1943. It was assigned to Third Air Force. It was used to train pilots as an axillary airfield to the group and replacement training center at Key Field, Mississippi. With the end of the war in September 1945, activities at Demopolis Army Airfield were diminished. The airfield was returned to civil control in 1946 and is now known as Demopolis Municipal Airport.

== See also ==
- Alabama World War II Army Airfields
- List of airports in Alabama
