= Courtland Army Airfield =

Former US Army airfield in Alabama

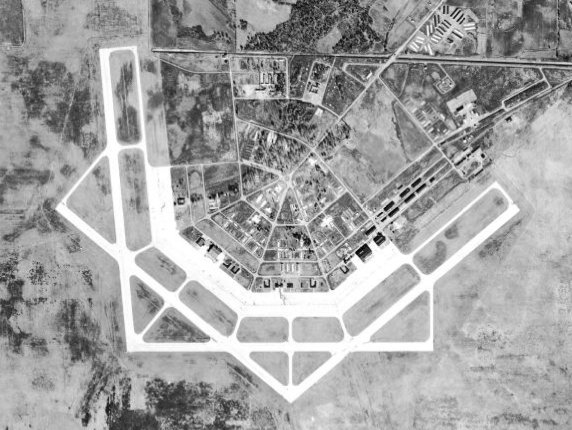
- Former Courtland Army Airfield, 28 December 1949
- IATA: none; ICAO: none

Summary
- Airport type: Military
- Owner: Lawrence County Commission
- Serves: Courtland, Alabama
- Elevation AMSL: 588 ft (179 m)
- Coordinates: 34°39′34″N 087°20′56″W

Map
- Location of airport in Alabama

Runways
Direction	Length		Surface
Direction	ft	m	Surface
13/31	4,994	1,522	Concrete
17/35	4,994	1,522	Concrete
- Source: Federal Aviation Administration

Courtland Army Airfield is a former United States Army facility located two nautical miles (4 km) northeast of the central business district of Courtland, a town in Lawrence County, Alabama, United States.

== History ==
see Courtland Airport for the civil use of the facility

Following the onset of World War II, the United States faced a challenging goal to train upwards of 75,000 to 100,000 pilots per year. It was recognized that to achieve this goal, many new training fields would have to be constructed - hundreds across the country. Due to the climate allowing year-round flight instruction, as well as the low airways congestion, North Alabama was considered to be a good location for one of the new Army Air Force training fields. Following a review by a site selection board, Courtland was chosen to receive this facility. It was considered the best overall site of three evaluated within the North Alabama region.

Selection took place and the land acquired in April 1942. Construction was rapid given the emergency wartime conditions and within three months the post was to be in full operation. The airfield consisted of four concrete runways 5000×150(N/S), 5000×150(NE/SW), 5000×150(E/W), 5000×150(NW/SE). Also many taxiways, landing aids, and an extended length parking apron. Auxiliary airfields to support the training activities at the base were:

- Danville Auxiliary Field (Auxiliary #1) 34°25′27″N 087°07′08″W
- Trinity Auxiliary Field (Auxiliary #2) 34°38′15″N 087°09′22″W
- Bay Auxiliary Field (Auxiliary #3) 34°42′49″N 087°15′45″W
- Leighton Auxiliary Field (Auxiliary #4) 34°39′27″N 087°29′40″W
- Muscle Shoals Auxiliary Field (Auxiliary #5) 34°44′50″N 087°36′50″W

In addition to the airfield, the building of a large support base with several hundred buildings, numerous streets, a utility network, was carried out with barracks, various administrative buildings, maintenance shops and hangars. The station facility consisted of a large number of buildings based on standardized plans and architectural drawings, with the buildings designed to be the "cheapest, temporary character with structural stability only sufficient to meet the needs of the service which the structure is intended to fulfill during the period of its contemplated war use" was underway. To conserve critical materials, most facilities were constructed of wood, concrete, brick, gypsum board and concrete asbestos. Metal was sparsely used. The station was designed to be nearly self-sufficient, with not only hangars, but barracks, warehouses, hospitals, dental clinics, dining halls, and maintenance shops were needed. There were libraries, social clubs for officers, and enlisted men, and stores to buy living necessities. The buildings, together with complete water, sewer, electric and gas utilities built within a short span of approximately 8 months, with the air field officially being activated in December 1942 as Courtland Army Air Field (CAAF). Courtland was assigned to the Southeast Training Center of the Army Air Force Training Command. It was commanded by the 446th Army Air Force Base Unit.

Courtland AAF was the home of a Basic Flying School which utilized Vultee BT-13s for the Air Cadets. Personnel were required to fire pistols or carbines for marksmanship training and practice gas attack drills. The chemical agents used during training were tear gas, mustard agent, chlorine gas, incendiary and smoke munitions.

The Basic Flight School was replaced by a Specialized 4-Engine Flight School in August 1944. Establishment of this school involved the transfer of B-24 "Liberator" bombers and personnel from Chanute Field, Illinois. During this time, in addition to the 4-Engine Flight School, a transition squadron was also emplaced at Courtland. The role of the transition squadron largely involved the retraining and/or reclassification of returning crews from Europe (crews who had fulfilled their required missions). Many personnel went on to B-29 schools at other locations as they were reclassified.

As training needs decreased toward the end of the war, training air fields were deactivated across the country. Courtland AAF was one of these, it being deactivated in June 1945. At the end of the war the airfield was determined to be excess by the War Department in 1946 and was excessed. The site was returned to the State of Alabama by Quitclaim deed in 1948 and now operates as Courtland Airport.

With regard to the original structures, most everything but the runways, and several concrete slabs with 3 or 4 wide concrete steps are gone now. A steel-framed aircraft hangar that was once used at Courtland still exists and is still in use, but is no longer located at the Courtland site. This structure was disassembled and moved to the Birmingham Municipal Airport (now Birmingham–Shuttlesworth International Airport) during the early 1950s.

From 1955 to 1967, the airbase was used for sports car racing.

== See also ==
- Alabama World War II Army Airfields
- 27th Flying Training Wing (World War II)
- List of airports in Alabama
