= Dothan Regional Airport =

Airport in Dale County, Alabama

Dothan Regional Airport (former Napier Army Airfield)

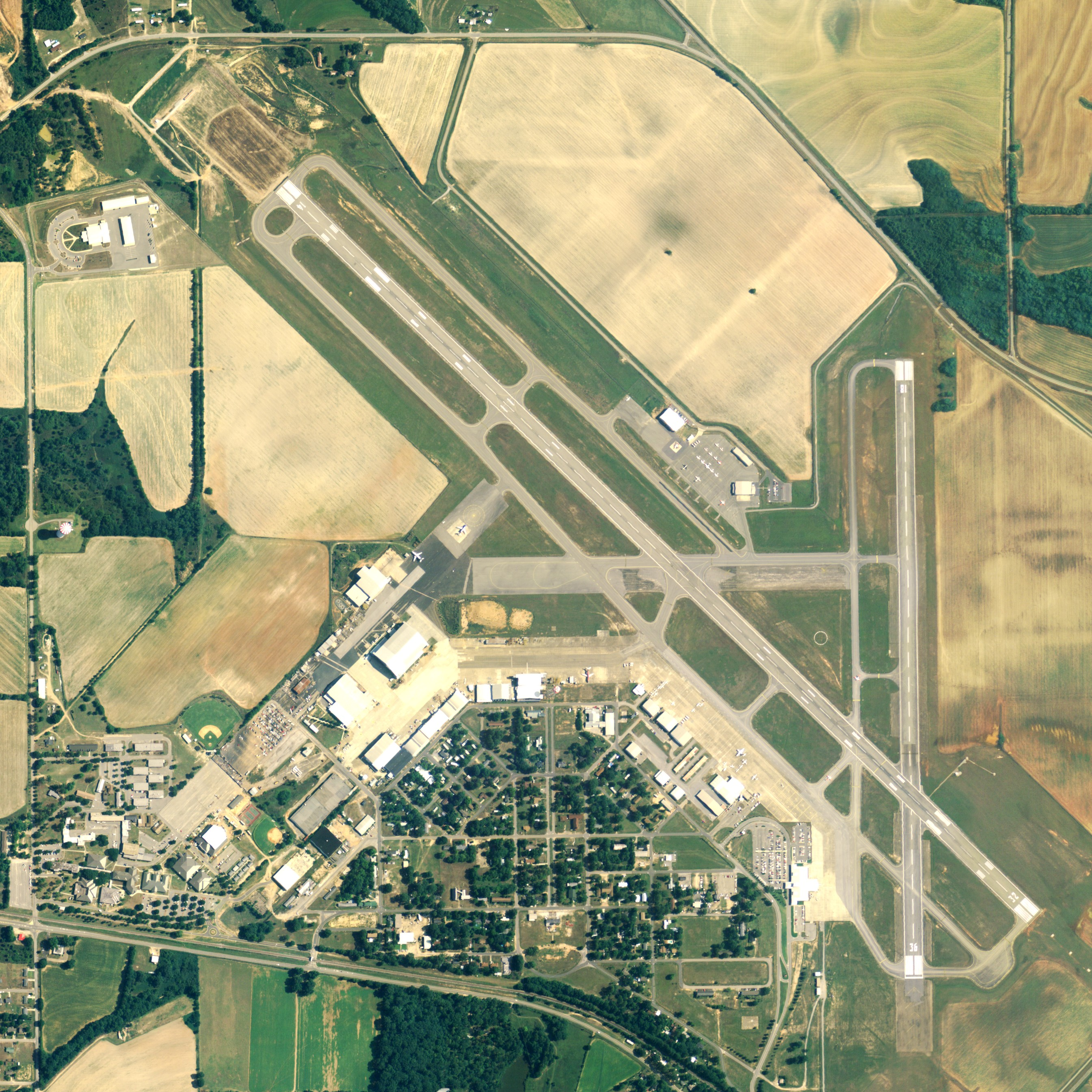
- NAIP image June 2006
- IATA: DHN; ICAO: KDHN; FAA LID: DHN

Summary
- Airport type: Public
- Owner: Dothan-Houston County Airport Authority
- Serves: Dothan, Alabama
- Elevation AMSL: 401 ft (122 m)
- Coordinates: 31°19′16″N 85°26′58″W
- Website: FlyDothan.com

Maps
- FAA diagram
- Location within Alabama Location within the United States

Runways
| Direction | Length | | Surface |
| Direction | ft | m | Surface |
|---|---|---|---|
| 14/32 | 8,499 | 2,590 | Asphalt |
| 18/36 | 5,498 | 1,676 | Asphalt |

Statistics (2020)
- Passengers: 47,990
- Aircraft operations: 77,706
- Based aircraft: 66
- Source: Bureau of Transportation, Federal Aviation Administration

Dothan Regional Airport (IATA: DHN, ICAO: KDHN, FAA LID: DHN) is a public airport in Dale County, Alabama, United States, seven miles northwest of Dothan, a city mostly in Houston County.

The National Plan of Integrated Airport Systems for 2011–2015 called it a primary commercial service airport (more than 10,000 enplanements per year). Federal Aviation Administration records say the airport had 47,859 passenger boardings (enplanements) in calendar year 2008, 42,071 in 2009 and 41,453 in 2010.

The only commercial airline service is provided by three times daily Delta Connection flights to Atlanta using CRJ-700 and CRJ-900 aircraft. Over 50% of Dothan's flights are military training operations from nearby Fort Rucker, NAS Whiting Field, and NAS Pensacola, while just under 40% are general aviation.

== History ==
In 1941 the United States Army Air Corps built Napier Field, named in honor of Major Edward L. Napier of Union Springs, Alabama. One of the Army's first flight surgeons, he was killed in the crash of a Fokker D.VII, AS-5382, at McCook Field, Dayton, Ohio, on 15 September 1923. He had been a Medical Corps Officer in World War I and had transferred to the Army Air Corps. He was receiving training as a flight surgeon at the time of his death. The official report states that he was piloting the plane himself and there was a structural failure of a wing.

Napier Field was assigned to the Southeast Training Center of the Army Air Forces Training Command. It was commanded by the 73d Army Air Force Base Unit. In addition to the main facility, the following known sub-bases and auxiliaries were built to support the training operations:

- Cairns Army Airfield 31°16′33″N 85°42′48″W
- Wicksburg Auxiliary Field 31°19′10″N 85°40′25″W (now: Knox Army Heliport, Fort Rucker)
- Dothan Auxiliary Field 31°14′28″N 85°26′36″W
- Headland Auxiliary Field 31°21′51″N 86°18′56″W
- Goldberg Auxiliary Field 31°24′50″N 85°27′36″W (now: Goldberg Stage Field, Fort Rucker)
- Hyman Auxiliary Field 31°18′48″N 85°07′32″W

The 29th Flying Training Wing was activated at Napier on December 26, 1942. The 2116th (Pilot School, Advanced, Single-Engine) was main operational group at Napier Field. The group flew mostly AT-6 Texans as well as providing advanced & specialized training in single engine aircraft, including P-40 fighters. The first aircraft began operating on the field on October 1, 1941.

On December 20, 1941, the first group of British cadets arrived for training under the Arnold Scheme. The first American cadets graduated on July 3, 1942 (42-F). In late May 1945, officers from the Mexican Army began P-40 training at Napier Field.

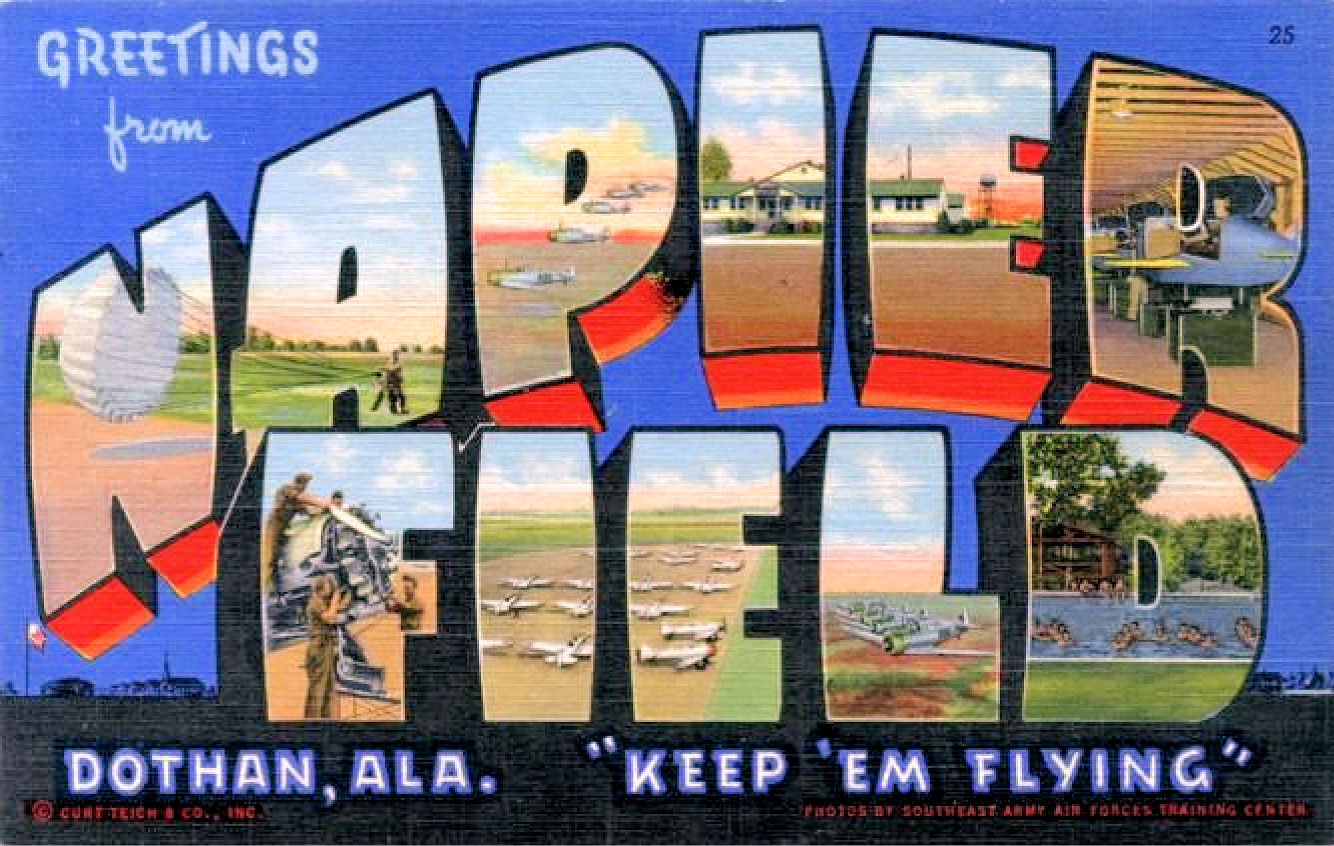
World War II Napier Field postcard

The field was inactivated by the U.S. Army Air Forces on October 31, 1945, and the airfield and its improvements were made available to the City of Dothan and Houston County under an Agreement in 1946 which was jointly accepted. The airport lands lay dormant for about 20 years and Houston County later turned its share of Napier Field to the city.

In the early 1960s, a complete overhaul of the facility commenced with the old USAAF airfield layout being largely dug up and converted into reinforced hard surface for new jet runways, buildings and other facilities for a civil airport. Dothan Regional Airport opened to commercial activity on February 15, 1965.

In 2004 the Air Force returned to the airport in the form of a non-flying unit, the 280th Combat Communications Squadron (280 CCS), an Air Force Special Operations Command (AFSOC)-gained unit of the Alabama Air National Guard, which established Dothan Regional Airport Air National Guard Station on the airport.

Until 1965 the municipal airport was three miles west of town, where the Westgate Rec Center is now. It had three runways, all 4006 feet or less. Eastern Airlines stopped there from 1945 to 1964; Southern Airways arrived in 1956 and continued at the new airport.

== Facilities ==
Dothan Regional Airport covers 1,150 acres (465 ha) at an elevation of 401 feet (122 m). It has two asphalt runways: 14/32 is 8,499 by 150 feet (2,590 x 46 m) and 18/36 is 5,498 by 100 feet (1,676 x 30 m).

In 2011 the airport had 85,201 aircraft operations, an average of 233 per day: 55% military, 40% general aviation, 4% airline, and 1% air taxi. 91 aircraft were then based at this airport: 52% single-engine, 40% multi-engine, 8% jet, and 1% helicopter.

In addition, FBO services are provided by Aero-One Aviation. Cargo aircraft conversions and other MRO related activities are performed by Commercial Jet. While defense contractors Amentum and CAE have on site facilities for Army fixed wing flight training, with CAE additionally providing rotary wing training for the USAF.

== Airlines and destination ==
=== Passenger ===
| Airlines | Destinations |
|---|---|
| Delta Connection | Atlanta |

=== Cargo ===
The following airlines offer scheduled cargo service:

| Airlines | Destinations |
|---|---|
| FedEx Feeder operated by Baron Aviation | Memphis |

Destination map
Destinations from Dothan Regional Airport

== Statistics ==
=== Top destinations ===
Busiest domestic routes from DHN (August 2024 – July 2025)
| Rank | Airport | Passengers | Carriers |
|---|---|---|---|
| 1 | (Georgia (U.S. state)) Atlanta, Georgia | 46,110 | Delta |

=== Annual enplanement ===
Annual enplanement at DHN
| Year | Enplanement | Change |
|---|---|---|
| 1999 | 66,025 | |
| 2000 | 69,220 | ▲4.8% |
| 2001 | 55,064 | ▼20.5% |
| 2002 | 57,911 | ▲5.2% |
| 2003 | 61,143 | ▲5.6% |
| 2004 | 69,094 | ▲13.0% |
| 2005 | 68,330 | ▼1.1% |
| 2006 | 57,552 | ▼15.8% |
| 2007 | 48,019 | ▼16.6% |
| 2008 | 47,859 | ▼0.3% |
| 2009 | 42,071 | ▼12.1% |
| 2010 | 41,453 | ▼1.5% |
| 2011 | 46,388 | ▲11.9% |
| 2012 | 46,452 | ▲0.1% |
| 2013 | 48,423 | ▲4.2% |
| 2014 | 50,309 | ▲3.9% |
| 2015 | 46,792 | ▼7.0% |
| 2016 | 49,411 | ▲5.6% |
| 2017 | 47,304 | ▼4.3% |
| 2018 | 52,855 | ▲11.7% |
| 2019 | 58,860 | ▲11.4% |
| 2020 | 23,968 | ▼59.3% |
| 2021 | 37,040 | ▲54.5% |
| 2022 | 38,180 | ▲3.1% |
| 2023 | 35,630 | ▼6.7% |
| 2024 | 39,270 | ▲7.4% |
| 2025 | 51,827 | ▲31.7% |

== Accidents and incidents ==
- In November 1985, a former US Air Force C-131H, AF Ser. No. 54-2817, which was in the process of being transferred from the Air Force to the US Navy's Fleet Air Logistics Squadron 48 (VR-48) at Andrews AFB/NAF Washington, Maryland, crashed on takeoff during a post-contract maintenance acceptance flight, killing the crew of 3 on board. Poor civilian contract maintenance on the elevator control cables was determined as the cause of the accident.
- On August 31, 1991, a Lloyd Aéreo Boliviano Boeing 707 (registered CP-1365) was destroyed in a hangar fire.

== See also ==
- List of airports in Alabama
- Alabama World War II Army Airfields
- 28th Flying Training Wing (World War II)
- Dothan Municipal Airport
