= Pryor Field Regional Airport =

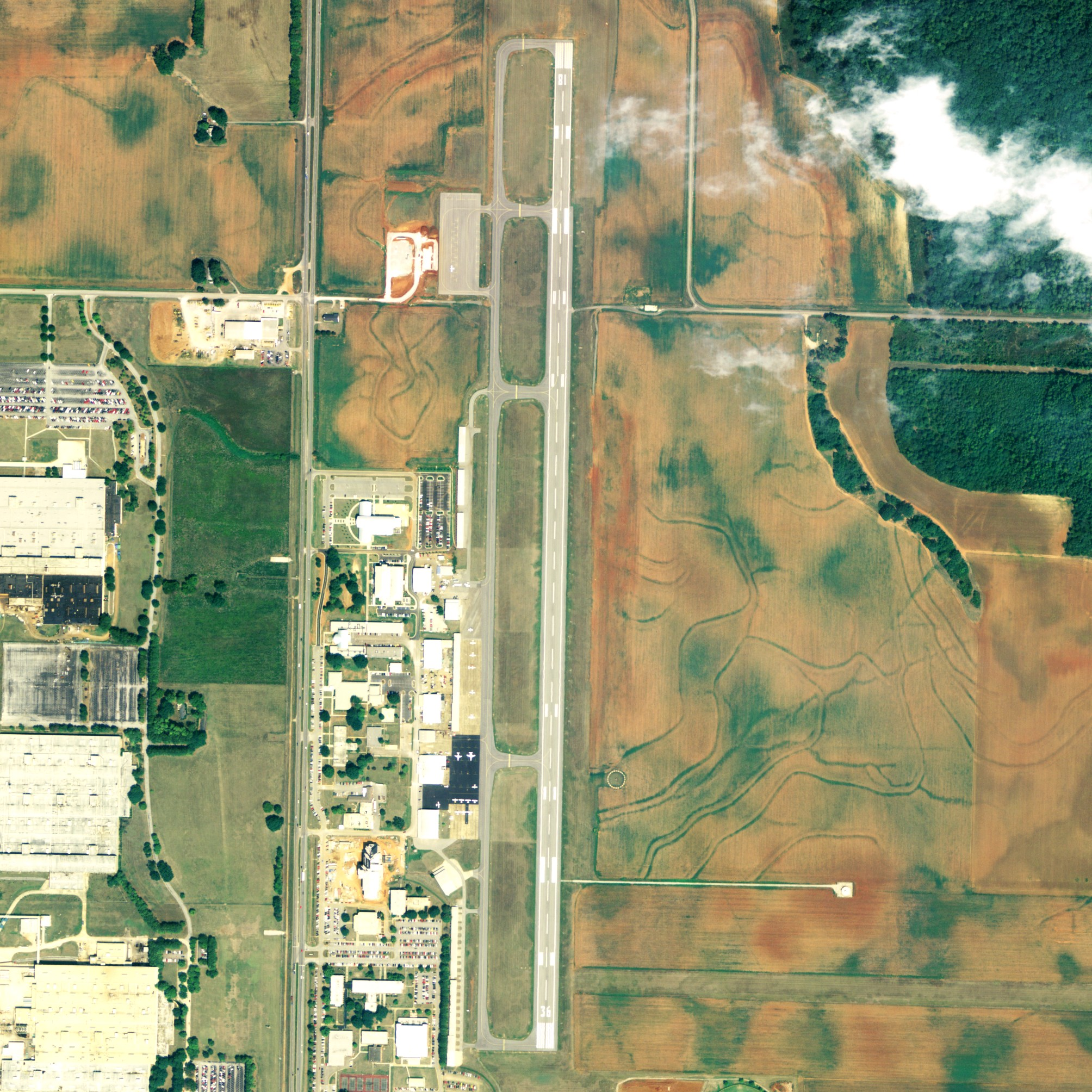
- 2006 USGS airphoto
- IATA: DCU; ICAO: KDCU; FAA LID: DCU

Summary
- Airport type: Public
- Owner: Pryor Field Airport Authority
- Serves: Decatur, Alabama
- Location: Limestone County, Alabama
- Elevation AMSL: 592 ft / 180 m
- Coordinates: 34°39′15″N 86°56′43″W

Map
- Location of Pryor Field Regional Airport KDCU (the United States)

Runways
Direction	Length		Surface
Direction	ft	m	Surface
18/36	6,107	1,861	Asphalt

Statistics (2017)
- Aircraft operations: 167,701
- Based aircraft: 73
- Source: Federal Aviation Administration

Alabama Register of Landmarks and Heritage
- Designated: December 16, 2010

Pryor Field Regional Airport (IATA: DCU, ICAO: KDCU, FAA LID: DCU) is a public airport located three miles (5 km) northeast of the central business district of Decatur and south of Athens, in Limestone County, Alabama, United States. It is owned by the Pryor Field Airport Authority.

Situated next to Calhoun Community College, the airport serves the western portion of the Huntsville-Decatur Combined Statistical Area and most of the Decatur Metropolitan Area. Pryor Field is currently the busiest regional airport in Alabama.

== Facilities and aircraft ==
Pryor Field Regional Airport covers an area of 200 acres (81 ha) which contains one asphalt paved runway (18/36) measuring 6,107 x 100 ft (1,861 x 30 m).

For the 12-month period ending May 3, 2006, the airport had 167,701 aircraft operations, an average of 459 per day: 91% general aviation, 7% military and 2% air taxi. There are 144 aircraft based at this airport: 79% single engine, 14% multi-engine, 3% jet aircraft, 3% helicopters and 1% gliders.

The Pryor Field Regional Airport receives $30,000 annually each from the cities of Athens and Decatur and from the county commissions of Morgan and Limestone.

== History ==
The airport opened in October 1941 with 4,600 by 4,600 feet (1,400 m × 1,400 m) square all-direction turf runway. It began training United States Army Air Corps flying cadets under contract to Southern Airways, Inc. and Southern Aviation Training School, Inc. It was assigned to Gulf Coast Training Center (later Central Flying Training Command) as a primary (level 1) pilot training airfield.

In addition, the school had had five local auxiliary airfields for emergency and overflow landings:

- Harris Station Auxiliary Field 34°40′55″N 86°59′40″W
- Anderson Auxiliary Field 34°42′35″N 86°53′05″W
- Beaver Dam Auxiliary Field 34°36′24″N 86°51′44″W
- Poole Auxiliary Field 34°32′20″N 86°59′45″W
- Tanner Auxiliary Field (location undetermined)

Flying training was performed with Fairchild PT-19s as the primary trainer. It also had several PT-17 Stearmans and a few P-40 Warhawks assigned. The airport was inactivated on December 28, 1944, with the drawdown of AAFTC's pilot training program. It was declared surplus and turned over to the Army Corps of Engineers on September 30, 1945. It was eventually discharged to the War Assets Administration (WAA) and became a civil airport.

A newly built $1.8 million terminal building opened in 2008 at the north end of the field as part of a federally funded $3.3 million project. This also included lengthening the runway to 6,000 feet (1,800 m) to accommodate larger jets and improve safety.

In January 2010, the pilot training site was designated a historic landmark and added to the Alabama Register of Landmarks and Heritage.

== Accidents and incidents ==
- In 2007, Chris Wright was struck by a propeller as he was "hand propping" starting his plane. He received a gash to the head, but recovered.
- In 2009, Steven Raddatz was killed when his Van's Aircraft RV-8 collided with a Russian-made Yakovlek owned and flown by B.J. Kennamore, the latter of which landed safely after the collision.

== See also ==
- Alabama World War II Army Airfields
- List of airports in Alabama
- 29th Flying Training Wing (World War II)
