= Troy Auxiliary Field =

Former US military airfield in Pike County, Alabama

Troy Auxiliary Field is a former facility of the United States Army Air Forces located in Troy, Alabama. Constructed after 1942 as an auxiliary to the nearby Maxwell Field, it was turned into Troy Municipal Airport after the war.

== History ==
Activated on 11 January 1942 as a satellite airfield for the United States Army Air Forces Maxwell Field near Montgomery. Known as Maxwell AAF Aux No. 4 – Troy (aka Troy No. 5)

Also conducted basic flying training throughout the war. Flying training was performed with Fairchild PT-19s as the primary trainer. Also had several PT-17 Stearmans and a few P-40 Warhawks assigned. Transferred as inactive to the US Army Corps of Engineers on 1 April 1946 with the drawdown of AAFTC's pilot training program.

The airfield was turned over to civil control though the War Assets Administration (WAA).

== See also ==
- Alabama World War II Army Airfields
- List of airports in Alabama
