= Dothan Municipal Airport =

Closed airport in Alabama, United States

Dothan Municipal Airport Napier Army Airfield Auxiliary #2
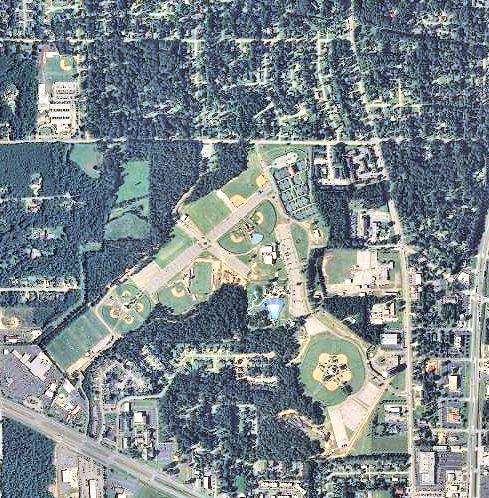
- USGS 2006 orthophoto
- IATA: none; ICAO: none

Summary
- Serves: Dothan, Alabama
- Coordinates: 31°14′24″N 085°26′25″W

Map
- Location of airport in Alabama

Dothan Municipal Airport is a closed airport located 3 miles (5 km) west-northwest of Dothan, Alabama, United States.

== History ==
The original airport in Dothan was built in the 1930s by the Federal Government. It was listed in 1934 as having two sod runways in an "L" shape pattern. The longest runway is 2,100'. By 1937, the runway had been extended to 2,500'. It was served by the Eastern Airlines DC-3 commercial service.

During World War II, the airport was used as an auxiliary training airfield for the Army pilot training school at Napier Army Airfield, and was known as Napier Army Airfield Auxiliary #2. It was one of four auxiliary fields for Napier AAF, and was used by advanced single engine aircraft, including P-40 Warhawk fighters. The Army expanded the facilities at Dothan with three bituminous runways, the longest being the 4,000' northeast/southwest and NNW/SSE strips.

The airfield was said to have a single 80' x 60' steel hangar, to be owned by Houston County and the City of Dothan, and to be operated by the Army Air Forces. After the war ended, the airport was returned to civil control.

The airport was operated until 1966 when it was closed due to urban congestion and all air traffic was moved to the former Napier AAF. Napier Field was less constrained geographically, being located further outside of the town.

The former Dothan Municipal Airport today is now home to Westgate Park, the waterpark "Waterworld", ballfields, and a BMX track. It can clearly be seen in aerial imagery as a former airport.

== See also ==
- Alabama World War II Army Airfields
