= Bay Auxiliary Field =

Retired US air field

Coordinates: 34°42′49″N 087°15′45″W

Bay Auxiliary Field is a former facility of the United States Army Air Forces located in Courtland, Alabama. Constructed after 1941 as an auxiliary to the nearby Courtland Army Air Field, it was converted back into farmland after the war.

== See also ==
- Alabama World War II Army Airfields
- List of airports in Alabama
