= Henderson Airport (Alabama) =

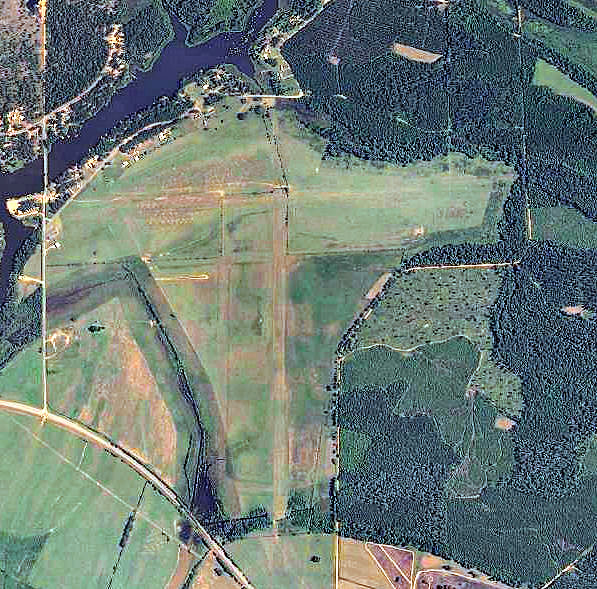
- 2006 USGS airphoto
- IATA: none; ICAO: none

Summary
- Serves: Millers Ferry, Alabama
- Coordinates: 32°07′18″N 087°22′28″W

Map
- Location of Henderson Airport

Henderson Airport is a closed airport located two miles (3.2 km) north-northeast of Millers Ferry, Alabama, United States. During World War II, it operated as Henderson Auxiliary Field.

== History ==
The airport was built in about 1942 as an auxiliary airfield to the Army pilot school at Craig Army Airfield. It was designated Craig Army Auxiliary Airfield #3. It had two 4,000-foot asphalt runways, oriented NNE/SSW & WNW/ESE. The field was said to not have any hangars. It was apparently unmanned unless necessary for aircraft recovery.

It was sold after the war in 1945 and during the postwar years was used as a civil airport. It appears to have been closed by 1960, and has been abandoned ever since.

== See also ==
- Alabama World War II Army Airfields
