= Craig Field (airport) =

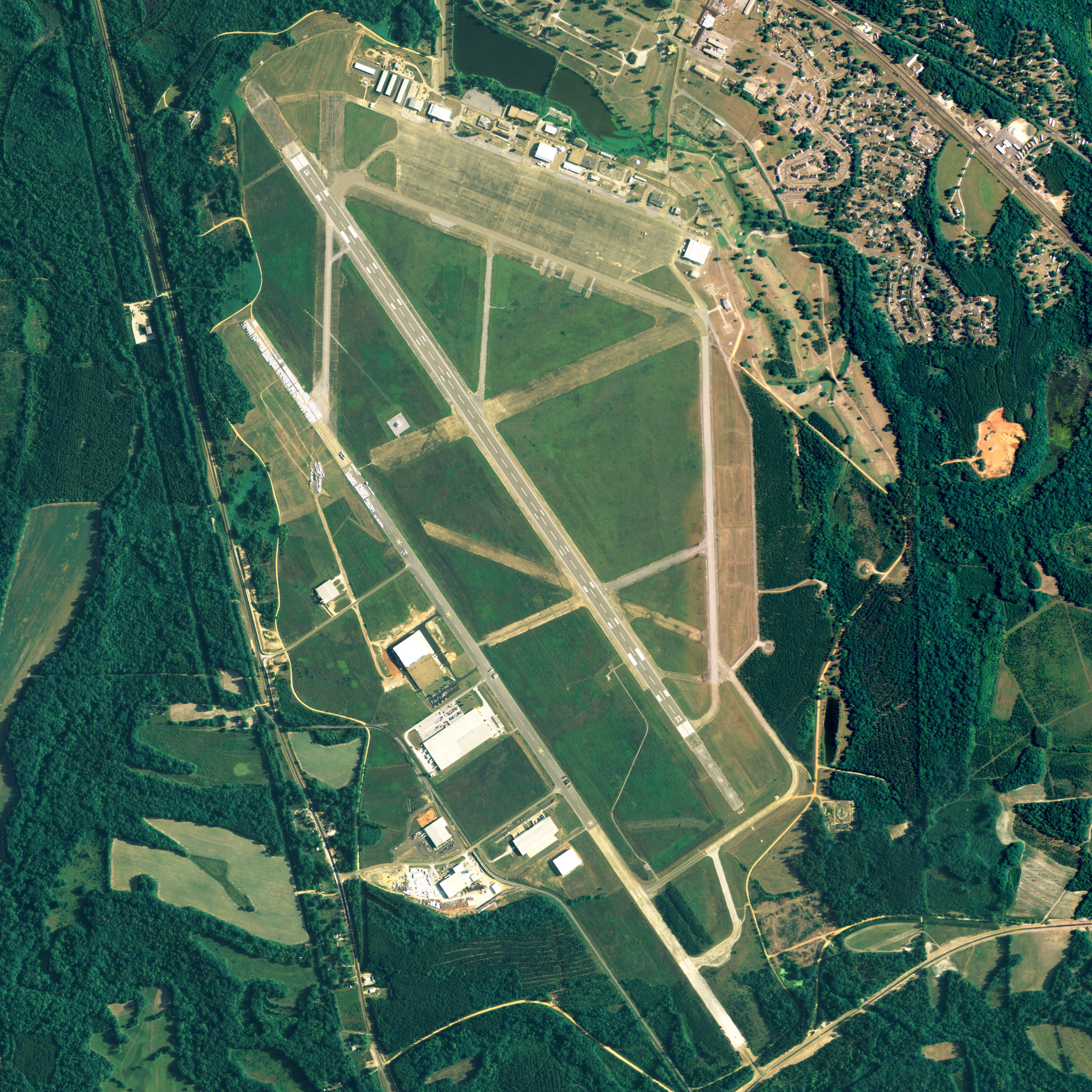
- NAIP image 2006
- IATA: SEM; ICAO: KSEM; FAA LID: SEM

Summary
- Airport type: Public
- Owner: Craig Field Airport & Industrial Authority
- Serves: Selma, Alabama
- Elevation AMSL: 166 ft (51 m)
- Coordinates: 32°20′38″N 086°59′16″W
- Website: www.CraigComplex.com
- Interactive map of Craig Field

Runways
Direction	Length		Surface
Direction	ft	m	Surface
15/33	8,002	2,439	Asphalt/concrete

Statistics (2009)
- Aircraft operations: 38,550
- Based aircraft: 8
- Source: Federal Aviation Administration

Craig Field (IATA: SEM, ICAO: KSEM, FAA LID: SEM) is a public airport four miles southeast of Selma, in Dallas County, Alabama. The FAA's National Plan of Integrated Airport Systems for 2011–2015 categorized it as a general aviation facility. It was previously Craig Air Force Base, an Undergraduate Pilot Training (UPT) base with T-37 Tweet and T-38 Talon aircraft operated by the 29th Flying Training Wing of the U.S. Air Force. Craig AFB was closed in 1977 as part of reduced defense spending and a concurrent post-Vietnam War reduction in force.

== Facilities ==
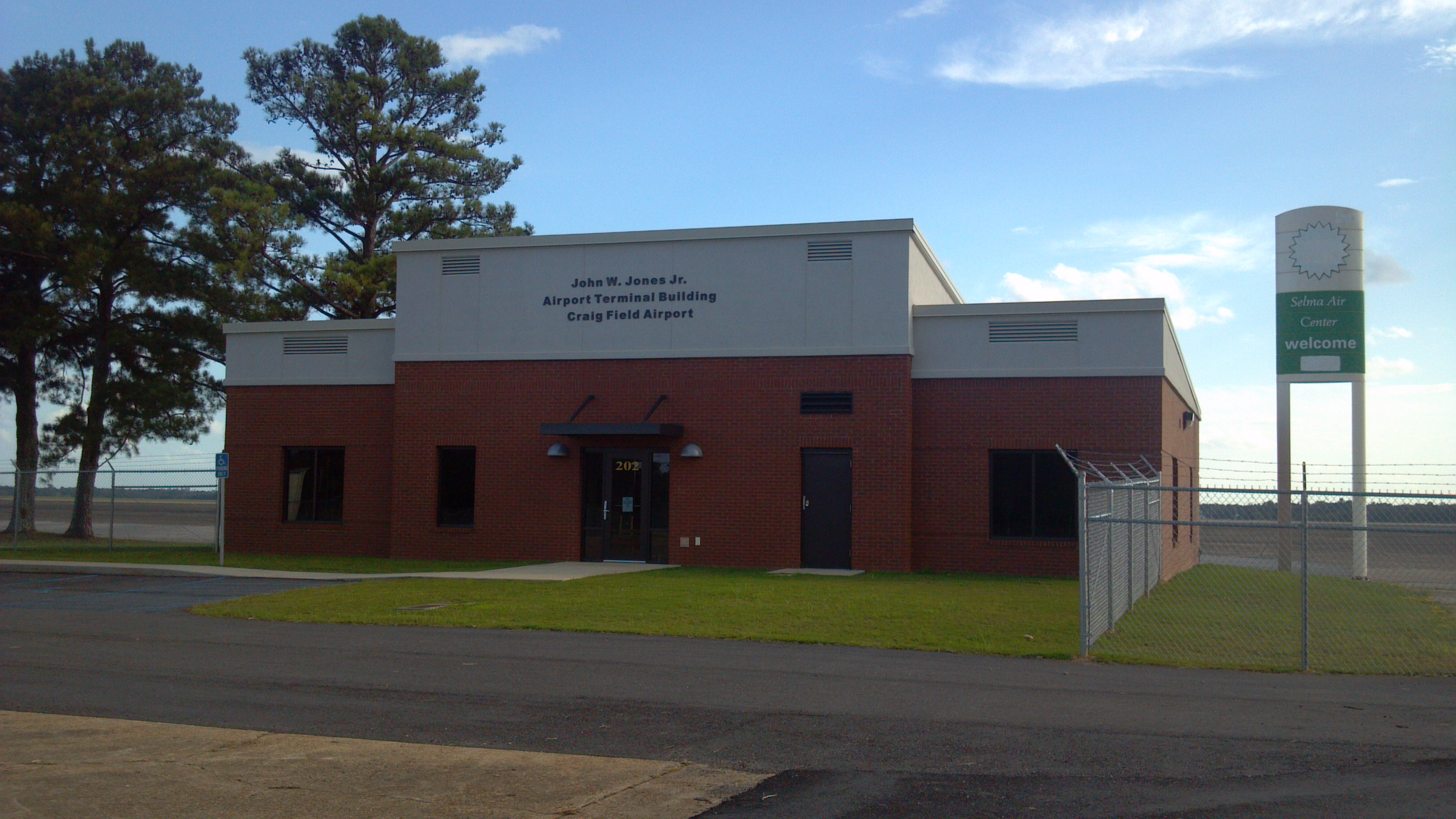
The John W. Jones, Jr. Airport Terminal

Craig Field covers 1,790 acres (720 ha) at an elevation of 166 feet (51 m). Its single operational runway, Rwy 15/33, is 8,002 by 150 feet (2,439 x 46 m) asphalt/concrete. In the year ending November 2, 2009, the airport had 38,550 aircraft operations, an average 105 per day: 89% general aviation, 10% military, and 1% air taxi. Eight single-engine aircraft were then based at the airport.

The former USAF air traffic control tower from what was Craig Air Force Base remains. Air traffic control services returned to Craig Field in 2022, in the form of Advanced ATC, where students and staff provide ATC services Monday through Friday, 0700-1900 Local time. Only one of the original seven runways (15/33) is actively maintained and in use. The Craig VORTAC is no longer in service, however GPS equipped aircraft are able to use the Instrument Landing System (ILS) for Runway 33. The airport's military traffic consists mostly of training aircraft, either fixed-wing aircraft on sorties from nearby Columbus AFB or Naval Air Station Meridian in Mississippi, NAS Pensacola or NAS Whiting Field in Florida, or rotary-wing aircraft from Fort Novosel in Alabama or NAS Whiting Field, Florida.

Prior to its 2007 closure by L3 Corporation, now L3Harris, other military training and operational support airlift aircraft were inbound to the L3 Communications/Vertex Aerospace facility at the airport for contracted maintenance.

The former military family housing was sold to individual owners shortly after base closure and has decayed compared to its previous military occupants.

Multiple civilian government and corporate tenants have taken up residency. The former on-base elementary school continues as the civilian-run Craig Elementary, and the former base golf course continues as the Craig Golf Course and Driving Range. The former Alabama Highway Patrol (AHP) training academy and its headquarters for AHP's F Troop at Craig, is now used by Advanced ATC to train upcoming air traffic controllers via the FAA's new CTO-P program.

In 2015, Marine One used Craig Field when President Barack Obama visited Selma's Edmund Pettus Bridge. Several years later, during Kamala Harris's presidential campaign, she flew into Craig Field and visited local businesses.

Craig Field has never have had airline service; Selma's previous airport, Selma Municipal Airport saw commercial service with Delta Air Lines, then Southern Airways, from 1952 to 1963. When Craig AFB was closed as an active USAF installation, it became the city's airport and Selma Municipal Airport was closed.

== See also ==
- List of airports in Alabama
