= Henderson Auxiliary Field =

Henderson Auxiliary Airfield
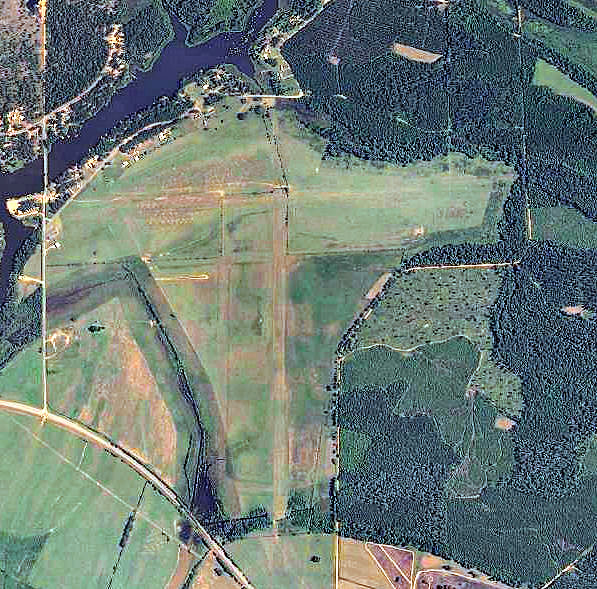
- 2006 USGS airphoto
- IATA: none; ICAO: none

Summary
- Operator: United States Army Air Force
- Location: Millers Ferry, Alabama
- Coordinates: 32°07′18″N 087°22′28″W

Map
- Location of Henderson Auxiliary Field

Henderson Auxiliary Field is a closed facility of the United States Army that is located two miles (3.2 km) north-northeast of Millers Ferry, Alabama. Following its closure, it was reopened as Henderson Airport.

== History ==
The airport was built in about 1942 as an auxiliary airfield to the Army pilot school at Craig Army Airfield. It was designated Craig Army Auxiliary Airfield #3. It had two 4,000-foot asphalt runways, oriented NNE/SSW & WNW/ESE. The field was said to not have any hangars. It was apparently unmanned unless necessary for aircraft recovery.

== See also ==
- Alabama World War II Army Airfields
