= Mollette Auxiliary Field =

Former US Air Force facility

Coordinates: 32°11′40.00″N 87°9′55.00″W

Mollette Auxiliary Field is a former facility of the United States Army Air Forces located in Orrville, Alabama. Constructed after 1941 as an auxiliary to the nearby Craig Field, it was turned back into farmland after the war.

== See also ==
- Alabama World War II Army Airfields
- List of airports in Alabama
