= Selma Municipal Airport =

Selma Municipal Airport Selfield Field
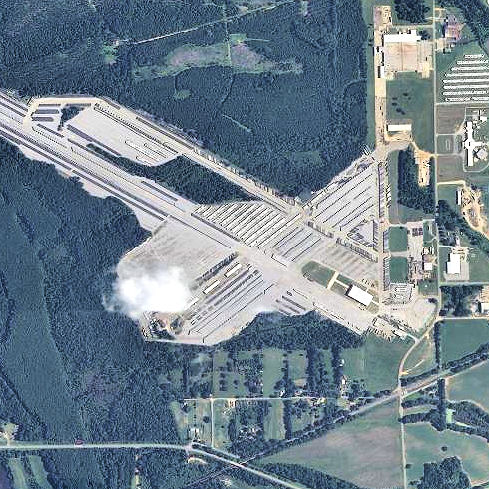
- 2006 USGS photo
- IATA: ~~SES~~; ICAO: none

Summary
- Serves: Selma, Alabama
- Coordinates: 32°26′20″N 086°57′13″W

Map

Selma Municipal Airport (IATA: ~~SES~~) (Selma Selfield Airport) was five miles east-northeast of Selma, Alabama, United States.

== History ==
The field was always closely tied to operations at Craig, and served as an auxiliary field for a number of years during World War II, with the initiation of undergraduate pilot training for the Air Force through the 1960s. Selma Municipal Airport closed in 1978 when the City of Selma relocated the municipal airport to the larger Craig Air Force Base, which was closed by the Air Force after the Vietnam War.

The first airline flights were Delta DC-3s in 1951–52; Southern replaced Delta in 1960 and pulled out around the end of 1963.

Today the former airport is used by the Federal Emergency Management Agency (FEMA) for storage and maintenance of a large number of manufactured housing units to be used as temporary housing for disaster survivors.
