= Weedon Field =

Airport in Alabama, United States

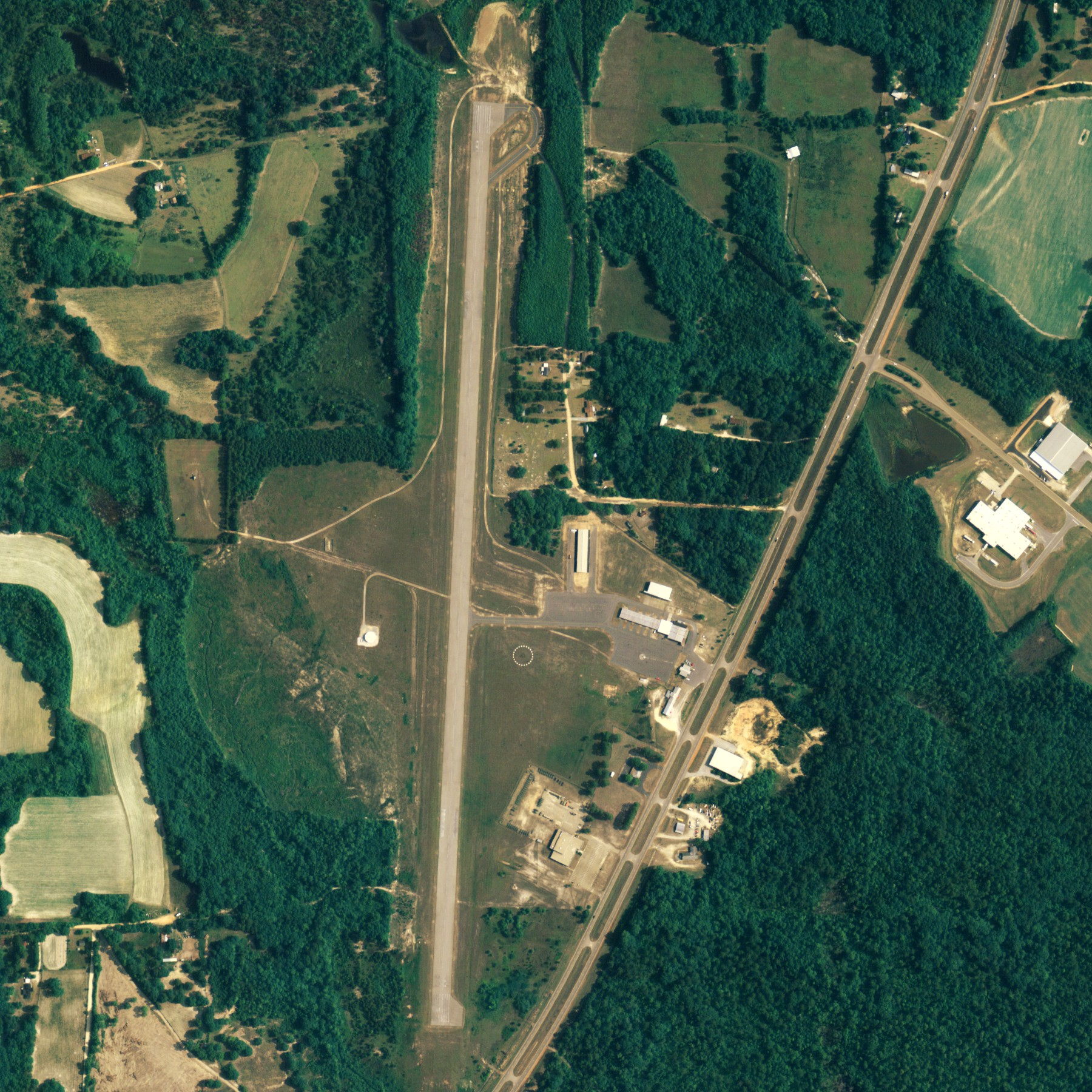
- NAIP aerial image, September 2006
- IATA: EUF; ICAO: KEUF; FAA LID: EUF

Summary
- Airport type: Public
- Owner: City of Eufaula
- Serves: Eufaula, Alabama
- Elevation AMSL: 285 ft (87 m)
- Coordinates: 31°57′05″N 085°07′44″W

Map
- Location of airport in Alabama EUF (the United States)

Runways
| Direction | Length | | Surface |
| Direction | ft | m | Surface |
|---|---|---|---|
| 18/36 | 5,000 | 1,524 | Asphalt |

Statistics (2017)
- Aircraft operations: 36,638
- Based aircraft: 27
- Source: Federal Aviation Administration

Weedon Field (IATA: EUF, ICAO: KEUF, FAA LID: EUF) is a city-owned, public-use airport located three nautical miles (4 mi, 6 km) north of the central business district of Eufaula, a city in Barbour County, Alabama, United States.

This airport is included in the FAA's National Plan of Integrated Airport Systems for 2011–2015 and 2009–2013, both of which categorized it as a general aviation facility.

== Facilities and aircraft ==
Weedon Field covers an area of 208 acres (84 ha) at an elevation of 285 feet (87 m) above mean sea level. It has one runway designated 18/36 with an asphalt surface measuring 5,000 by 100 feet (1,524 x 30 m).

For the 12-month period ending November 10, 2010, the airport had 36,638 aircraft operations, an average of 100 per day: 74% general aviation and 26% military. At that time there were 18 aircraft based at this airport: 61% single-engine, 6% multi-engine, 6% jet, 6% helicopter and 22% ultralight.

== See also ==
- List of airports in Alabama
