= Henderson Field =

Henderson Field is the name of several airports:

- Henderson Field (Guadalcanal), a former military airfield on Guadalcanal Island in the Solomon Islands
- Henderson Field (Midway) (originally Naval Air Station Midway Islands), a former World War II airfield on East Midway Island
- Henderson Field (Midway Atoll) on Sand Island in Midway Atoll, an unincorporated territory of the United States.
- Henderson Field (North Carolina) in Wallace, North Carolina, United States.
