= Demopolis Municipal Airport =

Demopolis Regional Airport Demopolis Municipal Airport Julian D. "Buzz" Sawyer Airport
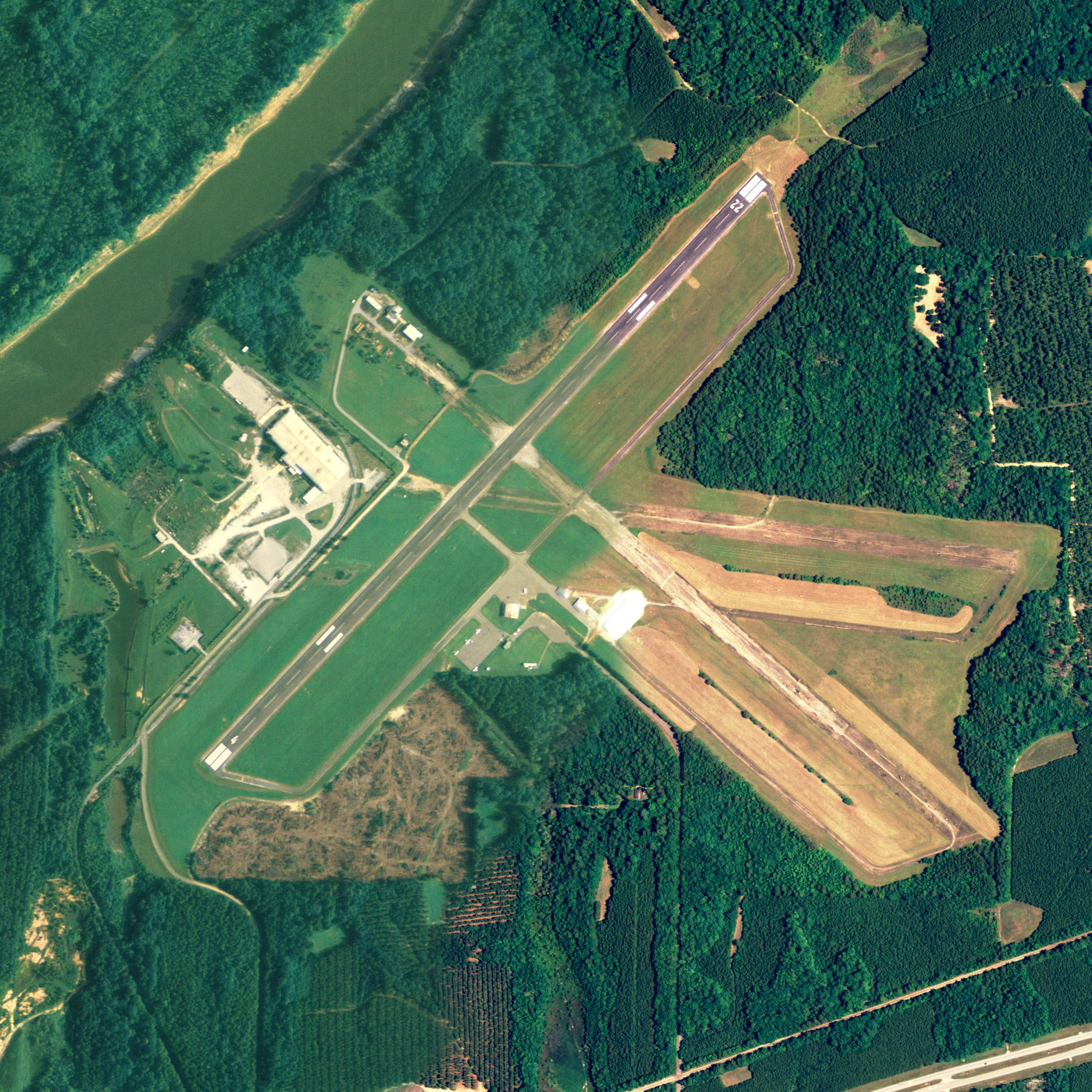
- NAIP aerial image, August 18, 2006
- IATA: none; ICAO: KDYA; FAA LID: DYA

Summary
- Airport type: Public
- Owner: City of Demopolis
- Serves: Demopolis, Alabama, U.S.
- Location: Marengo County, Alabama
- Elevation AMSL: 112 ft (34 m)
- Coordinates: 32°27′50″N 087°57′15″W

Map
- Location of airport in Alabama DYA (the United States)

Runways
Direction	Length		Surface
Direction	ft	m	Surface
4/22	5,002	1,525	Asphalt

Statistics (2017)
- Aircraft operations (2016): 5,250
- Based aircraft: 21
- Source: Federal Aviation Administration

Demopolis Regional Airport (ICAO: KDYA, FAA LID: DYA, formerly 7A2) is a city-owned, public-use airport located six nautical miles (7 mi, 11 km) southwest of the central business district of Demopolis, a city in Marengo County, Alabama, United States. It is also known as Demopolis Municipal Airport and Julian D. "Buzz" Sawyer Airport.

This airport is included in the FAA's National Plan of Integrated Airport Systems for 2011–2015 and 2009–2013, both of which categorized it as a general aviation facility.

This airport is assigned a three-letter location identifier of DYA by the Federal Aviation Administration, but it does not have an International Air Transport Association (IATA) airport code.

== History ==
During World War II the airfield was built by the United States Army Air Forces and opened in October 1943 as Demopolis Army Airfield. The airfield was returned to civil control in 1946.

== Facilities and aircraft ==
The airport covers an area of 438 acres (177 ha) at an elevation of 112 feet (34 m) above mean sea level. It has one runway designated 4/22 with an asphalt surface measuring 5,002 by 100 feet (1,525 x 30 m).

For the 12-month period ending September 28, 2016, the airport had 5,250 aircraft operations, an average of 14 per day: 99% general aviation and 1% military. At that time there were 18 aircraft based at this airport: 16 single-engine and 2 multi-engine.

== See also ==
- List of airports in Alabama
