= Sharpe Field =

Sharpe Field Tuskegee Army Airfield
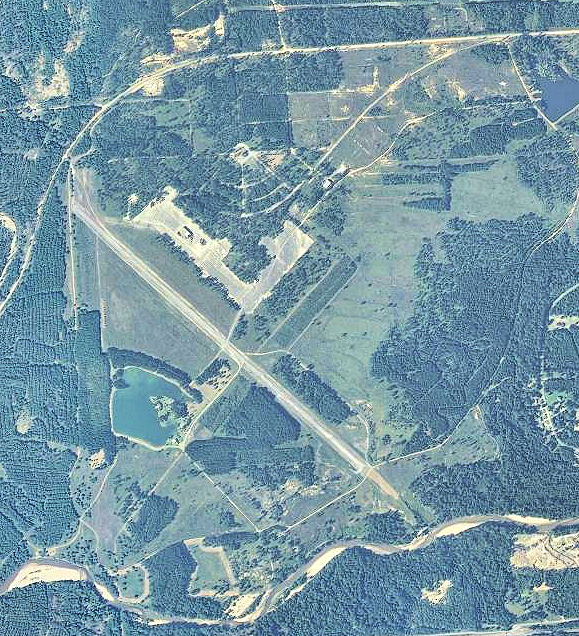
- 2006 USGS airphoto

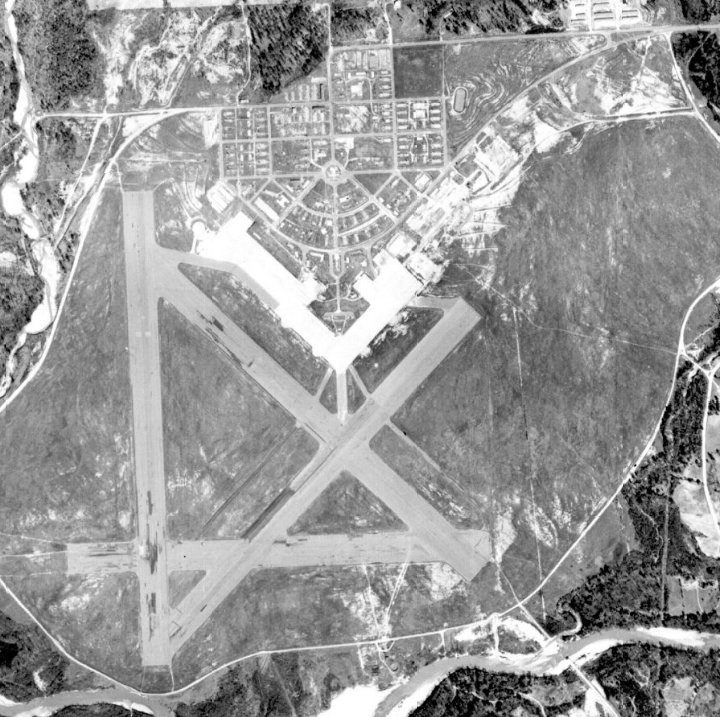
- Tuskegee Army Airfield – 27 February 1950
- IATA: ~~TGE~~; ICAO: none; FAA LID: ~~AL73~~

Summary
- Airport type: Closed
- Owner: Bradbury Family Partnership
- Location: Tuskegee, Alabama
- Elevation AMSL: 253 ft (77 m)
- Coordinates: 32°29′31″N 85°46′32″W

Map
- Location of Sharpe Field ~~KLUL~~ (the United States)

Runways
Direction	Length		Surface
Direction	ft	m	Surface
14/32	5,300	1,615	Asphalt
- Source: Federal Aviation Administration

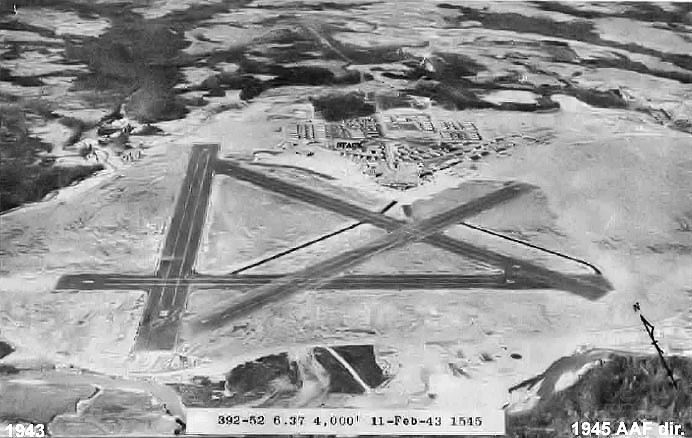
Tuskegee Army Airfield, 11 February 1943

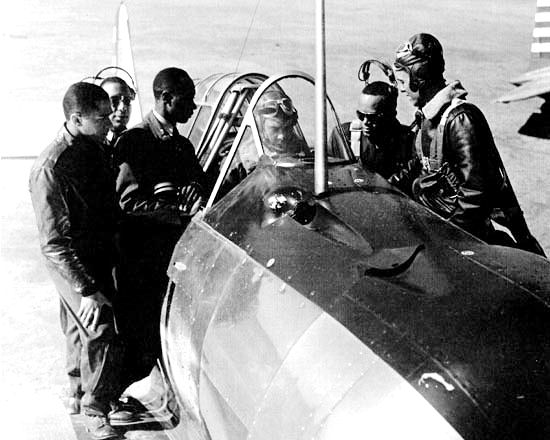
The first graduates of the Advanced Flying school on a BT-13 basic training aircraft

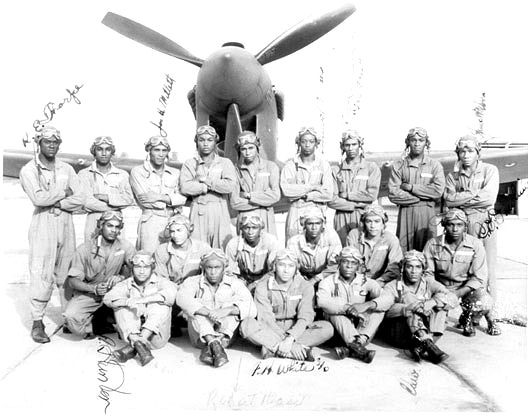
Official US Army Air Force Training Command photograph of 20 Tuskegee Airmen posing in front of a P-40

Sharpe Field (IATA: TGE, FAA LID: AL73) is a closed private-use airport located six nautical miles (11 km; 6.9 mi) northwest of the central business district of Tuskegee, a city in Macon County, Alabama, United States. This airport is privately owned by the Bradbury Family Partnership.

Formerly known as Tuskegee Army Airfield, Sharpe Field was used to train the Tuskegee Airmen during World War II. It provided advanced training for the graduates of nearby Moton Field. Most of the history of the Tuskegee Airmen was made at this site.

== History ==
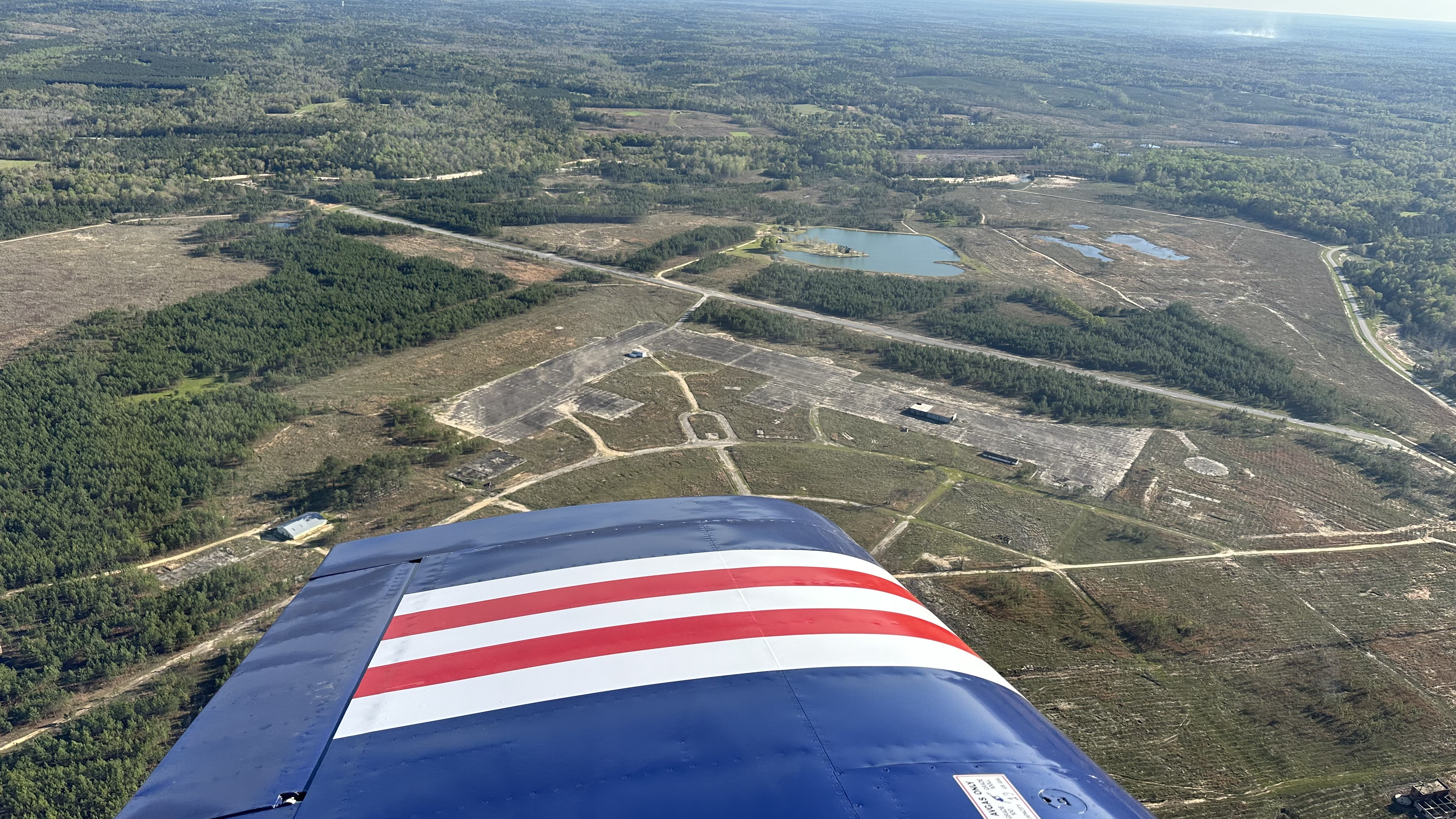
Sharpe Field - March 2024

=== World War II ===
The airfield was designed by the African American architect Hilyard Robinson and built in 1941. Construction began on July 12, 1941. Training flights began in November of the same year, even though construction was nowhere near completion. A graded (but not yet paved) portion of the north–south runway was used to conduct initial flight training.

On 23 July 1941 the Air Corps established an Air Corps Advanced Flying School at Tuskegee; it was activated two weeks later, on 6 August. It was later renamed the Tuskegee Advanced Flying School; the Army Air Forces Advanced Flying School; and the Army Air Forces Pilot School (Basic-Advanced).

Tuskegee AAF was assigned to the Southeast Training Center of the Army Air Force Training Command. It was commanded by the 318th Army Air Force Base Unit. By the end of 1942, Tuskegee had a total of 3,414 personnel.

The March 1943 14M Regional Aeronautical Chart labeled the airfield as "Tuskegee Army Flying School" and indicated that the field had a control tower. By September 1943, Tuskegee had 4 runways & a total of 225 buildings. In addition to the main airfield, known sub-bases and auxiliaries which supported pilot training were:

- Griel Auxiliary Field 32°28′48″N 85°53′24″W
- Shorter Auxiliary Field 32°25′30″N 85°57′30″W

Aircraft used at Tuskegee during World War II included the PT-17 biplane primary trainer, BT-13 monoplane basic trainer, AT-6 Texan advanced trainer, and P-40 Warhawk (used for fighter transition training).

The first class of African-American aviation cadets entered the second phase of military flight training (Basic) at Tuskegee AAF on 8 November 1941, under military instructors. Only 7 of the 13 original cadets remained. The 99th Pursuit Squadron moved to Tuskegee from Maxwell Field, Alabama on 5 January 1942. The Air Base Detachment would later be redesignated as the 318th Air Base Squadron and still later as the 318th Base Headquarters and Air Base Squadron.

Five of the aviation cadets at Tuskegee entered advanced flying training with P-40 Warhawks in January 1942. The 100th Pursuit Squadron was activated at Tuskegee on 19 February 1942. It was the second African-American Army Air Forces unit ever to be activated. The first class of African-American pilots at Tuskegee completed advanced pilot training on 7 March. There were only five of class 42-C-SE who completed the training and they were Capt. Benjamin O. Davis, Jr. and second lieutenants George S. Roberts, Charles H. DeBow, Jr., Mac Ross, and Lemuel R. Custis. On 17 April the Air Corps Advanced Flying School at Tuskegee Army Air Field was redesignated as Tuskegee Advanced Flying School. The second class 42-D-SE consisting of three African-American pilots, Charles Dryden, Sydney Brooks, and Clarence Jamerson graduated as second lieutenants from flying training on 29 April. By the end of 1942, nine classes of African-American pilots had completed training at Tuskegee AAF.

On 13 October 1942 the 332d Fighter Group was activated at Tuskegee, and the pre-existing 100th Fighter Squadron was assigned to it. The 301st and 302d Fighter Squadrons were also activated for the first time at Tuskegee, and assigned to the 332d Fighter Group. This group was the first African-American group in the Army Air Forces. On 23 March 1943, the group departed Tuskegee for Selfridge Field, Michigan, where they received air combat training by First Air Force and eventually were deployed overseas for combat operations in Italy.

Twin-engine training commenced at Tuskegee in 1943, at first using the AT-10. The 1944 US Army/Navy Directory of Airfields described Tuskegee AAF as having a 5,000' hard-surface runway. As constructed during World War II, Tuskegee AAF consisted of four asphalt runways (the longest being 5,200'), taxiways, a ramp, and a large number of buildings north of the field. The AT-10 twin-engine trainer was replaced at Tuskegee by the TB-25 Mitchell in 1945. The last pilot class graduated at Tuskegee in June of 1946, bringing the total number of pilots trained at the base to 992.

Tuskegee AAF was inactivated in 1946, and the property reverted to the town of Tuskegee. Many of the base's buildings were moved into the town, and two of the hangars were relocated.

== Postwar use ==
Although the 1962 Birmingham Sectional Chart depicted Sharpe Field as having 4 paved runways (with the longest being 5,000'), the Aerodromes table included the remark "North/South only usable runway."

Sharpe Field was reopened as a civilian airport at some point between 1945 and 1962, as that is how it was listed in the 1962 AOPA Airport Directory. Sharpe Field was described as having a single 5,000' asphalt Runway 18/36, and the operator was listed as Sharpe Aviation Service.

The Tuskegee airfield was evidently closed once again at some point between 1965 and 1971, as it was not listed among active airfields in the 1971 Flight Guide.

In 1976, an attempt was made to reuse the abandoned base as an oil refinery, but this did not work out. It was depicted as an abandoned airfield on the 1998 World Aeronautical Chart.

In 2019 Sharpe Field was used to test a blimp deployment of FirstNet. The field's current state was seen in a commercial by AT&T .

== Current status ==
The site of Tuskegee AAF was purchased by the Bradbury Family Partnership around 2000. It is strictly a private development. However, in 2003, Sharpe Field was once again listed as an active private airfield. Only one runway was listed as being active, the 5,300' asphalt Runway 14/32. The airfield is currently closed and has been deactivated. The owner was listed as the Bradbury Family Partnership of Woodstock, Georgia.

The purpose of the airfield having been reactivated is unknown, although the old ramp area was used as an asphalt plant for a number of years. Some of the equipment can still be seen on the ramp area.

== Facilities ==
Sharpe Field covers an area of 2,600 acres (1,100 ha) at an elevation of 253 feet (77 m) above mean sea level. It has one asphalt paved runway designated 14/32 which measures 5,300 by 46 feet (1,615 x 14 m).

== See also ==
- Alabama World War II Army Airfields
- 28th Flying Training Wing (World War II)
- Tuskegee Airmen National Historic Site
