= Courtland Airport =

Airport in Alabama, United States

Courtland Airport Lawrence County Airport
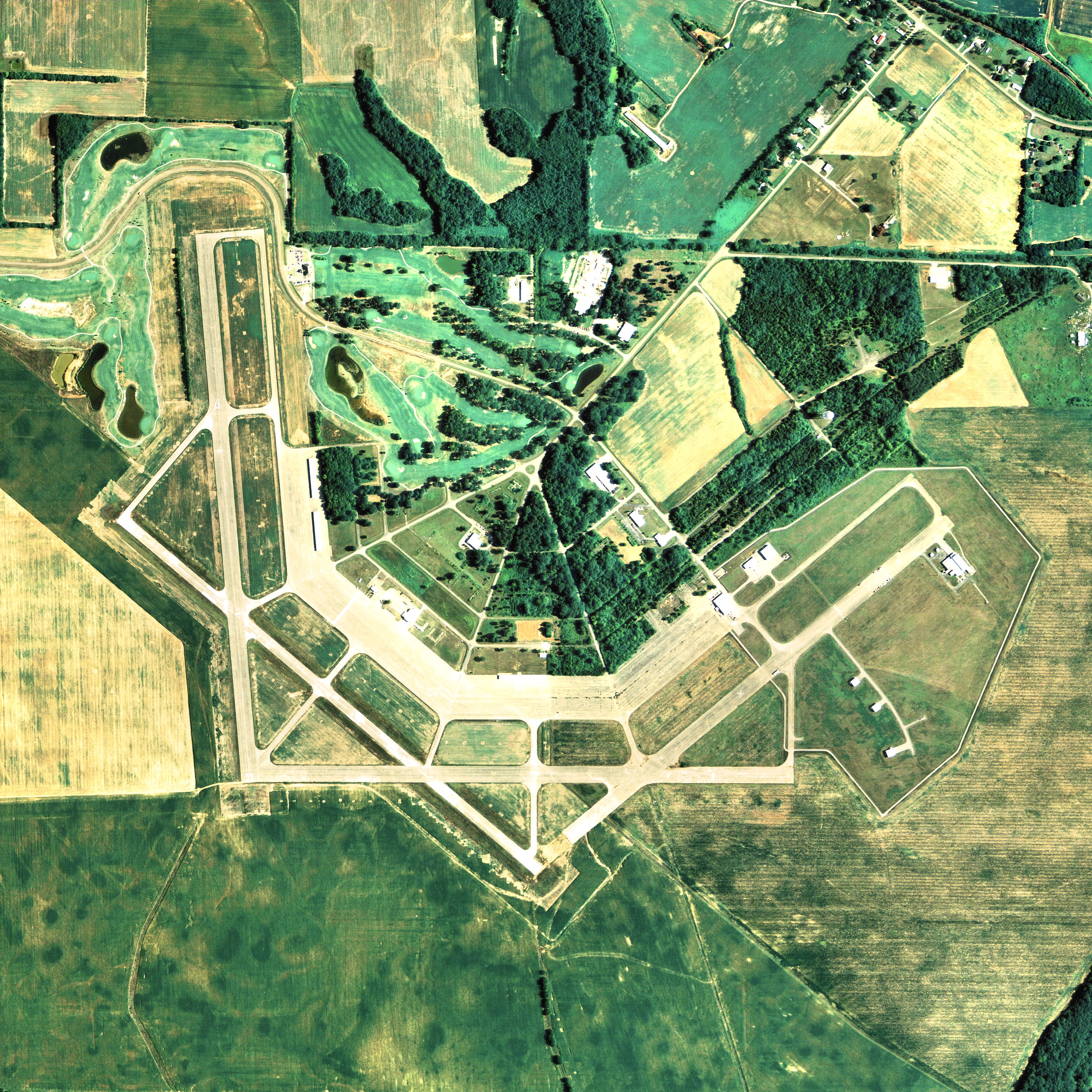
- NAIP aerial image, 29 June 2006
- IATA: none; ICAO: none; FAA LID: 9A4

Summary
- Airport type: Public
- Owner: Lawrence County Commission
- Serves: Courtland, Alabama
- Elevation AMSL: 588 ft (179 m)
- Coordinates: 34°39′34″N 087°20′56″W

Map
- Location of airport in Alabama 9A4 (the United States)

Runways
Direction	Length		Surface
Direction	ft	m	Surface
13/31	4,994	1,522	Concrete
18/36	4,994	1,522	Concrete

Statistics (2017)
- Aircraft operations (2016): 11,900
- Based aircraft: 46
- Source: Federal Aviation Administration

Courtland Airport (FAA LID: 9A4) is a public-use airport located two nautical miles (4 km) northeast of the central business district of Courtland, a town in Lawrence County, Alabama, United States. It is owned by the Lawrence County Commission and was formerly known as Lawrence County Airport.

This airport is included in the FAA's National Plan of Integrated Airport Systems for 2011–2015 and 2009–2013, both of which categorized it as a general aviation facility.

== History ==
see Courtland Army Airfield for the World War II history of the facility

Following the onset of World War II, the United States Army set goals to train tens of thousands of pilots per year. It was recognized that to achieve this, many new training fields would have to be constructed - hundreds across the country. Due to the climate allowing year-round flight instruction, as well as the low airways congestion, North Alabama was considered to be a good location for one of the new Army Air Force training fields. Following a review by a site selection board, Courtland was chosen to receive this facility. It was considered the best overall site of three evaluated within the North Alabama region.

As training needs decreased toward the end of the war, training air fields were deactivated across the country. Courtland Army Airfield was one of these, it being deactivated in June 1945. At the end of the war the airfield was determined to be excess by the War Department in 1946 and was excessed. The site was returned to the State of Alabama by quitclaim deed in 1948.

With regard to the original structures, most everything but the runways, and several concrete slabs with three or four wide concrete steps are gone now. A steel-framed aircraft hangar that was once used at Courtland still exists and is still in use, but is no longer located at the Courtland site. This structure was disassembled and moved to the Birmingham Municipal Airport (now Birmingham International Airport) during the early 1950s.

Lockheed Martin and other light industries call the Lawrence County Industrial Airpark site home today.

A golf course also hugs the northeast to west perimeter.

== Facilities and aircraft ==
Courtland Airport covers an area of 350 acres (142 ha) at an elevation of 588 feet (179 m) above mean sea level. It has two runways, 13/31 and 17/35, each with a concrete surface measuring 4,994 by 150 feet (1,522 x 46 m).

For the 12-month period ending April 14, 2010, the airport had 11,900 aircraft operations, an average of 32 per day: 92% general aviation and 8% military. At that time there were 32 aircraft based at this airport: 81% single-engine and 19% multi-engine.

== See also ==
- List of airports in Alabama
