= Thomas C. Russell Field =

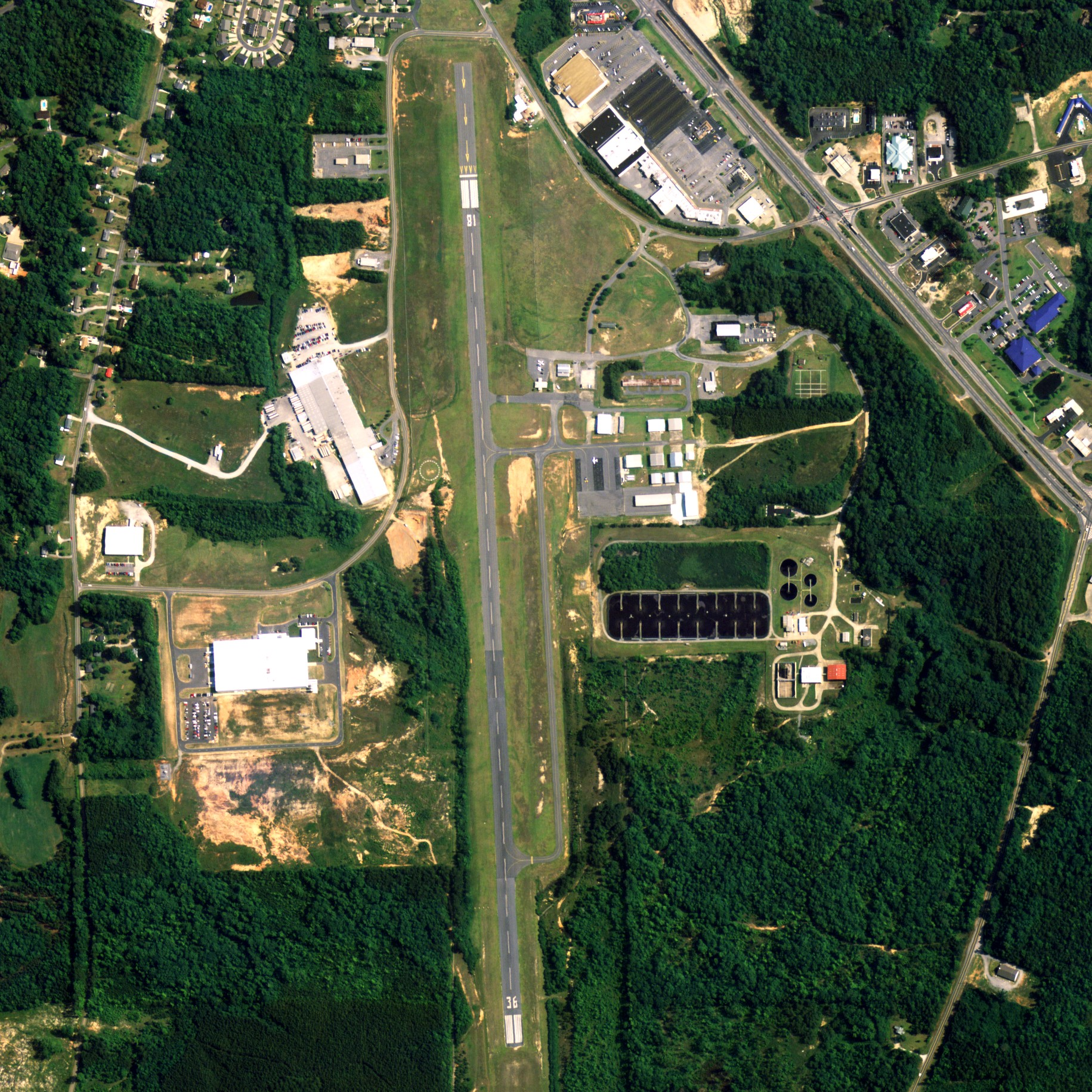
- NAIP aerial image, 30 June 2006
- IATA: ALX; ICAO: KALX; FAA LID: ALX

Summary
- Airport type: Public
- Owner: City of Alexander City
- Serves: Alexander City, Alabama
- Elevation AMSL: 686 ft / 209 m
- Coordinates: 32°54′53″N 085°57′47″W
- Website: AlexanderCityOnline.com/...

Map
- Location of airport in Alabama ALX (the United States)

Runways
Direction	Length		Surface
Direction	ft	m	Surface
18/36	5,422	1,653	Asphalt

Statistics (2019)
- Aircraft operations (year ending 10/7/2019): 33,312
- Based aircraft: 21
- Source: Federal Aviation Administration

Thomas C. Russell Field (IATA: ALX, ICAO: KALX, FAA LID: ALX) is a city-owned public-use airport located two nautical miles (4 km) southwest of the central business district of Alexander City, a city in Tallapoosa County, Alabama, United States.

This airport is included in the FAA's National Plan of Integrated Airport Systems for 2011–2015 and 2009–2013, both of which categorized it as a general aviation facility.

== Facilities and aircraft ==
Thomas C. Russell Field covers an area of 293 acres (119 ha) at an elevation of 686 feet (209 m) above mean sea level. It has one runway designated 18/36 with an asphalt surface measuring 5,422 by 96 feet (1,653 x 29 m).

For the 12-month period ending October 7, 2019, the airport had 33,312 aircraft operations, an average of 91 per day: 91% general aviation and 9% military. At that time there were 21 aircraft based at this airport: 15 single-engine, 5 multi-engine and 1 jet.

== See also ==
- List of airports in Alabama
