= Moton Field Municipal Airport =

Airport in Macon County, Alabama, US

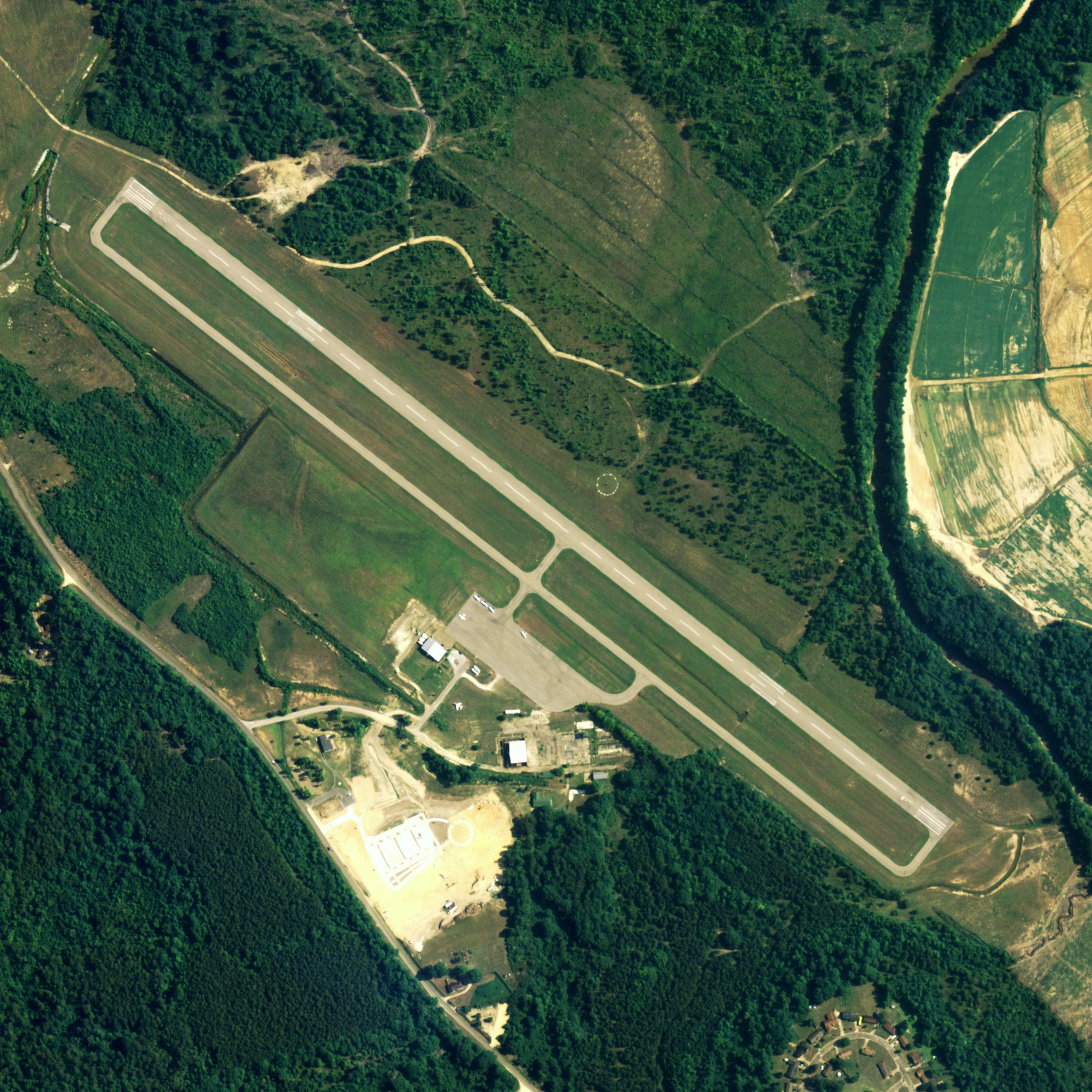
- NAIP aerial image, 2006
- IATA: none; ICAO: none; FAA LID: 06A

Summary
- Airport type: Public
- Owner: City of Tuskegee
- Serves: Tuskegee, Alabama
- Elevation AMSL: 264 ft / 80 m
- Coordinates: 32°27′38″N 085°40′48″W
- Interactive map of Moton Field Municipal Airport

Runways
Direction	Length		Surface
Direction	ft	m	Surface
13/31	5,005	1,526	Asphalt

Statistics (2009)
- Aircraft operations: 19,530
- Based aircraft: 9
- Source: Federal Aviation Administration

Moton Field Municipal Airport (FAA LID: 06A) is a public-use airport located three nautical miles (3.5 mi; 5.6 km) north of the central business district of Tuskegee, a city in Macon County, Alabama, United States. The airport is owned by the City of Tuskegee. It is included in the FAA's National Plan of Integrated Airport Systems for 2011–2015, which categorized it as a general aviation facility.

Moton Field is home to the Tuskegee Airmen National Historic Site.

== Facilities and aircraft ==
Moton Field Municipal Airport covers an area of 275 acres (111 ha) at an elevation of 264 feet (80 m) above mean sea level. It has one runway designated 13/31 with an asphalt surface measuring 5,005 by 100 feet (1,526 by 30 m).

For the 12-month period ending December 9, 2009, the airport had 19,530 general aviation aircraft operations, an average of 53 per day. At that time there were 9 aircraft based at this airport: 100% single-engine.

== See also ==
- Alabama World War II Army Airfields
- List of airports in Alabama
