= VAW-11 =

Carrier Airborne Early Warning Squadron 11
- Active: 6 July 1948 – 20 April 1967
- Country: United States
- Branch: United States Navy
- Type: airborne early warning
- Size: Squadron
- Nickname: "Early Elevens”
- Engagements: Korean War; Vietnam War

Aircraft flown
- Electronic warfare: TBM-3W Avenger; AD-3/4/5W Skyraider; TF-1Q Trader; E-1 Tracer; E-2 Hawkeye

Carrier Airborne Early Warning Squadron 11 (VAW-11), nicknamed the "Early Elevens", was an airborne early warning squadron, whose mission was to provide services to fleet forces and shore warning networks, under all weather conditions. The squadron was also responsible for combat air patrol and Anti-submarine warfare (ASW) missions. It was based at NAS North Island in San Diego, California, but had detachments serving aboard 13 attack carriers and antisubmarine carriers in the Pacific Fleet.

== Squadron History ==
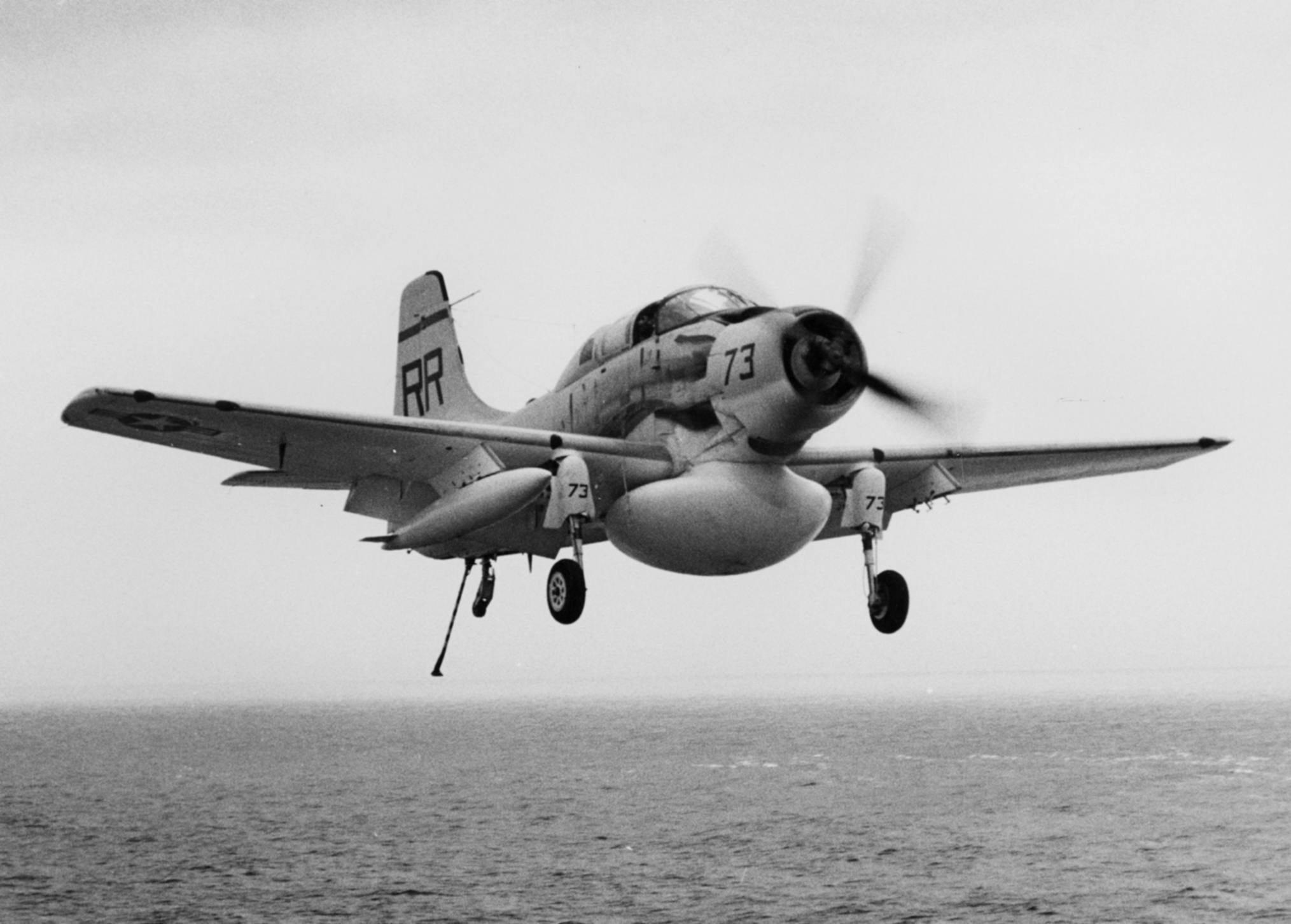
AD-5W VAW-11 approaching USS Bennington

In 1948, the squadron was established as VAW-1, then redesignated Fleet Composite Squadron 11 (VC-11) one month later. The squadron was first equipped with the Grumman TBM-3W Avenger. VC-11 worked on developing the airborne early warning (AEW) concept, and in 1950 deployed detachments that provided ASW and AEW protection throughout the Korean War, flying the Douglas AD-3W/4W Skyraider. These were later replaced by the AD-5W model of the Skyraider. In 1958, the squadron received the AD-5Q variant of the Skyraider and Grumman TF-1Q Trader aircraft, which jointly added electronic warfare to its capabilities. Both aircraft were later employed by VAW-13, which was trained by VAW-11 and commissioned in 1961. In 1959 the squadron received Grumman WF-2 Tracer, commonly known as "Willy Fudds" or "Stoof with a Roof" (as it was developed from the Grumman S2F "Stoof"). In July 1960, it deployed its first Grumman Tracer detachment to the Western Pacific.

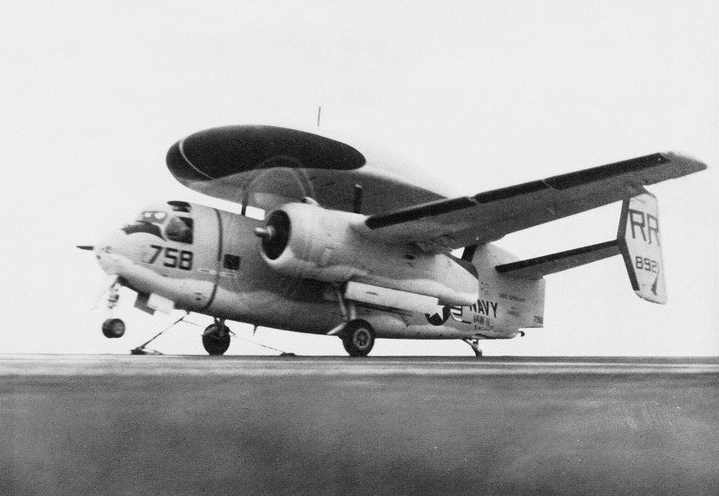
E-1B of VAW-11 prepares to launch from USS Oriskany in 1962

In 1962, the AD-5W was redesignated EA-1E and the WF-2 became the E-1B. In early 1964, the squadron began receiving Grumman E-2A Hawkeye. This aircraft required very extensive ground support, particularly for its complex avionics system, causing the squadron to grow significantly in maintenance inventory and headcount. By 1966, VAW-11 had become the U.S. Navy's largest carrier-based squadron, providing E-2A detachments to large attack carriers and E-1B detachments to smaller Essex-class aircraft carriers. To increase efficiency and combat readiness, on 20 April 1967, the squadron was redesignated as Carrier Airborne Early Warning Wing 11 while the various detachments were established as separate individual VAW squadrons designated VAW-111, VAW-112, VAW-113, VAW-114, VAW-115 and VAW-116.

== See also ==
- History of the United States Navy
- List of inactive United States Navy aircraft squadrons
