= Lorient South Brittany Airport =

Airport in the Brittany region of France

Lorient South Brittany Airport (Lann Bihoué) Aéroport de Lorient Bretagne Sud
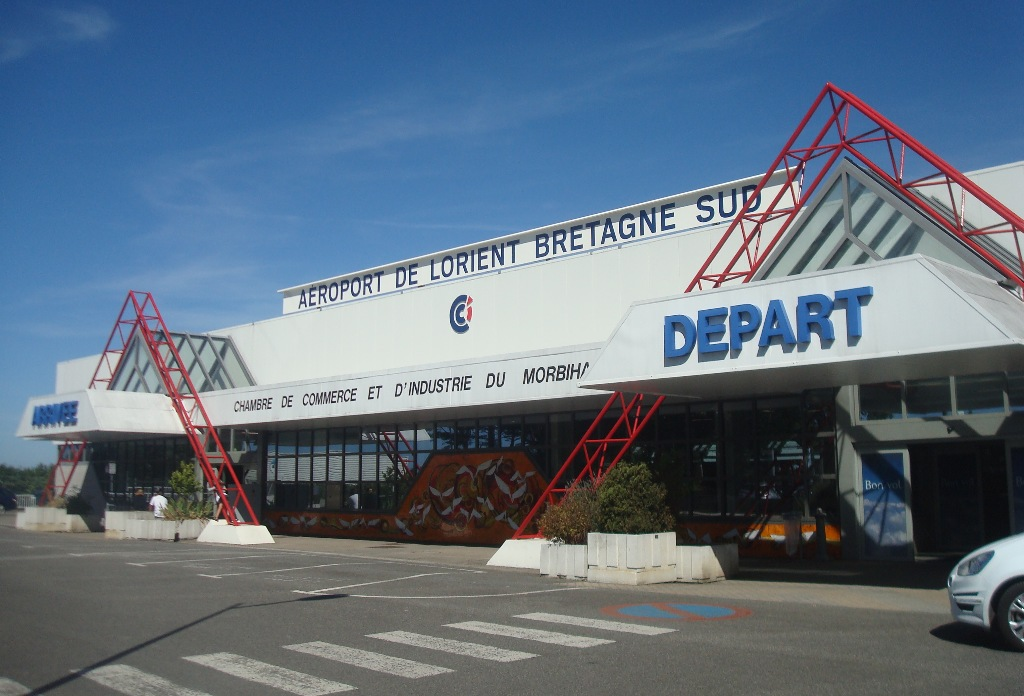
- IATA: LRT; ICAO: LFRH

Summary
- Airport type: Joint mil-civ airfield
- Operator: Morbihan Chamber of Commerce and Industry; Fleet Air Arm
- Serves: Lorient, France
- Elevation AMSL: 160 ft (49 m)
- Coordinates: 47°45′38″N 03°26′24″W
- Website: www.lorient.aeroport.fr

Map
- Location of the airport in Brittany LFRH (France)

Runways
Direction	Length		Surface
Direction	m	ft	Surface
02/20	1,670	5,479	Asphalt
07/25	2,403	7,883	Asphalt
- Source: French AIP and airport website

Lorient South Brittany Airport or Aéroport de Lorient Bretagne Sud (IATA: LRT, ICAO: LFRH) (Breton: Aerborzh an Oriant Su-Breizh), also known as Lorient-Lann-Bihoué Airport, is the airport serving the city of Lorient.

It is situated 5 km west-northwest of Lorient, a commune of the Morbihan département in the Brittany region of France.

The airport is entirely managed by the equipment management company Edeis Concessions.

== History ==
The Lann-Bihoué airfield comprises both a civil airport, open to domestic and international commercial traffic and a military facility: the Lann-Bihoué Naval Aviation Base (established in 1938), which is the second-largest military airbase in France and the largest naval aviation base in Europe · .

Lorient-Lann-Bihoué Airport opened to commercial traffic in 1946 and played a role in ending the isolation of the Brittany region, beginning on February 13, 1961, with the first scheduled flight to Paris, operated by TAI on behalf of Air Inter using a Douglas DC-3 · .

This historic route, which served as the backbone of the site’s operations, saw the passage of many flagship aircraft from regional aviation—ranging from the turboprops of Rousseau Aviation (such as the Nord 262 and HS-748) to the jets flown by Air Inter, Air France, Brit Air, and Hop! Air France (including the Caravelle, Mercure 100, Airbus A320, Boeing 737, Fokker 100, CRJ-1000, ERJ 145, and Embraer 170). Beyond its connection to the capital, the facility has hosted a diverse range of activities, welcoming notable figures, such as General de Gaulle and Pope John Paul II as well as serving as the site for unique logistical operations, including the launch of the Renault 5 in 1972.

Despite a record-breaking 253,000 passengers in 1990 and the introduction of both scheduled and seasonal routes to destinations such as Lyon, Belle-Île-en-Mer, Switzerland, Ireland, London and Porto, the airport eventually faced stiff competition from the TGV high-speed rail network and the 2020 health crisis. This culminated in the permanent withdrawal of Air France in March 2021, ending a 60-year presence. Today, only one scheduled route to Toulouse remains.

Currently managed by the Edeis group, the airport is seeking to diversify its operations by focusing on business aviation, specialized transport for seafarers, and travel for sports teams (such as football or rugby clubs). Edeis also aims to revive charter flights, echoing the airport’s past.

== Airlines and destinations ==
The following airline operates regular scheduled and charter flights at Lorient Airport:

Airlines	Destinations
APG Airlines	Toulouse

== Military use ==
The airport is comparatively large, 3 km by 3 km, which is due to its being built during the Second World War to support German submarine operations from the nearby base in Lorient.

It is also known as Lann Bihoue Naval Air Base (Base Aéronavale de Lann Bihoué) and is one of the French Naval Aviation bases, currently hosting:

- Flottille 4F with Grumman E-2C Hawkeye
- Flottille 21F with Atlantique 2
- Flottille 23F with Atlantique 2
- Flottille 24F with Falcon 50 M
- Flottille 28F with Embraer Xingu

These units also form the airwing which is assigned to the aircraft carrier Charles de Gaulle.

== Accidents ==
- On 30 July 1998 Proteus Airlines Flight 706 collided with a Cessna after flying off-course on approach to the airport, leading to the deaths of the people on both planes.
