= AN/APY-9 =

Military radar

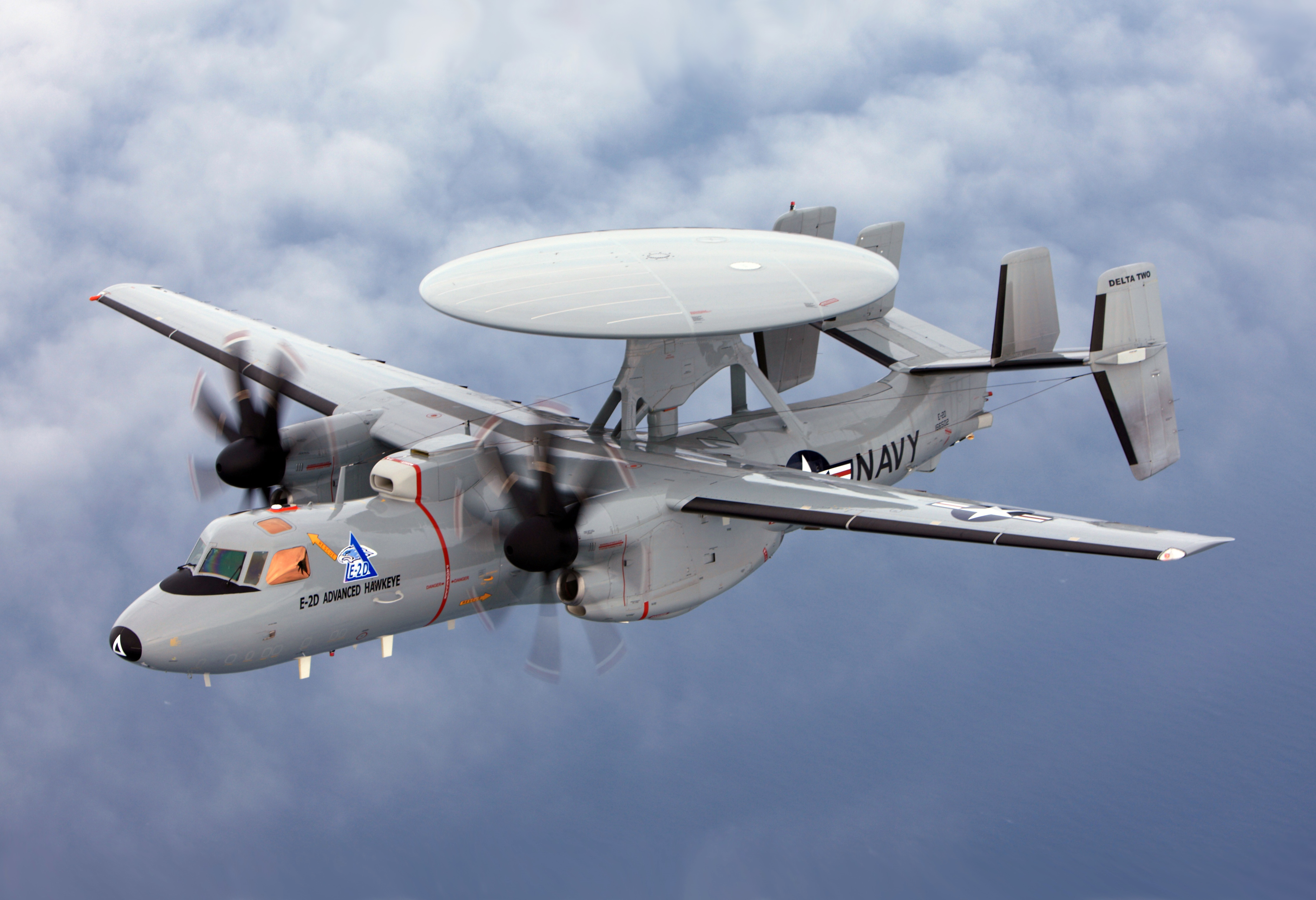
- Country of origin: United States
- Manufacturer: Lockheed Martin
- Designer: Lockheed Martin
- Introduced: 2010
- Type: Early Warning Radar
- Frequency: UHF-Band 0.3–3.0 GHz (99.93–9.99 cm)
- Range: 350 nmi (400 mi; 650 km)
- Diameter: 24 ft (7.3 m)

The AN/APY-9 Radar is an Active Electronically Scanned Array (AESA) pulse Doppler UHF-band multi-mode radar developed and manufactured by Lockheed Martin for the E-2D Advanced Hawkeye.

In accordance with the Joint Electronics Type Designation System (JETDS), the "AN/APY-9" designation represents the 9th design of an Army-Navy airborne electronic device for surveillance and control radar equipment. The JETDS system is also now used to name all Department of Defense and some NATO electronic systems.

== Capabilities ==
The AN/APY-9 Radar is designed for Airborne Early Warning and Control (AEW&C) operations onboard the E-2D 'Advanced Hawkeye', guiding both surface fleet and airborne assets of the United States Navy. It was designed to detect, track, and identify air and surface targets in blue-water, littoral, and overland environments, and is capable of guiding munitions launched by other ships and aircraft through datalink.

The radar system is capable of operating in multiple modes to track different classes of target in a 360° environment using mechanical scanning modes, or providing augmented tracking in 90° sectors by utilizing its AESA capabilities.

The system is all-weather, and can utilize its 'Space-Time Adaptive Processing (STAP)' architecture to suppress jamming, clutter or other sources of electromagnetic interference.

== Composition ==
The radar antenna consists of a group of horizontally polarized Yagi antennas of different lengths and High Power Solid-State transmitters, open architecture and Circuit Card Assembly hardware architecture.

== Specifications ==
- Frequency: 0.3–3.0 GHz (99.93–9.99 cm)
- Search Environment: 360°
- Mechanical Rotation: 6 rpm
- Diameter: 24 feet (7.3 m)
- Search Range: Approximately 350 nmi (400 mi; 650 km)

== See also ==
- List of radars
- List of military electronics of the United States
