= 192 Squadron (Israel) =

Squadron of the Israeli Air Force

192nd Squadron IAF
- טייסת 192
- Logo of the Squadron
- Active: July 1978 - 21 January 2004
- Country: Israel
- Allegiance: Israel Defense Forces
- Branch: Israeli Air Force
- Type: Reconnaissance Squadron
- Role: Airborne Early Warning
- Nickname: Hawkeye Squadron

Aircraft flown
- Reconnaissance: E-2 Hawkeye

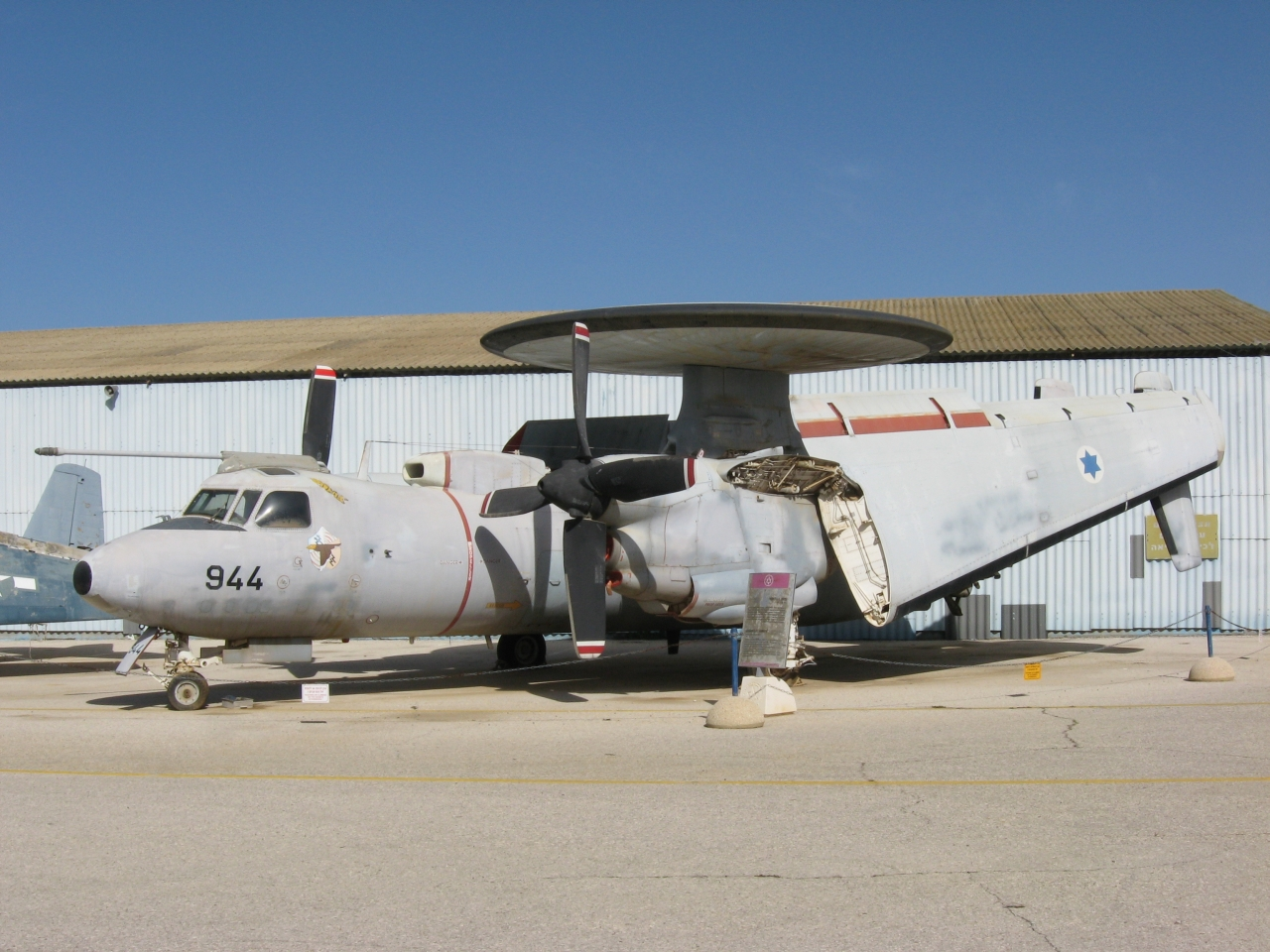
192 Squadron E-2C at the Israeli Air Force Museum in Hatzerim

The 192 Squadron of the Israeli Air Force (IAF), also known as the Daya (Milvus) Squadron, was formed in July 1978 with several E-2 Hawkeye Airborne Early Warning aircraft. The squadron served in a reconnaissance role during the 1982 Lebanon War and in other operations since.

The squadron was reportedly disbanded in 1994, although a flying E-2C appeared in a flight school air show in 1998. The IAF was the first operator to install in-flight refuelling equipment and also applied several avionics enhancements to Israeli E-2Cs. Three of the four Israeli Hawkeyes were sold to Mexico in 2002 after an upgrade package installation, while one was handed over to the Israeli Air Force Museum. The "Roll Out" Ceremony of the first E-2C Hawkeye Aircraft for the Mexican Navy took place on January 21, 2004, at the facilities of Israel Aerospace Industries's Bedek Aviation Group.

== See also ==
- 122 Squadron (Israel) – operator of Gulfstream G500 (G550 "Nahshon-Eitam") Airborne Early Warning/Conformal Airborne Early Warning variant
