= Flottille 4F =

Flotille 4F
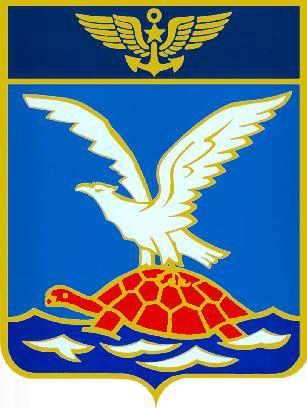
- Active: 1918–1926; 1930–1943; 1944–1997; 2000–present
- Country: France
- Branch: French Naval Aviation
- Type: Naval aviation
- Role: Airborne Early Warning
- Size: 90+
- Garrison/HQ: Base Aéronavale Lann Bihoué
- Nickname: The four (La quatre)
- Colors: Orange
- Equipment: Northrop Grumman E-2 Hawkeye
- Engagements: World War II; First Indochina War; Lebanese Civil War; Bosnian War; War in Afghanistan (2001–present); Opération Harmattan
- Decorations: Croix de Guerre 1939–1945; Croix de guerre des théâtres d'opérations extérieures Cross for Military Valour

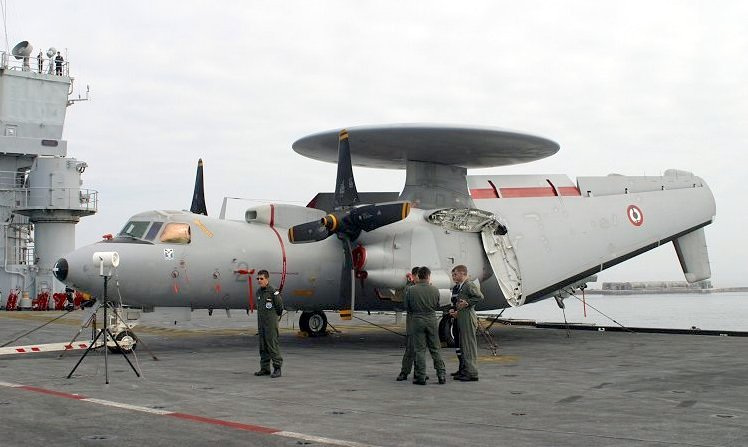
A E-2C Hawkeye in 2004

Flotille 4F (abbreviated to 4F) is a French Aeronavale aircraft squadron based at Base Aéronavale de Lann Bihoué and equipped with three Northrop Grumman E-2C Hawkeye aircraft, these aircraft are operated from the aircraft carrier Charles de Gaulle.

== Post-war history ==
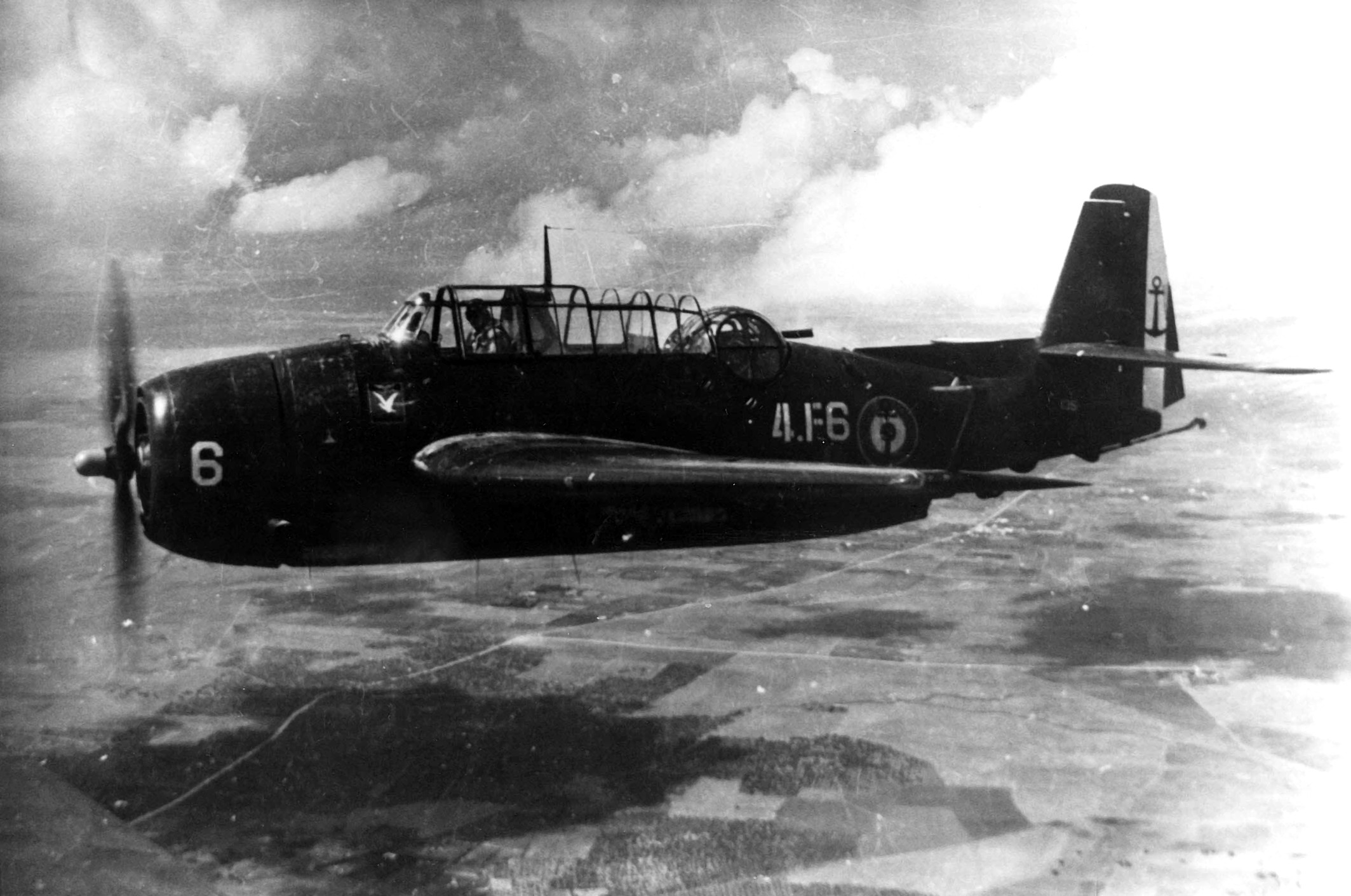
A TBM-3E in the 1950s

The squadron was formed in July 1944 to operate the Douglas SBD Dauntless dive-bomber, it converted to the Grumman TBM-3E Avenger in October 1953. In 1959 the squadron re-equipped with the Breguet Alizé carrier-based anti-submarine aircraft, the squadron operated these aircraft until 1997.

Flotille 4F was re-formed on 10 March 2000 to operate three Northrop Grumman E-2C Hawkeye carried-based airborne early warning aircraft.

== Bibliography ==
- Jackson, Paul A. (1979). French Military Aviation. Leicester, UK: Midland Counties Publications. ISBN 0 90459718 0.
- Morareau, Lucien (February 1990). "Histoire de l'Aéronautique embarquée en France: la 4eme Flotille, à la reconaissance et bombardement (1)" [History of French Carrier Units: The 4th Reconnaissance and Bombardment Squadron, Part 1]. Le Fana de l'Aviation (in French) (243): 14–21. ISSN 0757-4169.
- Morareau, Lucien (March 1990). "Histoire de l'Aéronautique embarquée en France: la 4eme Flotille, à la reconaissance et bombardement (2)" [History of French Carrier Units: 4th Reconnaissance and Bombardment Squadron, Part 2]. Le Fana de l'Aviation (in French) (244): 42–44. ISSN 0757-4169.
- Morareau, Lucien (April 1990). "Histoire de l'Aéronautique embarquée en France: la 4eme Flotille, à la reconaissance et bombardement (3)" [History of French Carrier Units: 4th Reconnaissance and Bombardment Squadron, Part 3]. Le Fana de l'Aviation (in French) (245): 21–26. ISSN 0757-4169.
- Morareau, Lucien (May 1990). "Histoire de l'Aéronautique embarquée en France: la 4eme Flotille, à la reconaissance et bombardement (4)" [History of French Carrier Units: 4th Reconnaissance and Bombardment Squadron, Part 4]. Le Fana de l'Aviation (in French) (246): 36–42. ISSN 0757-4169.
- Morareau, Lucien (June 1990). "Histoire de l'Aéronautique embarquée en France: la 4eme Flotille, à la reconaissance et bombardement (5)" [History of French Carrier Units: 4th Reconnaissance and Bombardment Squadron, Part 5]. Le Fana de l'Aviation (in French) (247): 26–32. ISSN 0757-4169.
- Morareau, Lucien (July 1990). "Histoire de l'Aéronautique embarquée en France: la 4eme Flotille, à la reconaissance et bombardement (6)" [History of French Carrier Units: 4th Reconnaissance and Bombardment Squadron, Part 6]. Le Fana de l'Aviation (in French) (248): 12–21. ISSN 0757-4169.
