= Grumman E-2 Hawkeye =

Airborne early warning and control aircraft

E-2 Hawkeye
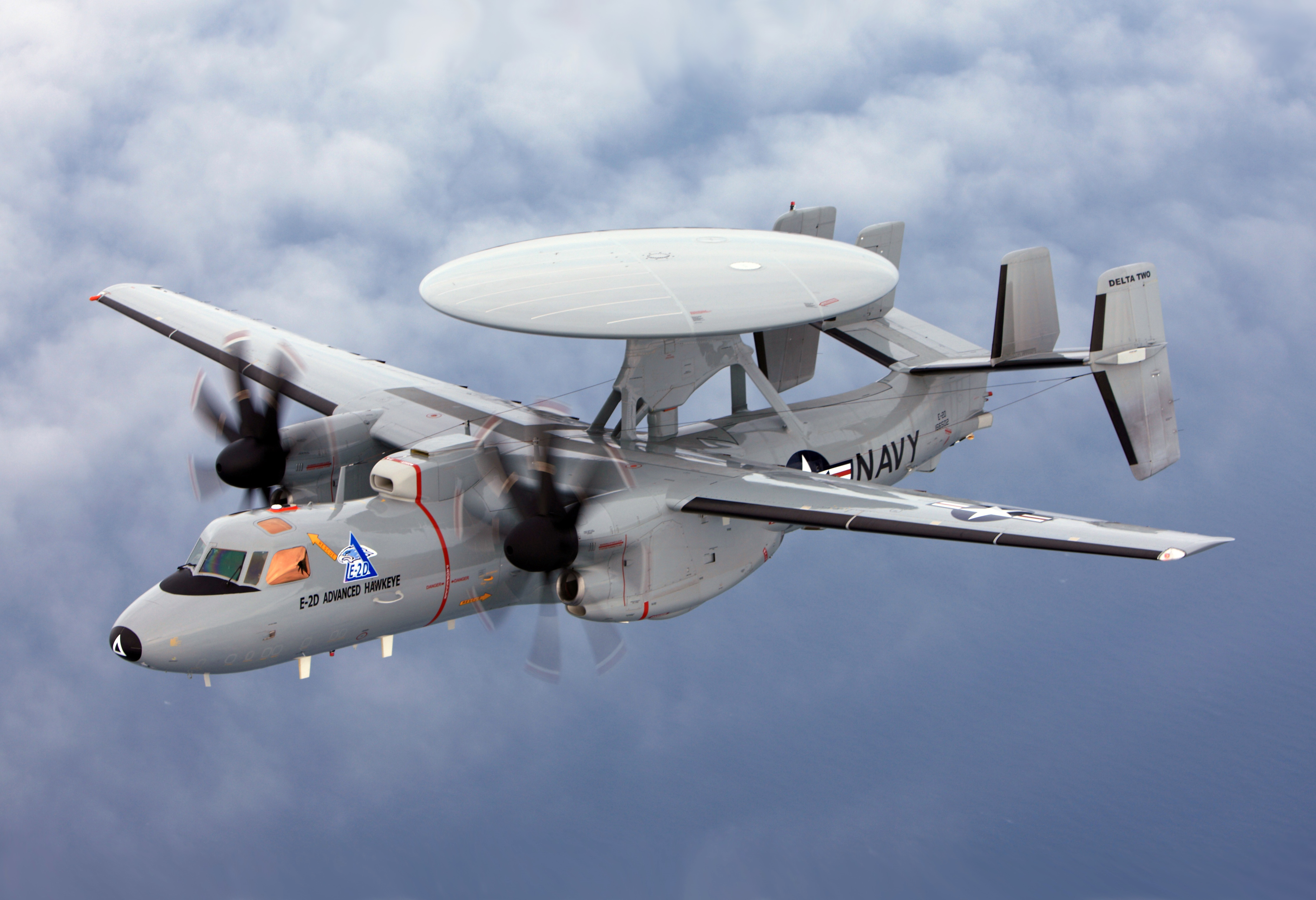
- An E-2D Advanced Hawkeye conducts a flight test

General information
- Type: Airborne early warning and control
- National origin: United States
- Manufacturer: Grumman; Northrop Grumman
- Status: In service
- Primary users: United States Navy See § Operators
- Number built: 313 (total); 88 (E-2D)

History
- Manufactured: 1960–present
- Introduction date: January 1964
- First flight: 21 October 1960
- Developed into: Grumman C-2 Greyhound

The Northrop Grumman E-2 Hawkeye is an American all-weather, carrier-capable, tactical airborne early warning (AEW) aircraft. This twin-turboprop aircraft was designed and developed during the late 1950s and early 1960s by the Grumman Aircraft Company for the United States Navy as a replacement for the earlier, piston-engined E-1 Tracer, which was rapidly becoming obsolete. The aircraft's performance has been upgraded with the E-2B and E-2C versions, where most of the changes were made to the radar and radio communications due to advances in electronic integrated circuits and other electronics.

The fourth major version of the Hawkeye is the E-2D, which first flew in 2007. The E-2 was the first aircraft designed specifically for AEW, as opposed to a modification of an existing airframe, such as the Boeing E-3 Sentry. Variants of the Hawkeye have been in continuous production since 1960, giving it the longest production run of any carrier-based aircraft.

The E-2 received the nickname "Super Fudd" because it replaced the WF (later E-1) "Willy Fudd". In recent decades, the E-2 has been commonly referred to as the "Hummer" because of the distinctive sounds of its turboprop engines, quite unlike those of turbojet and turbofan jet engines. In addition to U.S. Navy (USN) service, smaller numbers of E-2s have been sold to the armed forces of Egypt, France, Israel, Japan, Mexico, Singapore, and Taiwan. Grumman also used the basic layout of the E-2 to produce the Grumman C-2 Greyhound cargo aircraft.

== Development ==
=== Background ===
Continual improvements in airborne radars to 1956 led to the construction of AEW airplanes by several different countries and several different armed forces. The functions of command and control and sea and air surveillance were also added. The first carrier-based aircraft to perform these missions for the USN and its allies was the Douglas AD Skyraider. It was replaced in USN service by the Grumman E-1 Tracer, which was a modified version of the S-2 Tracker twin-engined, antisubmarine warfare aircraft, where the radar was carried in an aerofoil-shaped radome carried above the aircraft's fuselage.

=== E-2A and E-2B Hawkeye ===
In 1956, the USN developed a requirement for an AEW aircraft where its data could be integrated into the Naval Tactical Data System aboard its ships, with a design from Grumman being selected to meet this requirement in March 1957. Its design, initially designated W2F-1, but later redesignated the E-2A Hawkeye, was the first carrier plane that had been designed from its wheels up as an AEW and command-and-control airplane. The design engineers at Grumman faced immense challenges, including the requirement that the aircraft be able to operate from the older modified Essex-class aircraft carriers. These vessels were built during World War II and were smaller than modern carriers, being later modified to allow them to operate jet aircraft. Consequently, height, weight, and length restrictions had to be factored into the E-2A design, resulting in some handling characteristics that were less than ideal. However, the E-2A never operated from the modified Essex-class carriers.

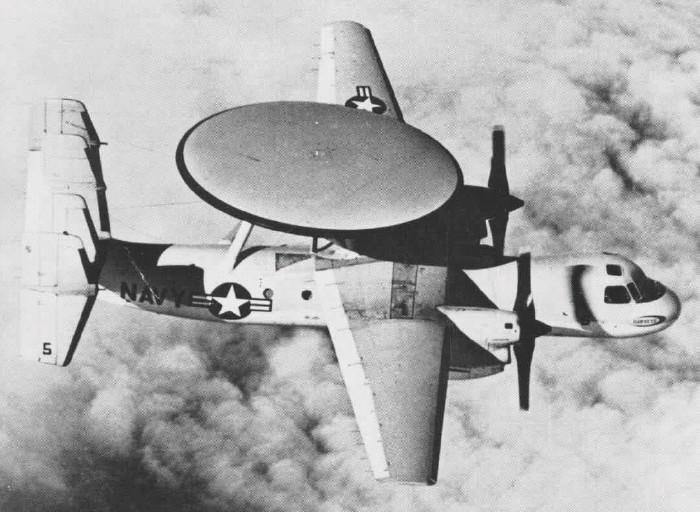
A Grumman E-2A Hawkeye in flight in the early 1960s

The first prototype, acting as an aerodynamic testbed only, flew on 21 October 1960. The first fully equipped aircraft followed it on 19 April 1961 and entered service with the USN as the E-2A in January 1964. By 1965, the project had accumulated so many development issues that it was cancelled after 59 aircraft had already been built. In particular, difficulties were being experienced due to inadequate cooling in the closely packed avionics compartment. Early computers and complex avionics systems generated considerable heat and could fail without proper ventilation. These issues continued long after the aircraft entered service. At one point, reliability was so bad that the entire fleet of aircraft was grounded.

After Navy officials had been forced to explain to Congress why four production contracts had been signed before avionics testing had been completed, action was taken; Grumman and the USN scrambled to improve the design. The unreliable rotary drum computer was replaced by a Litton L-304 digital computer and various avionics systems were replaced – the upgraded aircraft were designated E-2Bs. In total, 49 of the 59 E-2As were upgraded to E-2B standards. These aircraft replaced the E-1B Tracers in the various USN AEW squadrons.

=== E-2C Hawkeye and upgrades ===
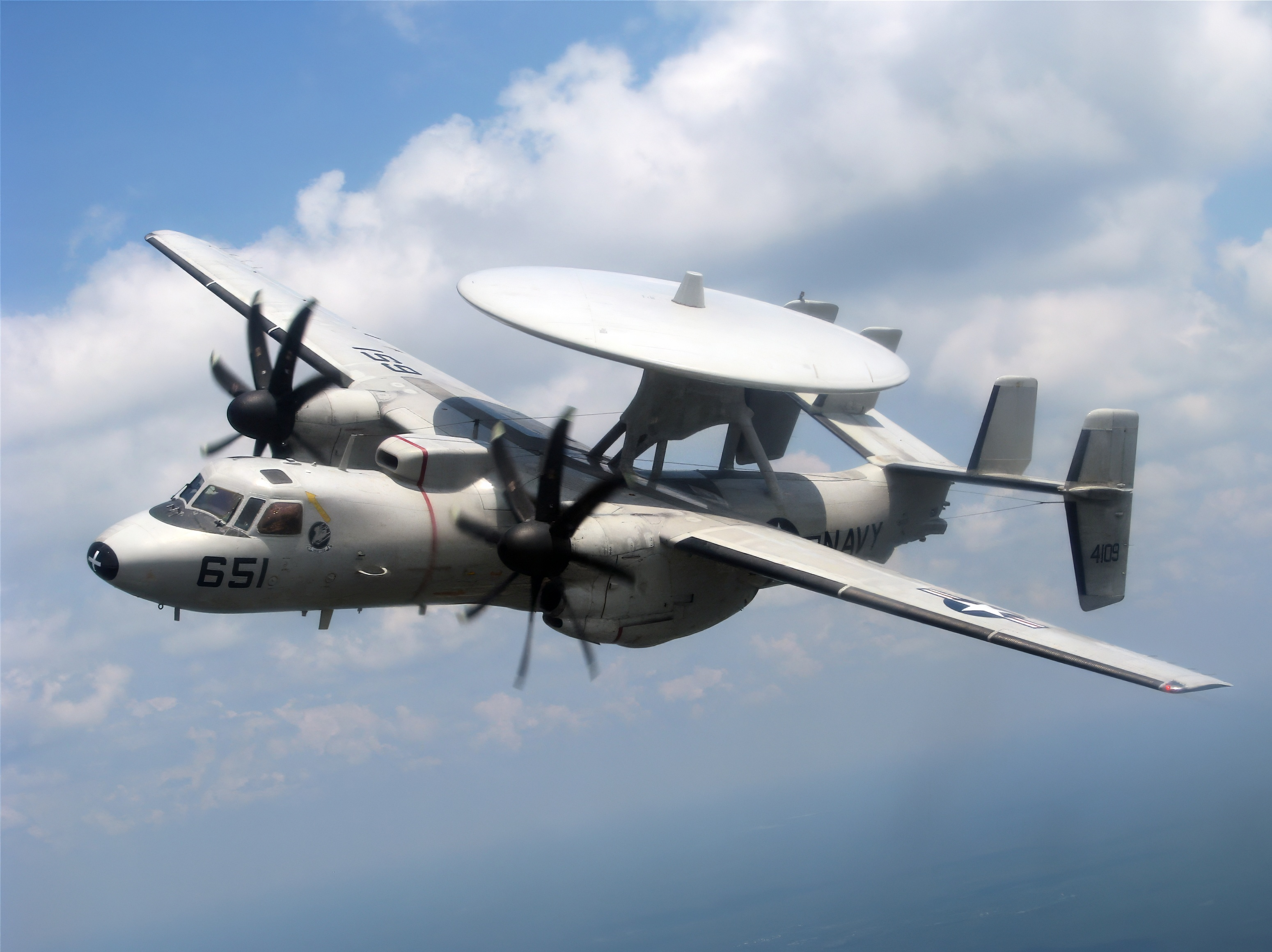
An E-2C Hawkeye assigned to VAW-120 flies over Jacksonville, Florida.

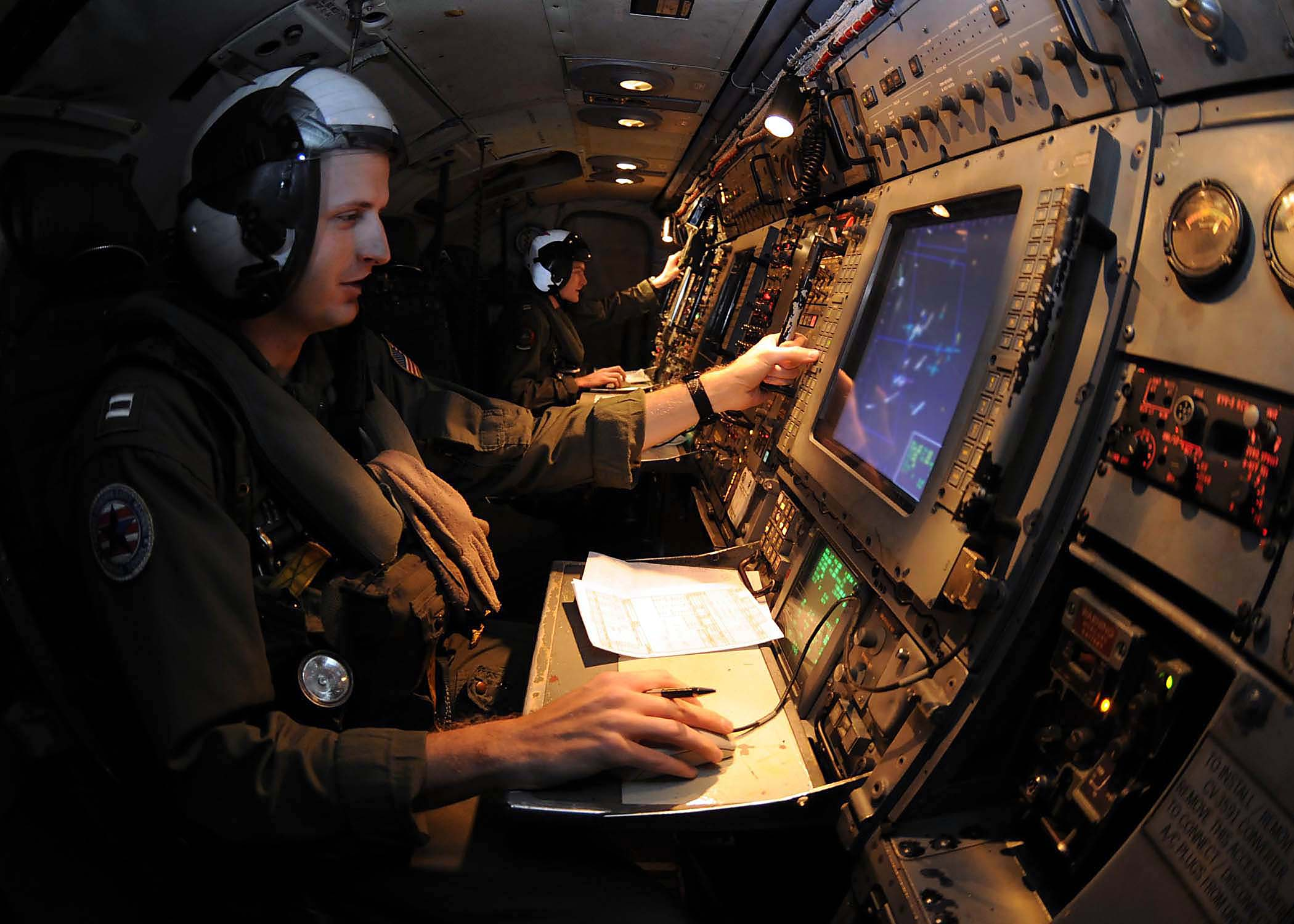
Radar operations inside an E-2C of VAW-115

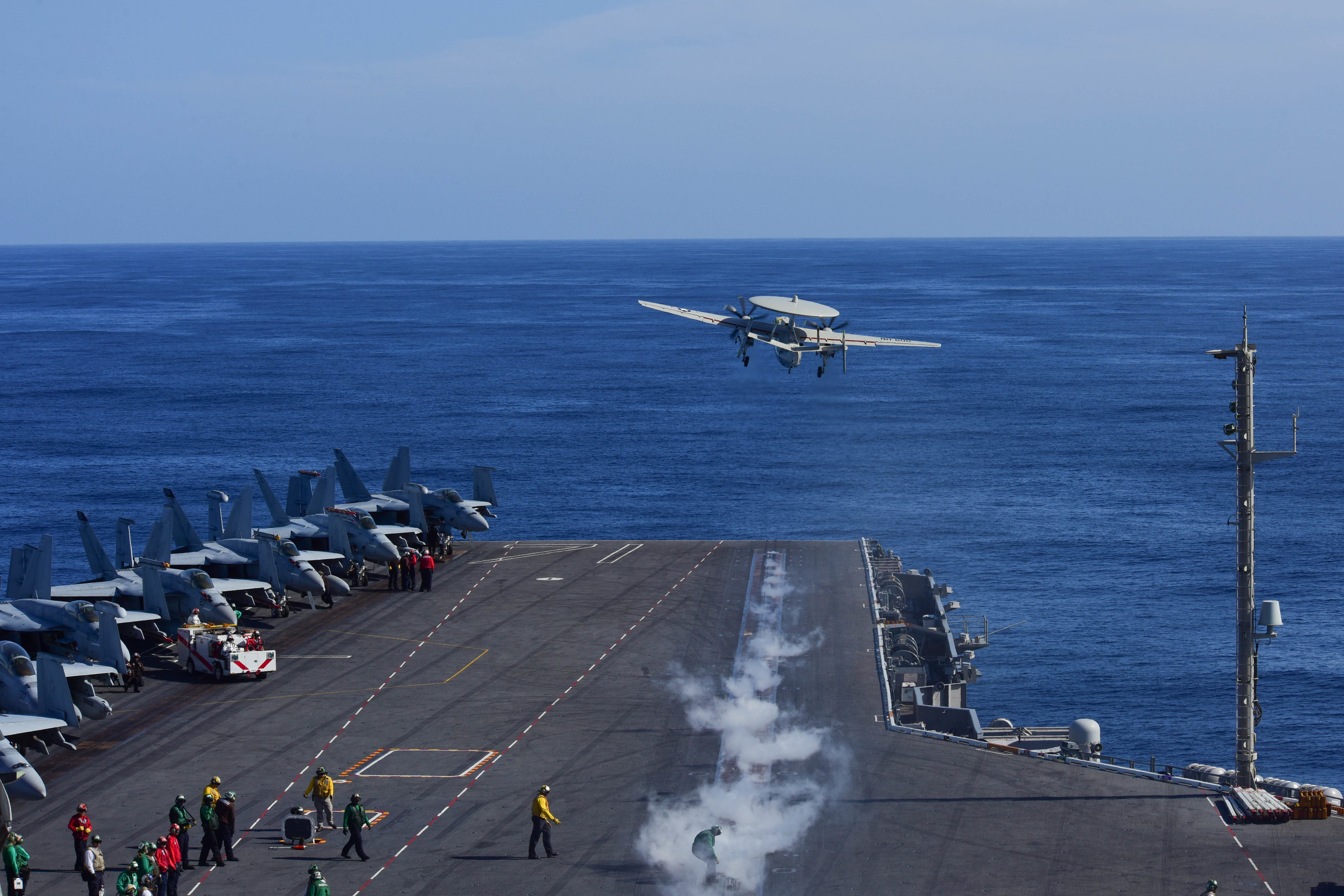
An E-2C Hawkeye takes off from the USS Theodore Roosevelt (CVN-71) in 2019

Although the upgraded E-2B was a vast improvement on the unreliable E-2A, it was an interim measure. The USN knew the design had much greater capability and had yet to achieve the performance and reliability parameters set out in the original 1957 design. In April 1968, a reliability improvement program was initiated. Now that the capabilities of the aircraft were starting to be realized, more were desired; 28 new E-2Cs were ordered to augment the 49 E-2Bs that would be upgraded. Improvements in the new and upgraded aircraft were concentrated in the radar and computer performance.

Two E-2A test machines were modified as E-2C prototypes, the first flying on 20 January 1971. Trials proved satisfactory, and the E-2C was ordered into production. The first production aircraft performed its initial flight on 23 September 1972. The original E-2C, known as Group 0, consisted of 55 aircraft; the first aircraft became operational in 1973 and began serving on carriers in the 1980s and '90s, until they were replaced in first-line service by Group II aircraft. The US Naval Reserve used some aircraft for tracking drug smugglers. The E-2C was commonly used in conjunction with Grumman F-14 Tomcat fighters, monitoring airspace, then vectoring Tomcats over the Link-4A datalink to destroy potential threats with AIM-9 Sidewinder, AIM-7 Sparrow, and most notably the long-range AIM-54C Phoenix missiles.

The next production run, between 1988 and 1991, had 18 aircraft built to the Group I standard, which replaced the E-2's older APS-125 radar and T56-A-425 turboprops with their successors, the APS-139 radar system and T56-A-427 turboprops. The first Group I aircraft entered service in August 1981. Upgrading the Group 0 aircraft to Group I specifications was considered, but the cost was comparable to a new production aircraft, so upgrades were not conducted. Group I aircraft were only flown by the Atlantic Fleet squadrons. This version was followed within a few years by the Group II, which had the improved APS-145 radar. Fifty Group II aircraft were delivered, with 12 being upgraded Group I aircraft. This new version entered service in June 1992 and served with the Pacific and Atlantic Fleet squadrons.

By 1997, the USN intended that all front-line squadrons would be equipped, for a total of 75 Group II aircraft. Grumman merged with Northrop in 1994 and plans began on the Group II Plus, also known as the Group II/NAV upgrade. This kept the same computer and radar as the Group II, while upgrading the pilot avionics, such as replacing the mechanical inertial navigation system (INS) with a more reliable and accurate laser ring gyroscope-driven INS, installing dual multifunction control display units (vs. one in the Group II) and integrating GPS into the weapons system. A variant of the Group II with upgrades to the mission computer and combat information center (CIC) workstations is referred to as the MCU/ACIS; these were produced in small numbers due to production of the Hawkeye 2000 soon after its introduction. All Group II aircraft had their 1960s-vintage computer processors replaced by a mission computer with the same functionality via modern computer technology, referred to as the Group II Mission Computer Replacement Program (GrIIM RePr, pronounced "grim reaper").

Another upgrade to the Group II was the Hawkeye 2000, which featured the same APS-145 radar, but incorporated an upgraded mission computer and CIC workstations (Advanced Control Indicator Set) and carries the USN's new cooperative engagement capability (CEC) data-link system. It is also fitted with larger-capacity, vapor-cycle, avionics cooling system. Starting in 2007, a hardware and software upgrade package began to be added to existing Hawkeye 2000 aircraft. This upgrade allowed faster processing, double-current trackfile capacity, and access to satellite information networks. Hawkeye 2000 cockpits being upgraded included solid-state glass displays and a GPS-approach capability. The remaining Hawkeye Group II NAV Upgrade aircraft received GPS approach capability, but did not get the solid-state glass displays.

In 2004, the E-2C's propeller system was changed; a new eight-bladed propeller (prop) system named NP2000 was developed by the Hamilton-Sundstrand company to replace the old four-bladed design. Improvements included reduced vibrations and better maintainability as a result of the ability to remove prop blades individually instead of having to remove the entire prop and hub assembly. The prop blades are of carbon fiber construction with steel leading-edge inserts and deicing boots at the root of the blade.

=== E-2D Advanced Hawkeye ===
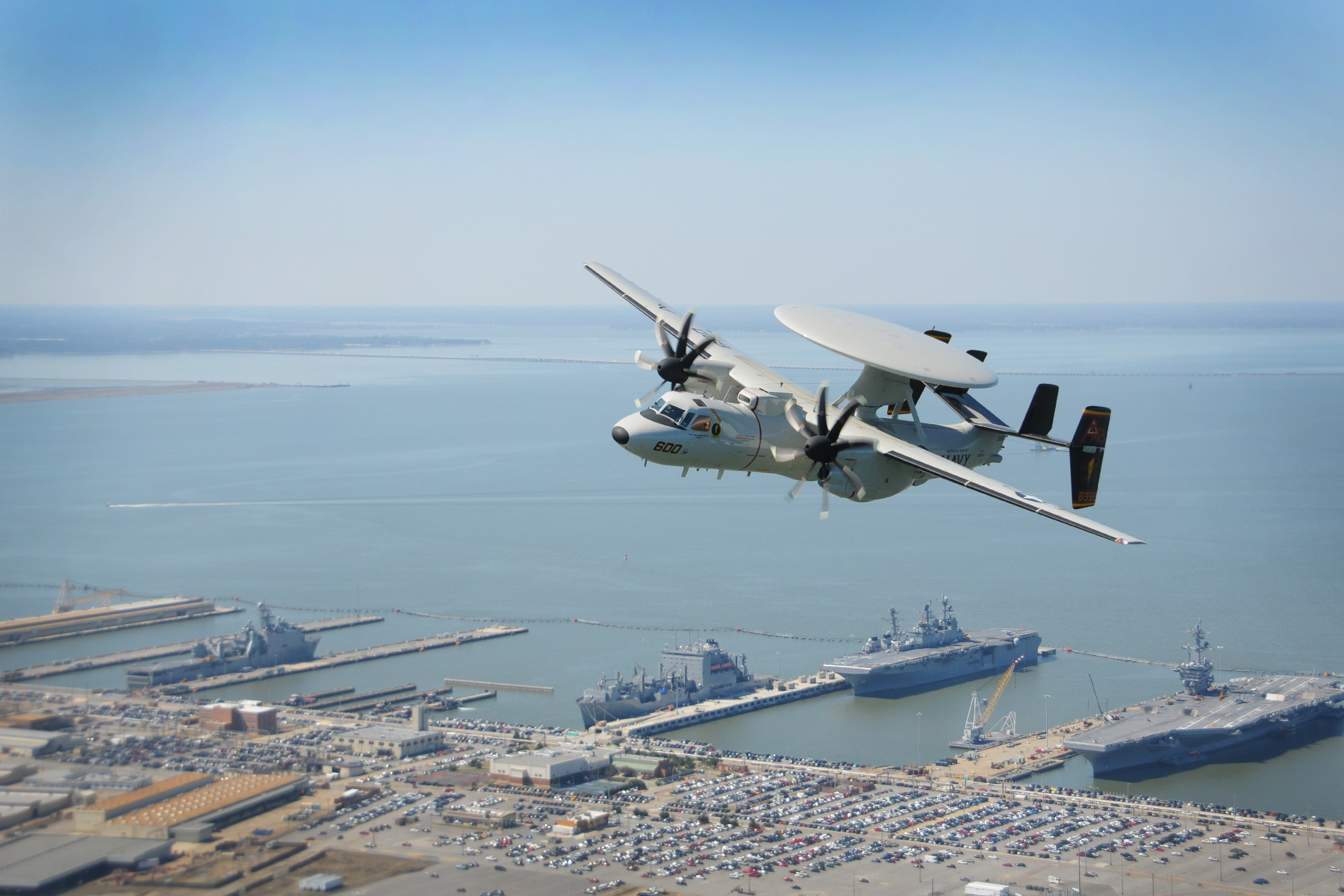
An E-2D of VAW-125 over NS Norfolk

The E-2 was once considered for replacement by the "Common Support Aircraft", but this concept was abandoned. The latest E-2 version is the E-2D Advanced Hawkeye, which features an entirely new avionics suite, including the new AN/APY-9 radar, radio suite, mission computer, integrated satellite communications, flight-management system, improved T56-A-427A engines, a glass cockpit, and aerial refueling. The APY-9 radar features an active electronically scanned array, which adds electronic scanning to the mechanical rotation of the radar in its radome. The E-2D includes provisions for the copilot to act as a "tactical fourth operator", able to reconfigure the main cockpit display to show radar, IFF, and Link 16 (JTIDS) or CEC and to access all acquired data. The E-2D's first flight occurred in August 2007.

In May 2009, an E-2D used its CEC system to engage an overland cruise missile with a Standard Missile SM-6 fired from another platform in an integrated fire-control system test. These two systems were to form the basis of the Naval Integrated Fire Control – Counter Air (NIFC-CA) when fielded in 2015; the USN is investigating adding other systems to the NIFC-CA network in the future.

The APY-9 radar has been suspected of being capable of detecting fighter-sized stealth aircraft, which are typically optimized against high frequencies such as Ka, Ku, X, C, and parts of the S-bands. Small aircraft lack the size or weight allowances for all-spectrum, low-observable features, leaving a vulnerability to detection by the UHF-band APY-9 radar, potentially detecting fifth-generation fighters including the Russian Sukhoi Su-57 and the Chinese Chengdu J-20 and Shenyang J-31. Historically, UHF radars had resolution and detection issues that made them ineffective for accurate targeting and fire control; Northrop Grumman and Lockheed claim that the APY-9 has solved these shortcomings by using advanced electronic scanning and high digital computing power via space/time adaptive processing. According to the USN's NIFC-CA concept, the E-2D could guide fleet weapons, such as AIM-120 AMRAAM and SM-6 missiles, onto targets beyond a launch platform's detection range or capabilities.

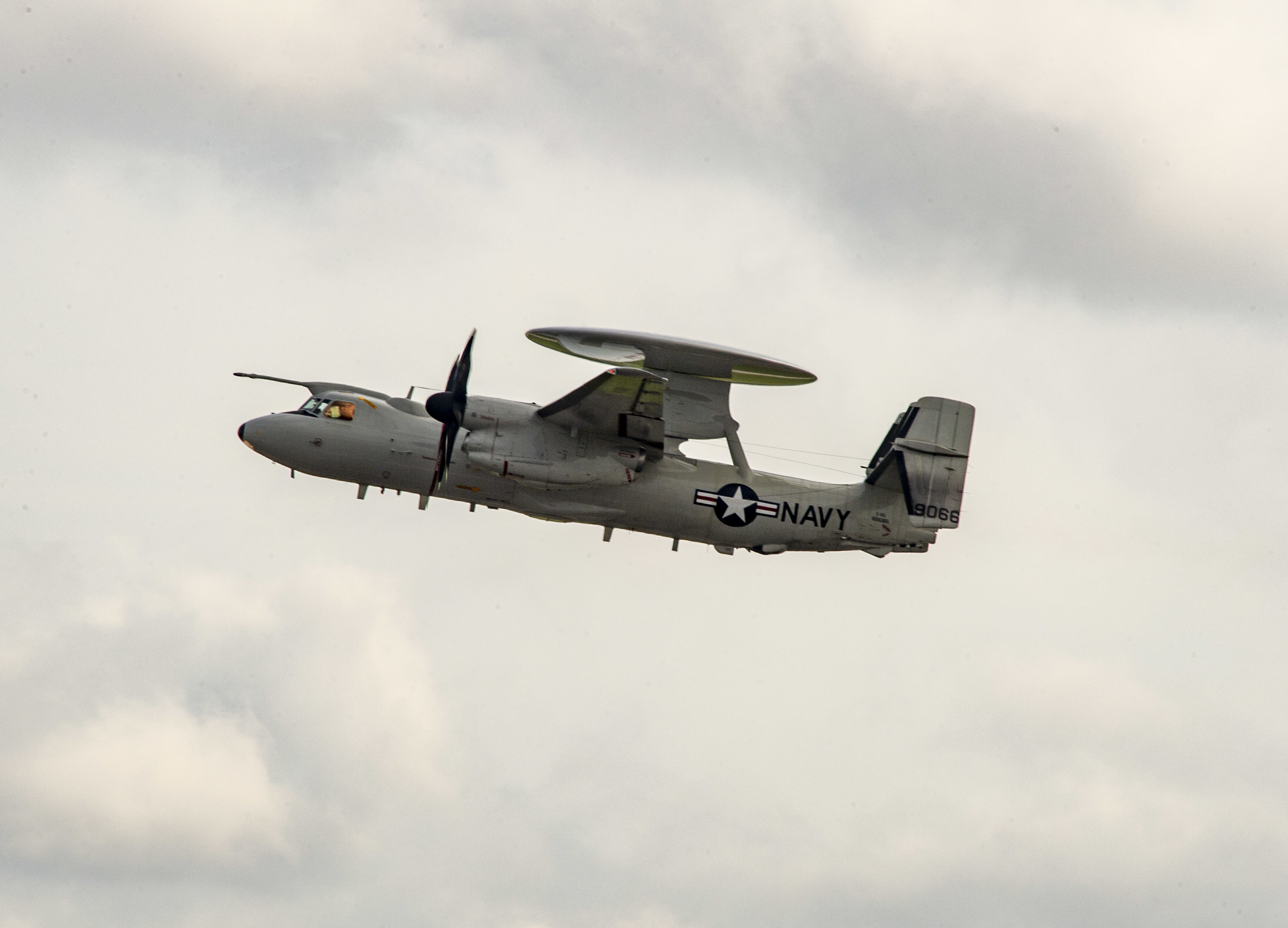
The first E-2D with aerial refueling capability was delivered in September 2019.

Deliveries of initial-production E-2Ds began in 2010. In February 2010, the first production E-2D Advanced, dubbed "Delta One", conducted the D model's first carrier landing aboard USS Harry S. Truman as a part of carrier suitability testing. In September 2011, an E-2D was successfully launched by the prototype Electromagnetic Aircraft Launch System (EMALS) at Naval Air Engineering Station Lakehurst.

In February 2013, the Office of the Secretary of Defense approved the E-2D to enter full-rate production. The Navy planned for an initial operational capability by 2015. In June 2013, the 10th E-2D was delivered to the Navy, with an additional 10 aircraft in various stages of manufacturing and predelivery flight testing. In July 2013, Northrop Grumman was awarded a $113.7 million contract for five full-rate production Lot 2 E-2D Advanced Hawkeye aircraft.

In August 2013, Northrop Grumman was awarded a $617 million contract for five E-2Ds until full-rate production Lot 1. In June 2014, Northrop Grumman was awarded a $3.6 billion contract to supply 25 more E-2D, for a total contracted number of 50 aircraft. 13 E-2D models had been delivered by that time. In December 2016, an E-2D flew for the first time with an aerial refueling capability. This feature allows the aircraft to double its time on station to five hours and increase total mission time from four to seven hours. The refueling modification began with the 46th plane (out of 75 planned) for delivery in late 2020, costing an additional $2 million per aircraft. The Navy plans to retrofit the feature on all previous Hawkeyes for $6 million per plane.

== Design ==
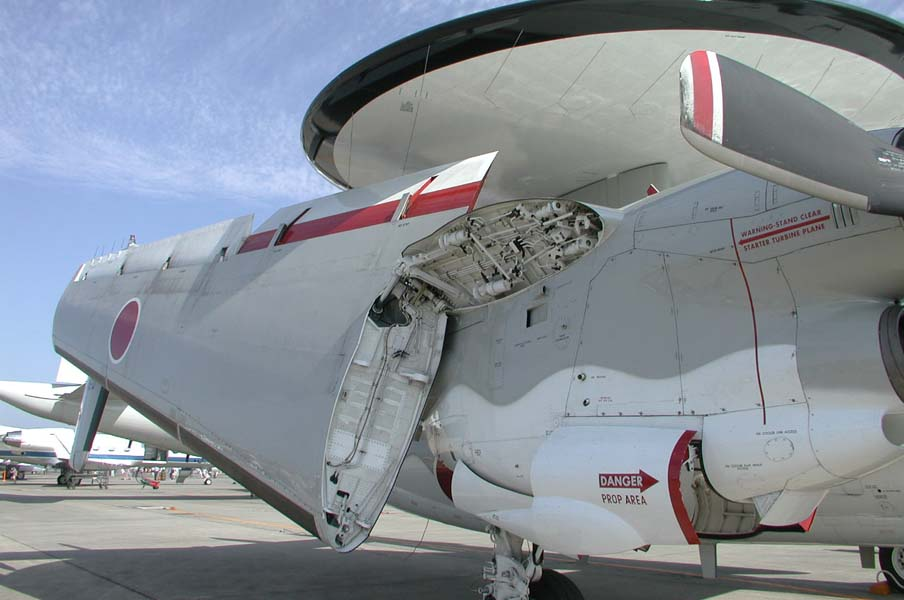
Like the earlier E-1 Tracer, the E-2 uses the Grumman Sto-Wing folding wing system for carrier storage.

The E-2 is a high-wing airplane, with one Allison T56 turboprop engine (5250 shp rating) on each wing and retractable tricycle landing gear. As with all CATOBAR carrier-borne airplanes, the E-2 is equipped with a tail hook for recovery (landing) and the nose gear can attach to a shuttle of the aircraft carrier's catapults for launch (takeoff). A distinguishing feature of the Hawkeye is its 24-foot-diameter (7.3 m) rotating radar dome (rotodome) that is mounted above its fuselage and wings. This carries the E-2's primary antennas for its long-range radar and IFF systems. No other carrier-borne aircraft possesses one of these. Land-based aircraft with rotodomes include the Boeing E-3 Sentry, a larger AWACS airplane operated by the U.S. Air Force and NATO air forces in large numbers. The similarly placed stationary radome of the E-2's piston-engined predecessor, the E-1 Tracer, also mandated the E-2's adoption of a modern version of the Grumman Sto-Wing folding wing system, preventing the folded wing panels from making contact with the E-2's rotodome.

The aircraft is operated by a crew of five, with the pilot and co-pilot on the flight deck and the CIC officer, air-control officer, and radar operator stations located in the rear fuselage directly beneath the rotodome.

In U.S. service, the E-2 Hawkeye provides all-weather airborne early warning and command-and-control capabilities for all aircraft-carrier battle groups. Its other purposes include sea and land surveillance, the control of the aircraft carrier's fighter planes for air defense, the control of strike aircraft on offensive missions, the control of search-and-rescue missions for naval aviators and sailors lost at sea, and relaying radio communications air-to-air and ship-to-air. It can also serve in an air traffic control (ATC) capacity in emergency situations when land-based ATC is unavailable.

The E-2C and E-2D Hawkeyes use advanced electronic sensors combined with digital computer signal processing, especially its radars, for early warning of enemy aircraft attacks and antiship missile attacks, controlling the carrier's combat air patrol (CAP) fighters, and secondarily for surveillance of the surrounding sea and land for enemy warships, guided-missile launchers, and any other electronic-surveillance missions as directed.

== Operational history ==
=== US Navy ===
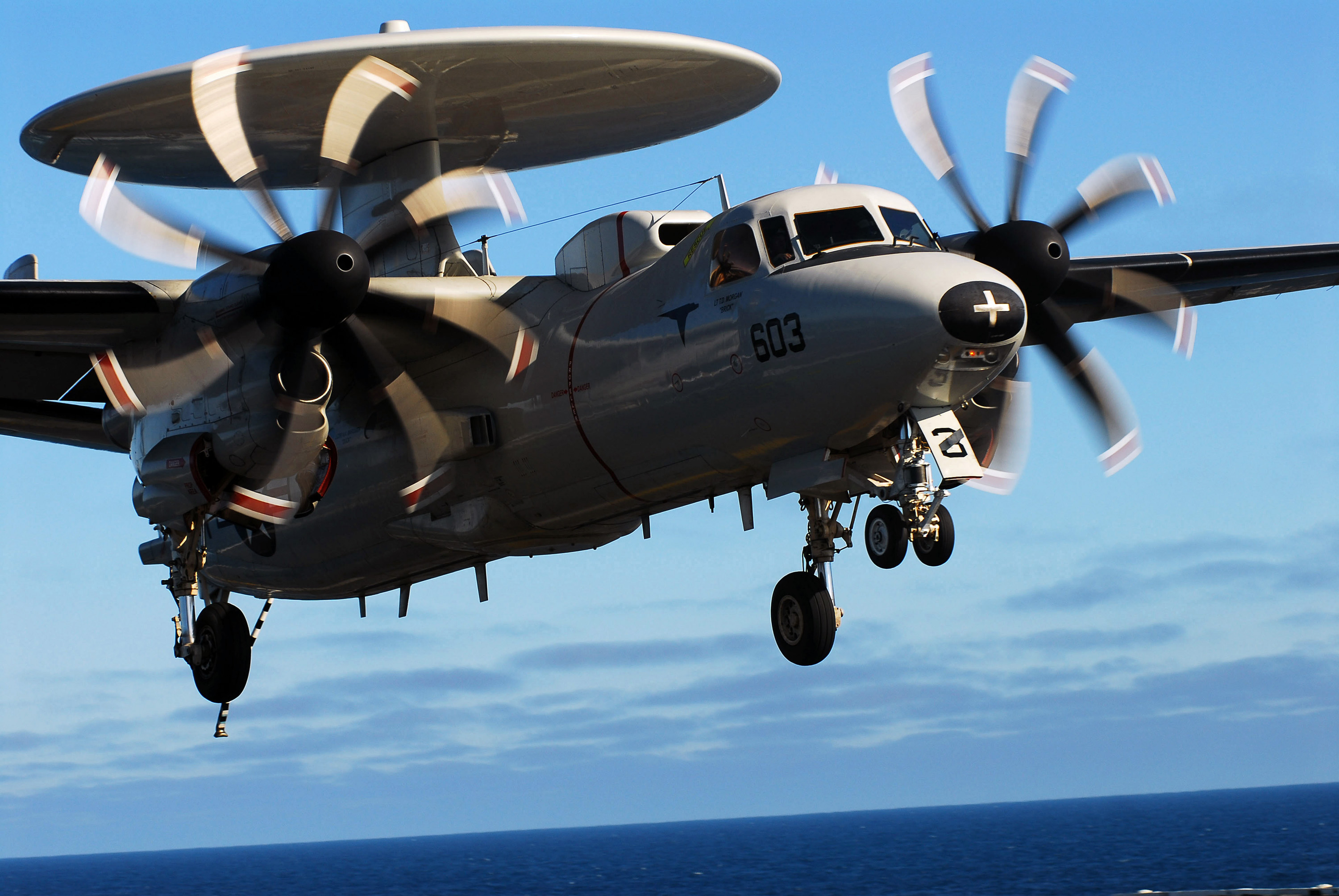
A USN E-2C of VAW-117 approaches the flight deck of USS John C. Stennis.

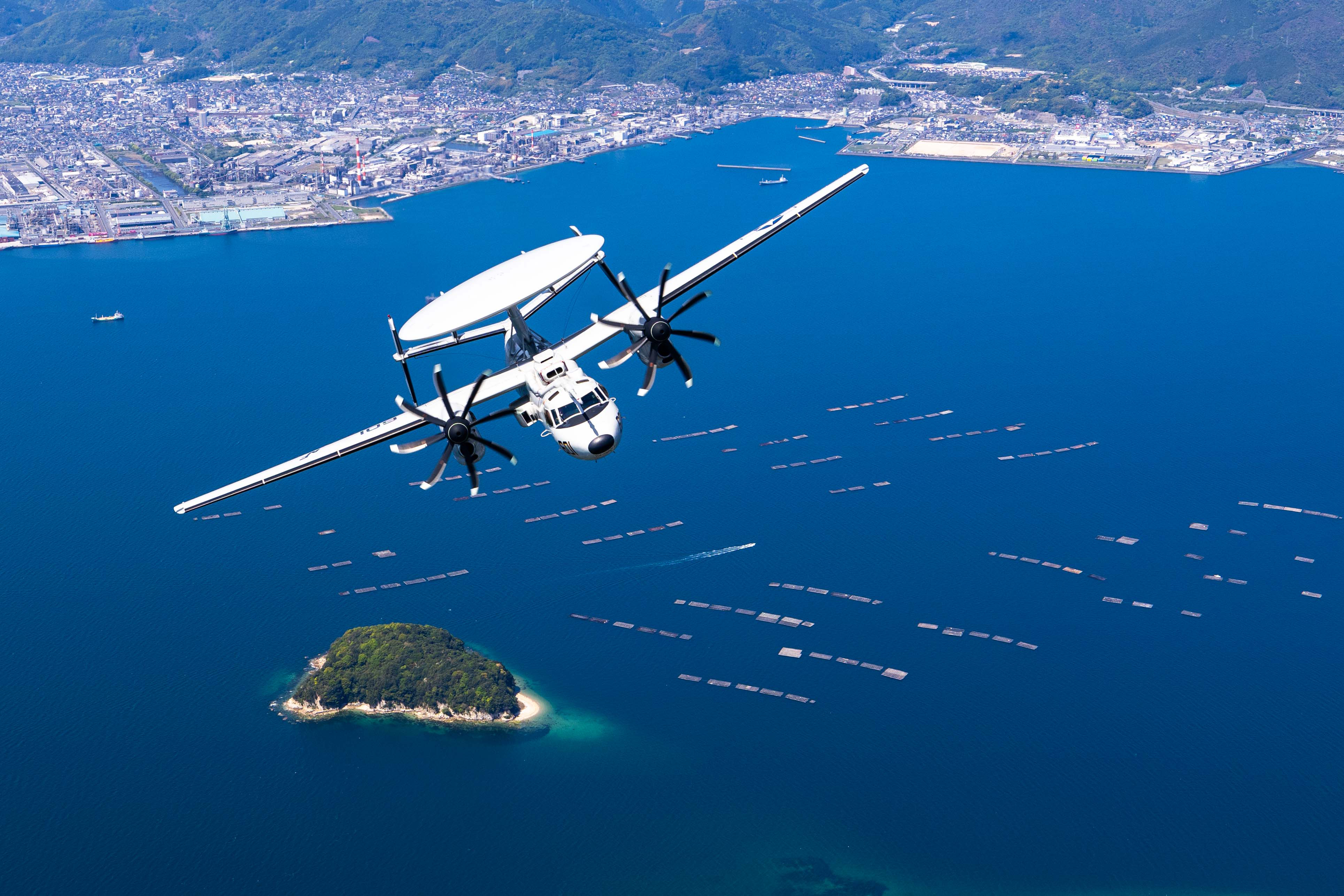
A USN E-2D Hawkeye flies over Iwakuni, Japan, May 2025.

The E-2A entered USN service in January 1964 and in April 1964 with VAW-11 at NAS North Island. The first deployment was aboard the aircraft carrier USS Kitty Hawk during 1965.

Since entering combat during the Vietnam War, the E-2 has served the USN around the world, acting as the electronic "eyes of the fleet".

In August 1981, a Hawkeye from VAW-124 "Bear Aces" directed two F-14 Tomcats from VF-41 "Black Aces" in an intercept mission in the Gulf of Sidra that resulted in the downing of two Libyan Sukhoi Su-22s. Hawkeyes from VAW-123 aboard the aircraft carrier USS America directed a group of Tomcat fighters flying the CAP during Operation El Dorado Canyon, the joint strike of two carrier battle groups in the Mediterranean Sea against Libyan targets during 1986.

More recently, E-2Cs provided the command and control for both aerial warfare and land-attack missions during the Persian Gulf War. Hawkeyes have supported the U.S. Coast Guard, U.S. Customs Service, and American federal and state police forces during antidrug operations.

In the mid-1980s, several U.S. Navy E-2Cs were made available to the U.S. Coast Guard and the U.S. Customs Service for counter-narcotics (CN) and maritime interdiction operations. The Coast Guard produced a small cadre of naval flight officers (NFOs), starting with the recruitment and interservice transfer of Navy NFOs with E-2 flight experience and the flight training of other junior Coast Guard officers as NFOs. A fatal aircraft mishap on 24 August 1990 involving a Coast Guard E-2C at the former Naval Station Roosevelt Roads in Puerto Rico prompted the Coast Guard to discontinue flying E-2Cs and to return its E-2Cs to the Navy. The U.S. Customs Service also returned its E-2Cs to the Navy and concentrated on the use of former USN P-3 Orion aircraft in the CN role.

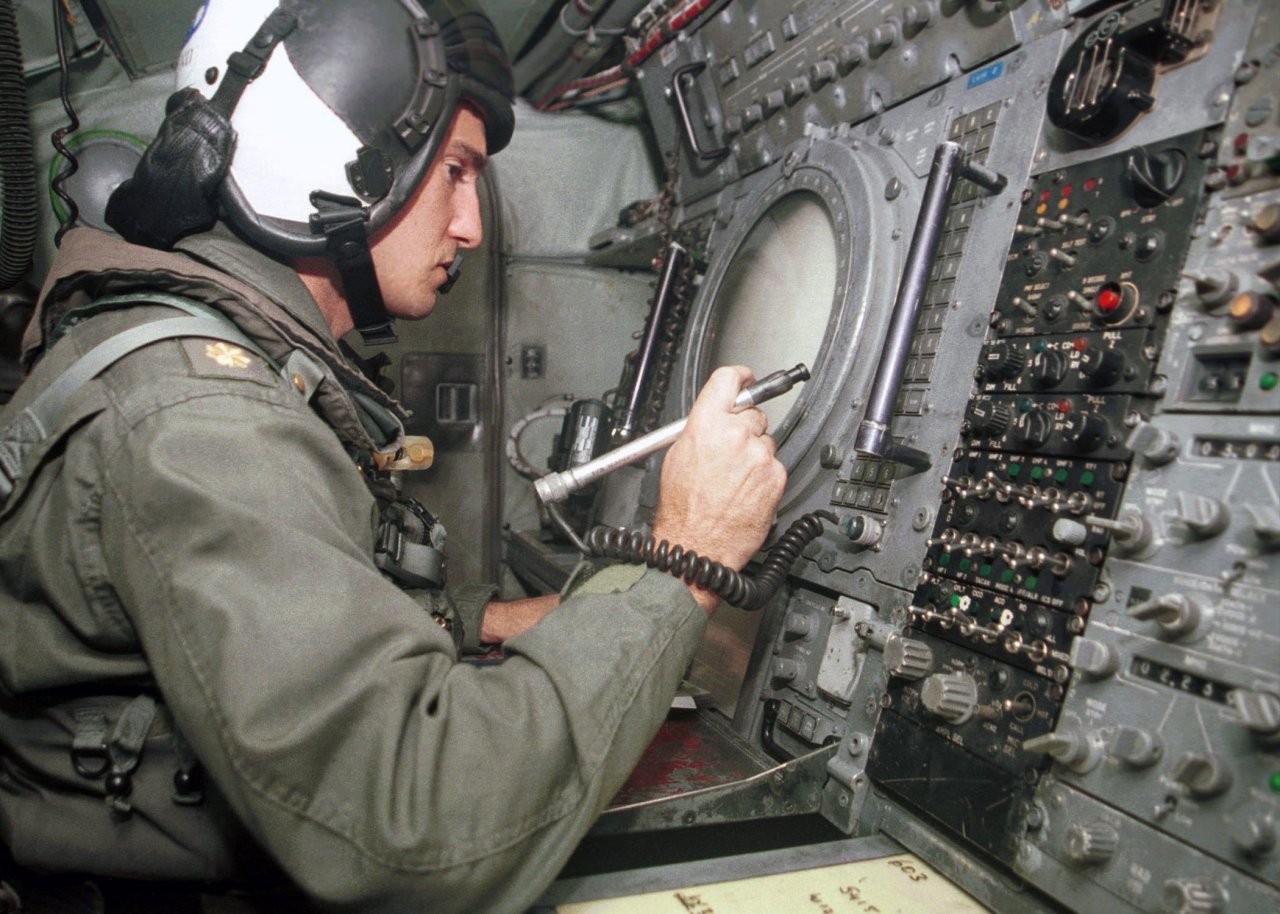
Hawkeye interior (Group 0 configuration)

E-2C Hawkeye squadrons played a critical role in air operations during Operation Desert Storm. In one instance, a Hawkeye crew provided critical air-control direction to two F/A-18 Hornet aircrew, resulting in the shootdown of two Iraqi MiG-21s. During Operations Southern Watch and Desert Fox, Hawkeye crews continued to provide thousands of hours of air coverage, while providing air-to-air and air-to-ground command and control in a number of combat missions.

The E-2 Hawkeye is a crucial component of all USN carrier air wings; each carrier is equipped with four Hawkeyes (five in some situations), allowing for continuous, 24-hour-a-day operation of at least one E-2 and for one or two to undergo maintenance in the aircraft carrier's hangar deck at all times. Until 2005, the USN Hawkeyes were organized into East and West Coast wings, supporting their respective fleets, but the East coast wing was disestablished, and all aircraft were organized into a single wing based at Point Mugu, California. Six E-2C aircraft were deployed by the U.S. Naval Reserve for CN and homeland security operations until 9 March 2013, when the sole reserve squadron, VAW-77 "Nightwolves", was decommissioned and its six aircraft sent to other squadrons.

During Operation Enduring Freedom and Operation Iraqi Freedom, all 10 USN Hawkeye squadrons flew overland sorties. They provided battle management for attack of enemy ground targets, close-air-support coordination, combat search-and-rescue control, and airspace management, as well as data-link and communication relay for both land and naval forces. During the aftermath of Hurricane Katrina, three Hawkeye squadrons (two regular Navy and one Navy Reserve) were deployed in support of civilian relief efforts, including ATC responsibilities spanning three states, and the control of U.S. Army, USN, U.S. Air Force, U.S. Marine Corps, U.S. Coast Guard, and Army National Guard and Air National Guard helicopter rescue units.

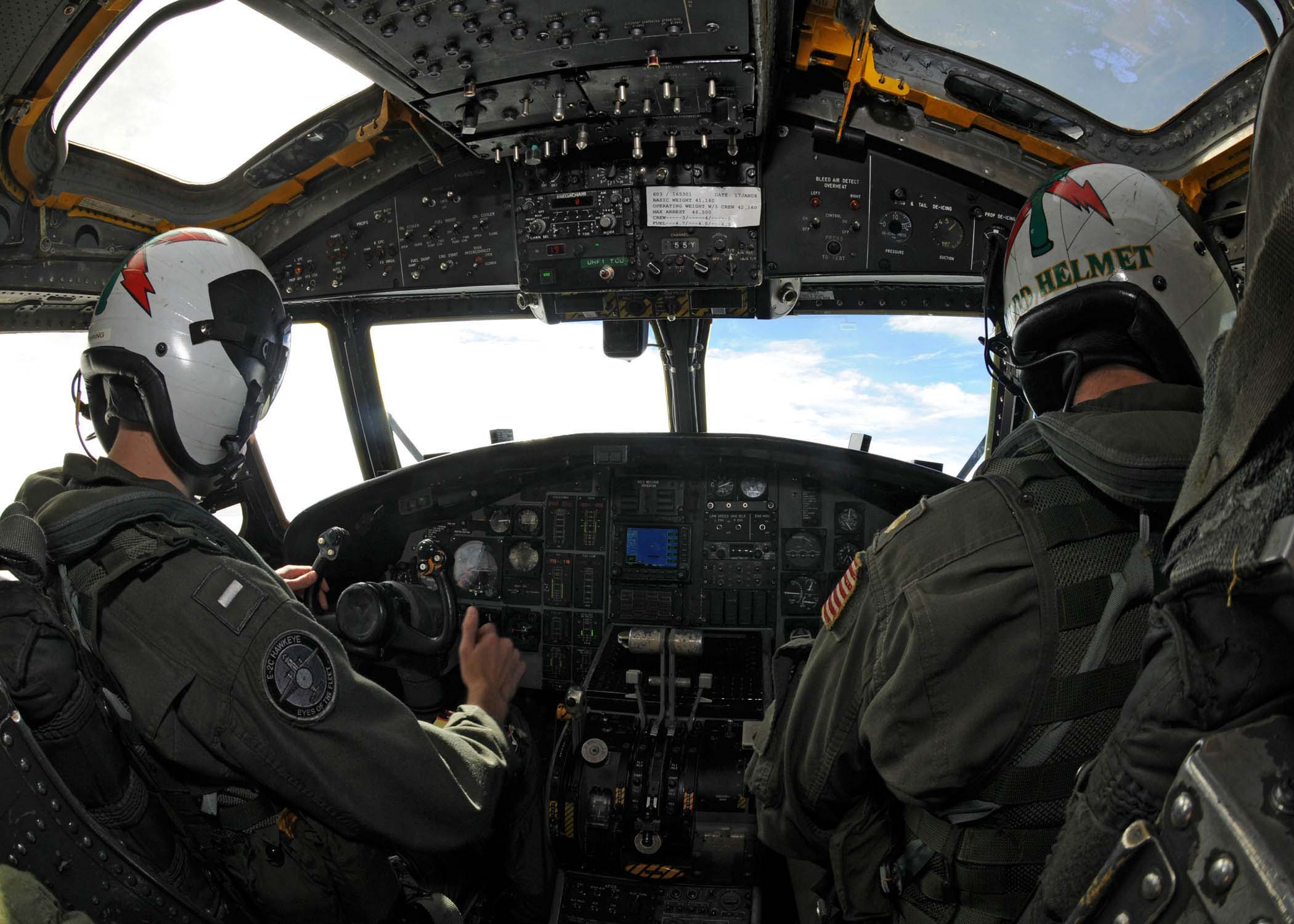
The cockpit of an E-2C Hawkeye of United States Navy VAW-115

Hawkeye 2000s first deployed in 2003 aboard USS Nimitz with VAW-117, the "Wallbangers" (formerly the "Nighthawks") and CVW-11. U.S. Navy E-2C Hawkeyes have been upgraded with eight-bladed propellers as part of the NP2000 program; the first squadron to cruise with the new propellers was VAW-124 "Bear Aces". The Hawkeye 2000 version can track over 2,000 targets simultaneously while also detecting 20,000 targets to a range greater than 400 mi (640 km) and simultaneously guide 40 to 100 air-to-air intercepts or air-to-surface engagements.

In 2014, several E-2C Hawkeyes from the Bear Aces of VAW-124 were deployed from USS George H.W. Bush as flying command posts and air-traffic controllers over Iraq during Operation Inherent Resolve against the Islamic State.

VAW-120, the E-2C fleet replacement squadron, began receiving E-2D Advanced Hawkeyes for training use in July 2010. On 27 March 2014, the first E-2Ds were delivered to the VAW-125. The E-2D achieved Initial Operational Capability in October 2014 when VAW-125 was certified to have five operational aircraft. This began training on the aircraft for its first operational deployment, scheduled for 2015 aboard USS Theodore Roosevelt. The E-2D was to play a larger role than that of the E-2C, with five E-2Ds aboard each carrier instead of the current four C-models, requiring the acquisition of 75 total E-2Ds. On 11 March 2015, the Theodore Roosevelt Carrier Strike Group departed Naval Station Norfolk and returned to port on 23 November 2015, concluding the first operational use of the E-2D.

In 2025, several E-2D Hawkeyes from the USS Gerald Ford were deployed north of Curacao and Aruba in the Caribbean, flying at 22,000 ft on 12 to 13 December 2025.

=== Other operators ===
E-2 Hawkeyes have been sold by the U.S. federal government under Foreign Military Sales procedures to the armed forces of Egypt, France, Israel, Japan, Singapore, and Taiwan.

==== Egypt ====
Egypt purchased five E-2C Hawkeyes that entered service in 1987 and were later upgraded to Hawkeye 2000 standard. One more upgraded E-2C was purchased afterward. The first upgraded aircraft was delivered in March 2003, and deliveries were concluded in late 2008. Egypt requested two additional excess E-2C aircraft in October 2007; deliveries began in 2010. They all operate in 601 AEW Brigade, Cairo-West.

Egypt used the E-2C Hawkeye in a bombing operation in 2015 against ISIL in Libya.

==== France ====
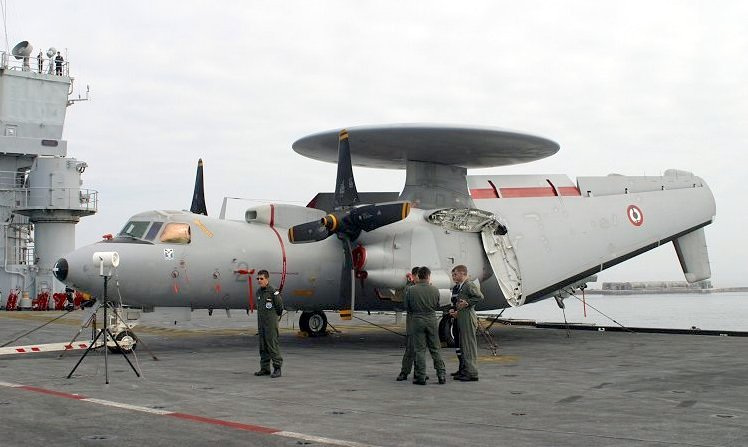
A French Navy Hawkeye with folded wings

The French Naval Aviation (Aeronavale) operates three E-2C Hawkeyes and has been the only operator of the E-2 Hawkeye from an aircraft carrier besides the USN. The French nuclear-powered carrier, Charles de Gaulle, currently carries two E-2C Hawkeyes on her combat patrols offshore. The third French E-2C Hawkeye has been upgraded with eight-bladed propellers as part of the NP2000 program. In April 2007, France requested the purchase of an additional aircraft.

The Flottille 4F of the French Navy's Aeronavale was stood up on 2 July 2000 and flies its E-2C Hawkeyes from its naval air station at Lann-Bihoue, deploying to the Charles de Gaulle. They took part in operations in Afghanistan and Libya.

In September 2019, Florence Parly, French Minister of the Armed Forces, announced that three new E-2D Advanced Hawkeyes would be purchased in 2020 to replace the E-2Cs in service.

In December 2024, France's first E-2D Hawkeye entered production, scheduled for delivery in 2027.

==== Japan ====
On 6 September 1976, Soviet Air Forces pilot Viktor Belenko successfully defected, landing his MiG-25 Foxbat at Hakodate Airport, Japan. During this incident, the Japan Self-Defense Forces' radar lost track of the aircraft when Belenko flew his MiG-25 at a low altitude, prompting it to consider procurement of AWACS aircraft.

Initially, the E-3 Sentry AWACS aircraft was considered to be the prime candidate for the airborne early warning mission by the Japan Self-Defense Force. However, the Japanese Defense Agency realized that the E-3 would not be readily available due to USAF needs and opted to procure E-2 Hawkeye aircraft. The Japan Air Self-Defense Force bought 13 E-2C aircraft to improve its early warning capabilities. The E-2C was put into service with the Airborne Early Warning Group at Misawa Air Base in January 1987.

On 21 November 2014, the Japanese Ministry of Defense officially decided to procure the E-2D version of the Hawkeye, instead of the Boeing 737 AEW&C design. In June 2015, the Japanese government requested to buy four E-2Ds through a Foreign Military Sale.

In September 2018 the Defense Security Cooperation Agency (DSCA) notified Congress of the possible sale of up to nine E-2Ds to Japan.

A sale of up to five E-2Ds for JASDF was approved by the U.S. State Department and DSCA notified Congress on 7 March 2023. The sale includes ancillary equipment, spares and training support for an estimated $1.38 billion. The proposed five E-2Ds are in addition to the six E-2Ds Japan already has and the seven more it has on order. However, the Japanese Ministry of Defense did not reveal in its most recent proposed budget any intention to acquire more aircraft.

==== Mexico ====
In 2004, three former Israel Air Force E-2C aircraft were sold to the Mexican Navy to perform maritime and shore-surveillance missions. These aircraft were upgraded locally by IAI. The first Mexican E-2C was rolled out in January 2004.

==== Singapore ====
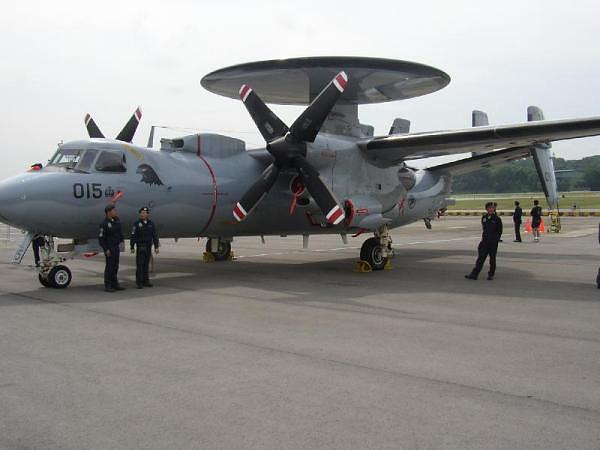
An E-2C Hawkeye of the RSAF from 111 Sqn on static display at Paya Lebar Air Base, 2006

The Republic of Singapore Air Force acquired four Grumman E-2C Hawkeye airborne early warning aircraft in 1987, which are assigned to the 111 Squadron "Jaeger" based at Tengah Air Base.

In April 2007, it was announced that the four E-2C Hawkeyes were to be replaced with four Gulfstream G550s, which would become the primary early warning aircraft of the Singapore Air Force. On 13 April 2012, the newer G550 AEWs officially took over duty from the former. Singapore has close ties with the Israel military which has also acquired the G550 AEW.

==== Israel ====
Israel was the first export customer; its four Hawkeyes were delivered during 1981, complete with the folding wings characteristic of carrier-borne aircraft.

The four examples were soon put into active service before and during the 1982 Lebanon War, during which they won a resounding victory over Syrian air defenses and fighter control. They were central to the Israeli victory in the air battles over the Bekaa Valley during which over 90 Syrian fighters were downed. The Hawkeyes were also the linchpins of the operation in which the Israeli Air Force (IAF) destroyed the surface-to-air missile array in the Bekaa, coordinating the various stages of the operation, vectoring planes into bombing runs and directing intercepts. Under constant escort by F-15 Eagles, there were always two Hawkeyes on station off the Lebanese coast, controlling the various assets in the air and detecting any Syrian aircraft upon their takeoff, eliminating any chance of surprise.

The IAF operated four E-2s for its homeland AEW protection through 1994. The IAF was the first user of the E-2 to install air-to-air refueling equipment.

Three of the four Israeli-owned Hawkeyes were sold to Mexico in 2002 after they had been upgraded with new systems; the remaining example was sent to be displayed in the Israeli Air Force Museum. In 2010, Singapore began retiring its E-2Cs, as well. Both Israel and Singapore now employ the Israel Aerospace Industries (IAI) Eitam, a Gulfstream G550-based platform with Elta's EL/W-2085 sensor package (a newer derivative of the airborne Phalcon system) for their national AEW programs.

==== Taiwan ====
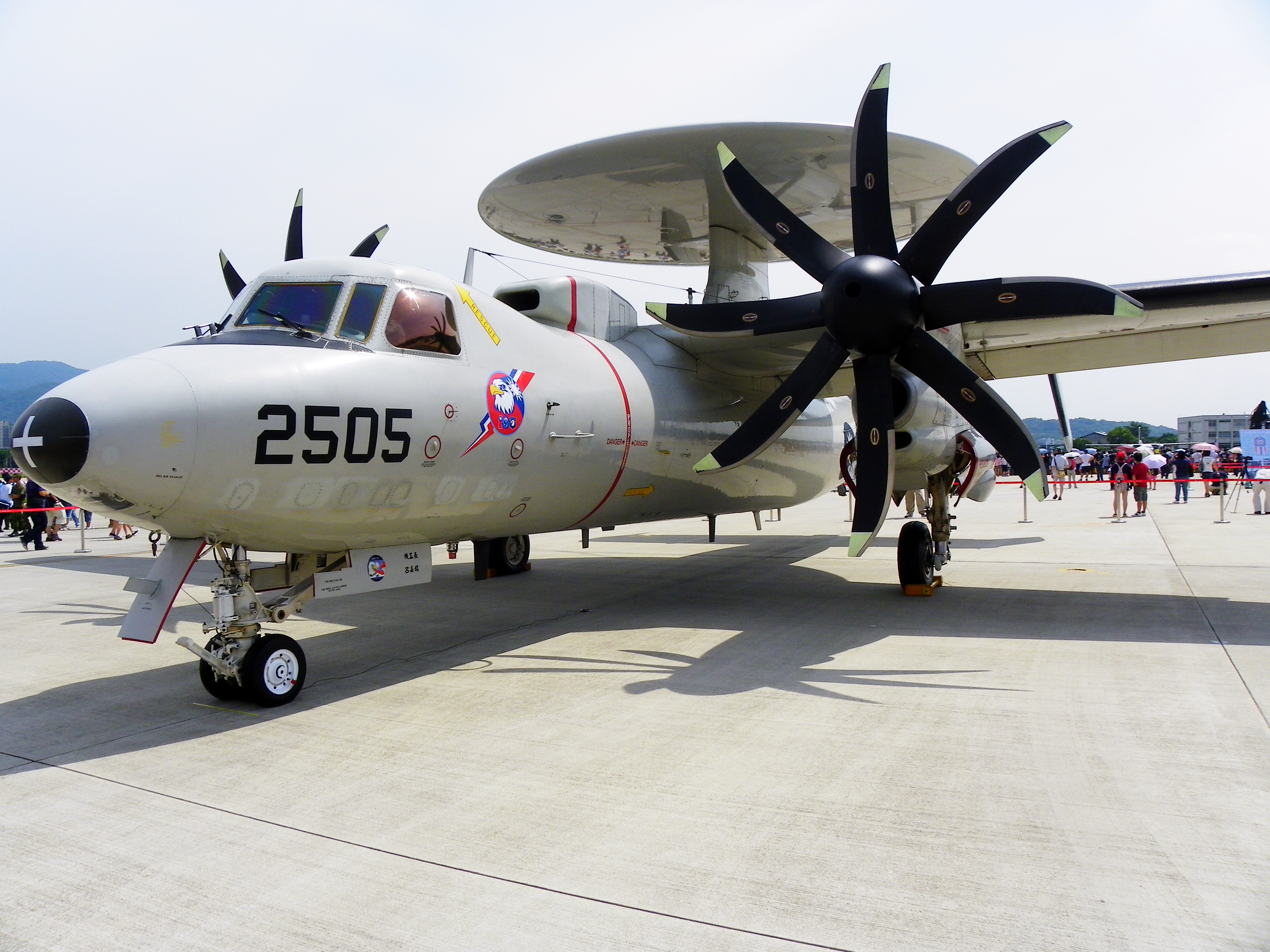
A ROCAF E-2K, the updated E-2T, at Songshan Air Force Base, 2011

Taiwan acquired four E-2T aircraft from the US in November 1995. In April 2006, Taiwan commissioned two new E-2K Hawkeyes at an official ceremony at the Republic of China Air Force base in Pingtung Airport in southern Taiwan.

The four E-2Ts were approved for upgrade to Hawkeye 2000 configuration in a 2008 arms deal. The four E-2T aircraft were upgraded to what became known as E-2K standard in two batches, the first batch of two aircraft were sent to the United States in June 2010, arriving home in late 2011; on their return, the second batch of two aircraft was sent for upgrade, returning to Taiwan in March 2013.

==== Offers ====
In August 2009, the USN and Northrop Grumman briefed the Indian Navy on the E-2D Advanced Hawkeye on its potential use to satisfy its current shore-based and future carrier-based airborne early warning and control requirements. The Indian Navy has reportedly expressed interest in acquiring up to six Hawkeyes.

== Variants ==
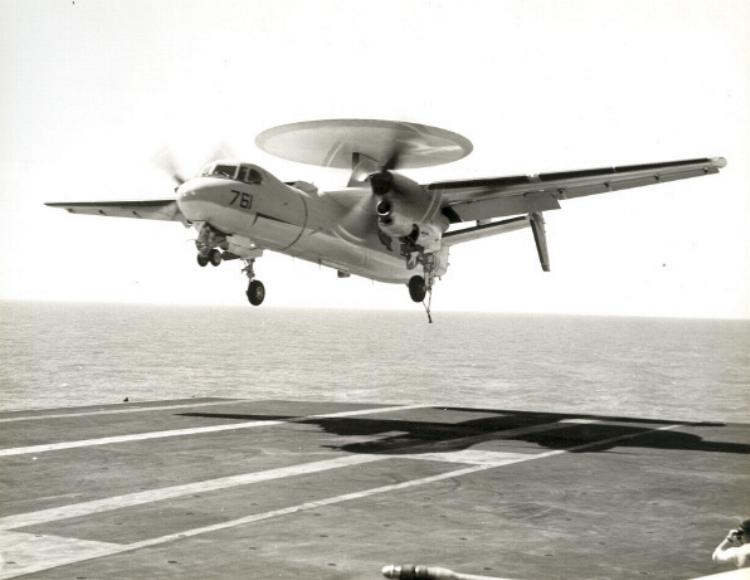
An E-2A of VAW-11 landing in 1966 on USS Coral Sea

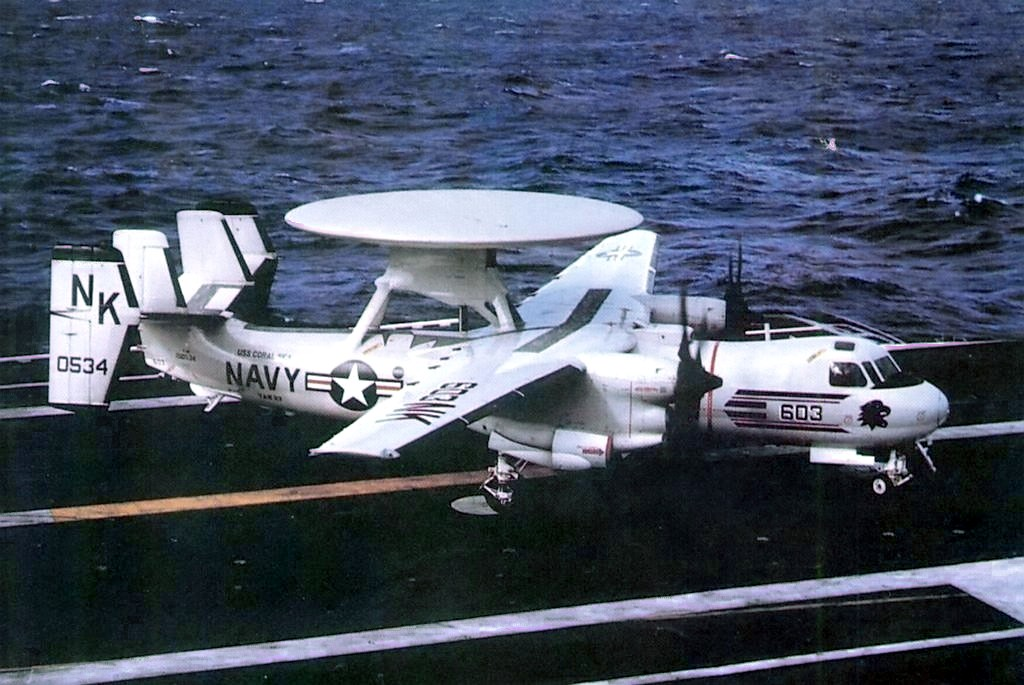
A VAW-113 E-2B after landing on USS Coral Sea in 1979

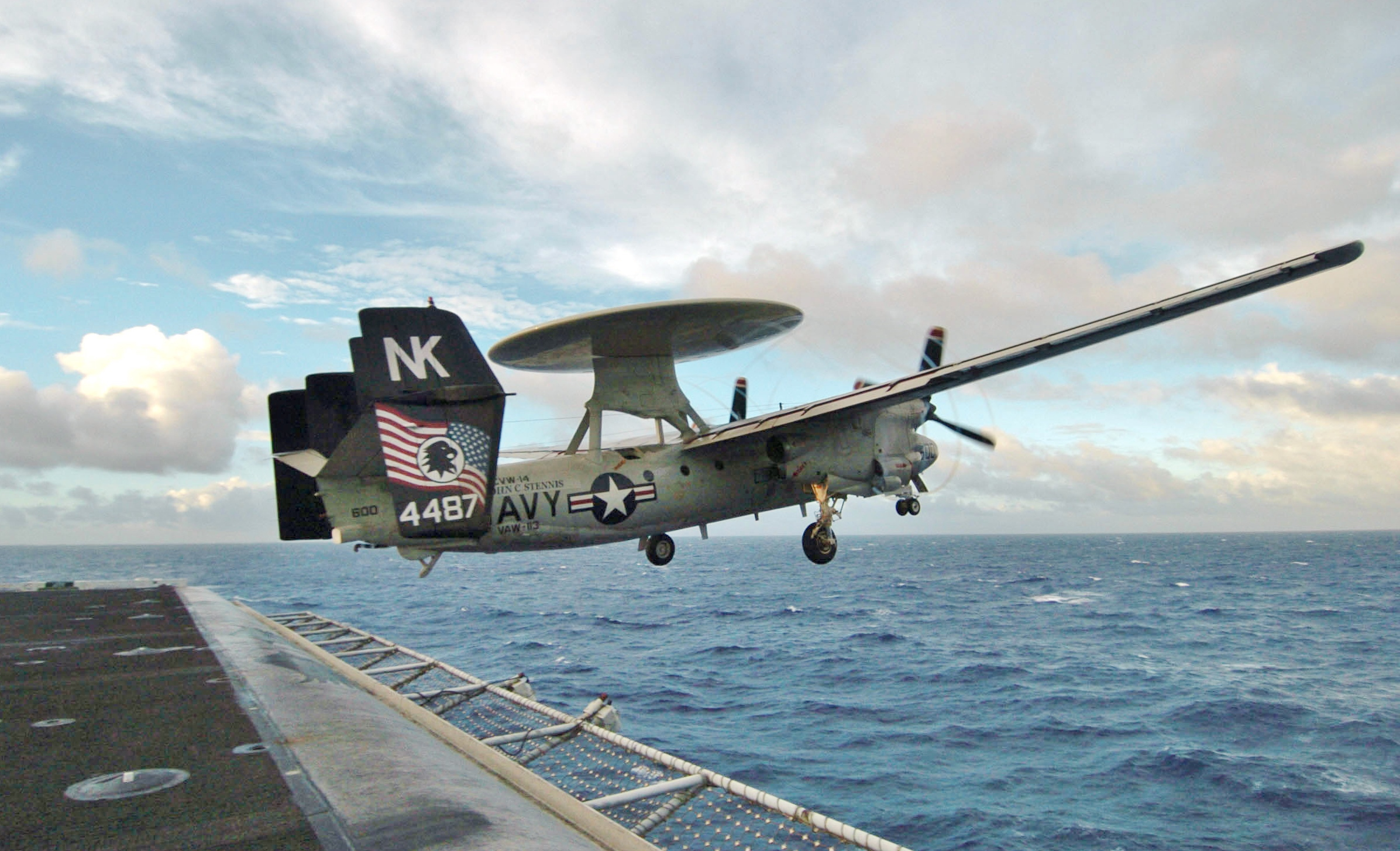
A U.S. Navy E-2C Hawkeye launches from USS John C. Stennis

W2F-1
Original designation of the Hawkeye, changed to E-2A in 1962.
E-2A
Initial production version, was W2F-1 before 1962. 59 built.
TE-2A
Two E-2As converted as crew trainers.
YC-2A
Two E-2As, BUNOs 148147 and 148148, converted as prototypes of the C-2 Greyhound
E-2B
As E-2A but fitted with improved computing, enlarged outer fins. 52 converted from E-2A.
YE-2C
Two E-2As, BUNOs 148712 and 148713, converted as E-2C prototypes. Designated as YE-2C and NE-2C respectively. These airframes then finished out their useful life being used as TE-2C pilot trainers.
E-2C
As the E-2B but with all new electronics, surveillance radar and search radar, 63 built. In "plus-models" the E-2C also has upgraded turboprop engines.

E-2C Group 0
Initial production version of E-2C, fitted with AN/APS-120 or AN/APS-125 radar. Lengthened nose compared to earlier versions

E-2C Group I

New radar (AN/APS-139), plus upgraded mission computer and upgraded engines. 18 new build aircraft.

E-2C Group 2

AN/APS-145 radar, further improved electronics.

E-2C Group 2 Plus (Nav Upgrade)

Avionics upgrade, inclusion of GPS into weapon system.

E-2C Hawkeye 2000

New mission computer, Cooperative Engagement Capability (CEC) and additional satellite communications aerial. Originally designated Group 2+.

E-2D
A variant with new avionics suite, improved engines, a new "glass cockpit" and the potential for air-to-air refueling.
E-2T/K
E-2C variant for Republic of China (Taiwan), with parts taken from retired E-2Bs (USN BuNos 151709, 151710, 151724, 152479). However, these aircraft have the same level of electronics as the E-2C Group II Hawkeyes with their APS-145 radars and are referred to as E-2T, with "T" standing for Taiwan. On July 31, 1999, Taiwan was approved to acquire two additional E-2s built to Hawkeye 2000 standard. Later, the four original E-2Ts were also upgraded to the same standard. The upgraded aircraft were referred to as E-2Ks.

== Operators ==
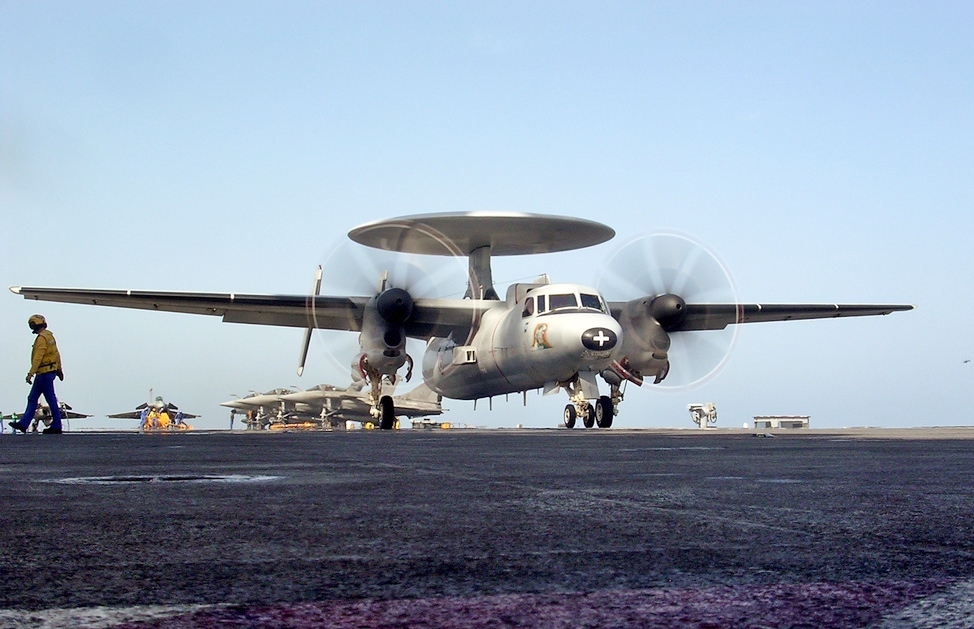
A French Naval Aviation Hawkeye preparing to be catapulted from the French aircraft carrier Charles De Gaulle.

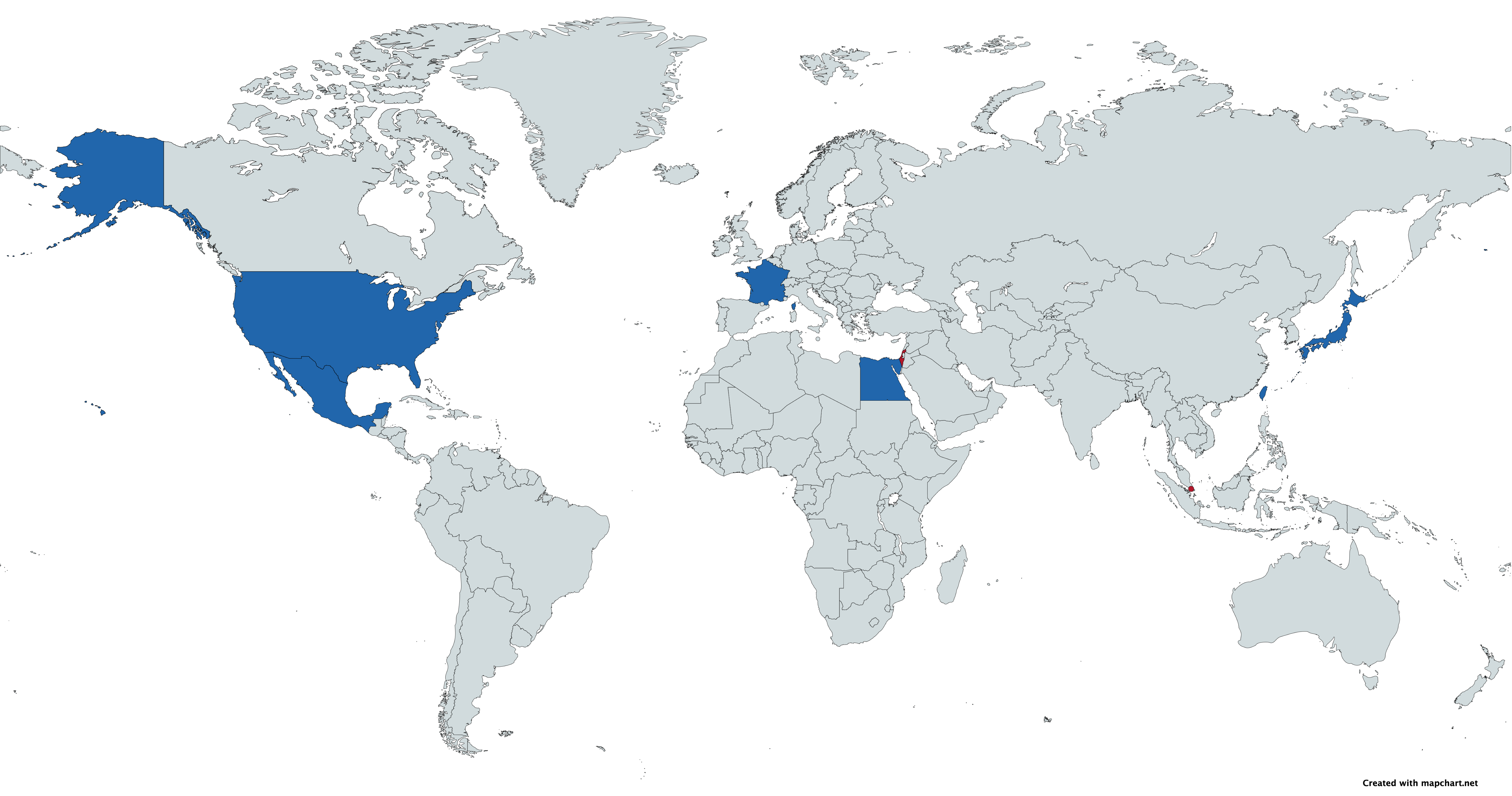
A map of current operators of the E-2 Hawkeye in blue and former operators in red

Egypt

- Egyptian Air Force
  - 87 Squadron

France

- French Navy
  - Flottille 4F (E-2C Hawkeye 2000)

Japan

- Japan Air Self-Defense Force: As of March 2023, the JASDF operated 10 E-2Cs and 6 E-2Ds.
  - 601st Squadron (E-2C) & (E-2D)
  - 603rd Squadron (E-2C) & (E-2D)

Mexico

- Mexican Navy
  - 1st Early Warning and Reconnaissance Naval Air Squadron

Republic of China

- Republic of China Air Force
  - 6th Mixed Wing

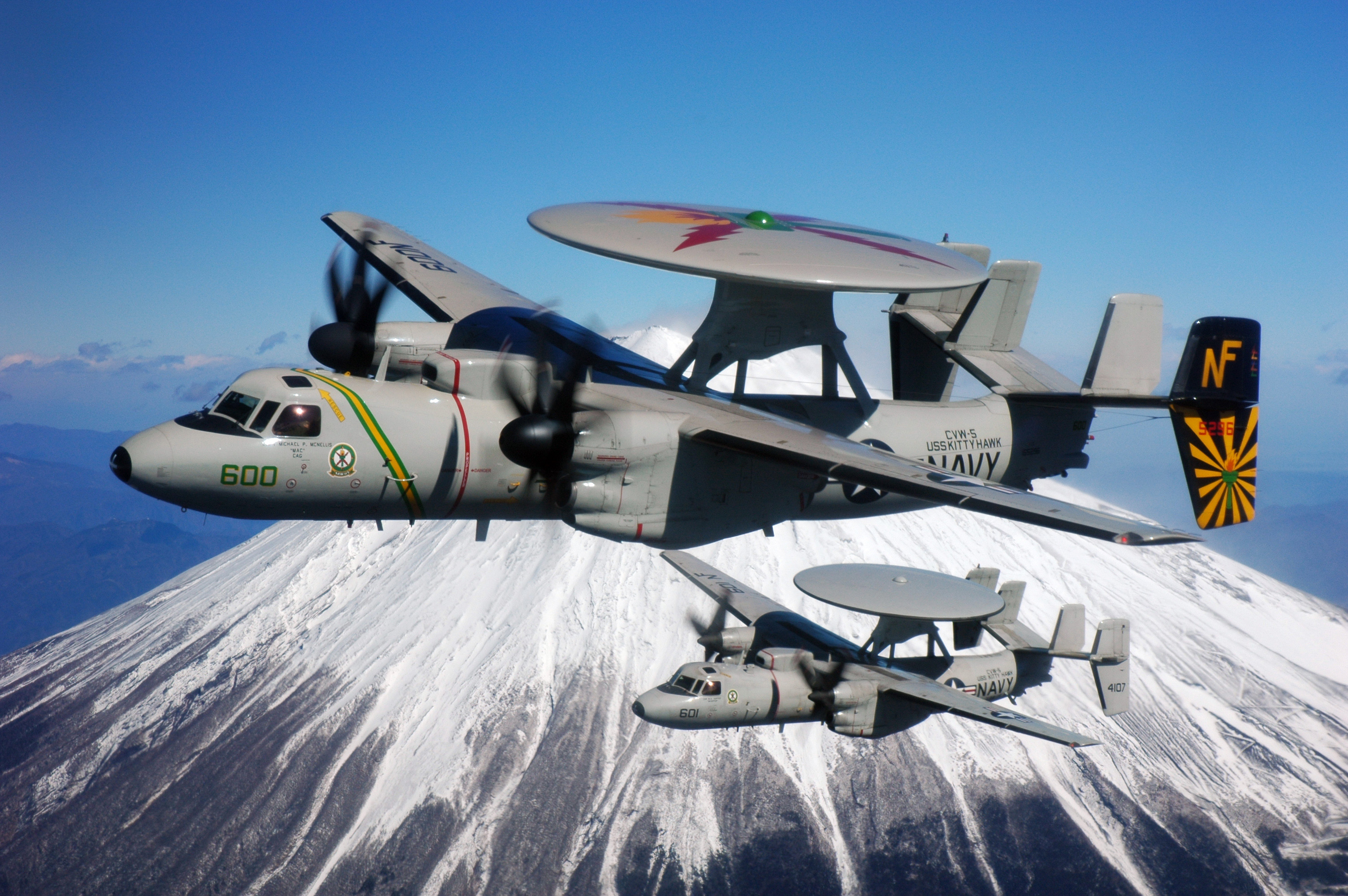
Two US Navy E-2C Hawkeyes of VAW-115 flying by Mount Fuji, Japan

United States

- United States Navy
  - VAW-113
  - VAW-115
  - VAW-116
  - VAW-117
  - VAW-120
  - VAW-121
  - VAW-123
  - VAW-124
  - VAW-125
  - VAW-126
  - VX-20
  - VX-30
  - VX-1
  - Carrier Airborne Early Warning Weapons School

=== Former operators ===
Israel

- Israeli Air Force
  - 192 Squadron

Singapore

- Republic of Singapore Air Force
  - 111 Squadron

United States

- U.S. Coast Guard
- U.S. Navy (decommissioned squadrons)
  - VAW-11
  - VAW-12
  - VAW-77
  - VAW-78
  - VAW-88
  - VAW-110
  - VAW-112
  - VAW-114
  - VAW-122
  - VAW-127

== Aircraft on display ==
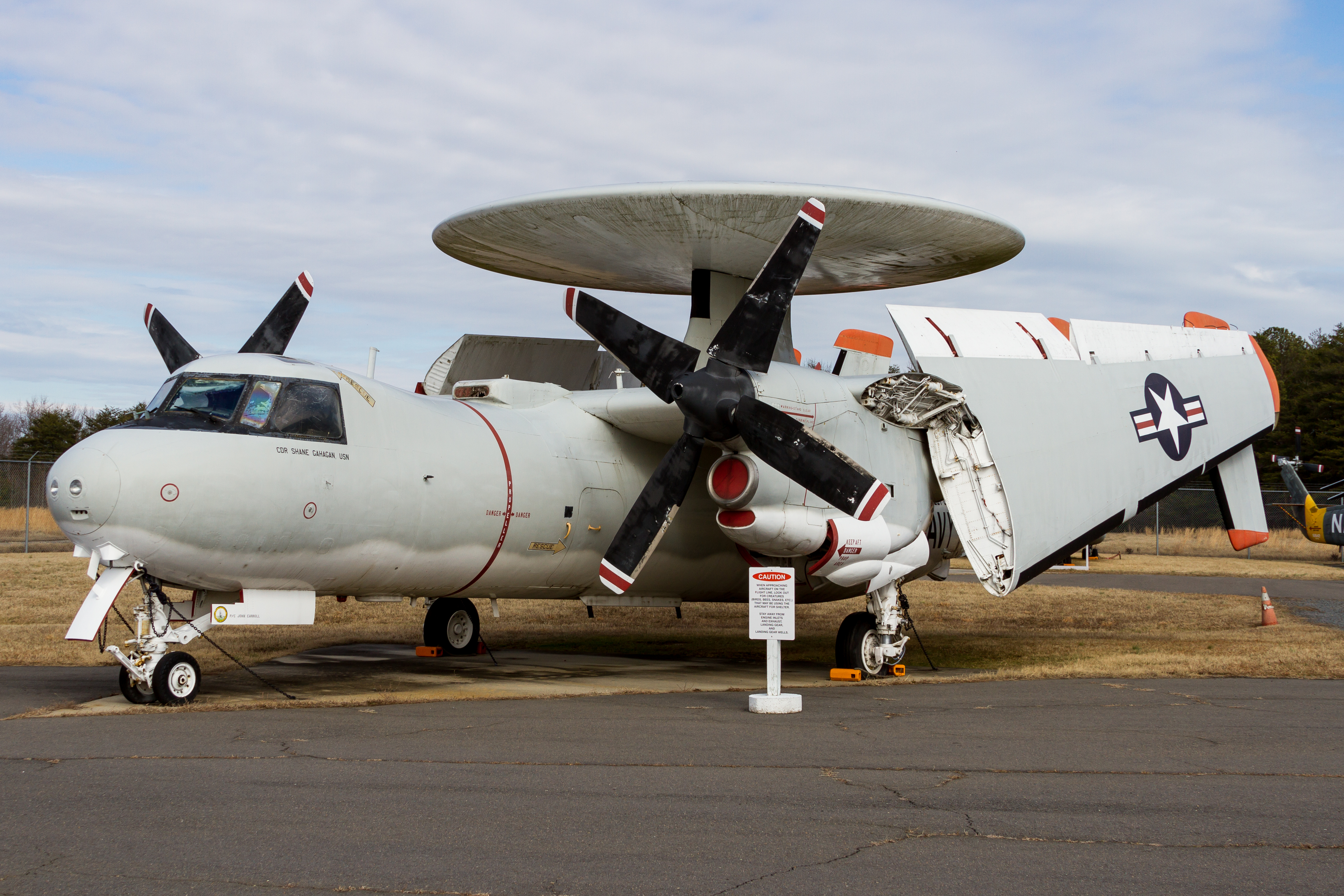
An E-2 Hawkeye at the Patuxent River Naval Air Museum.

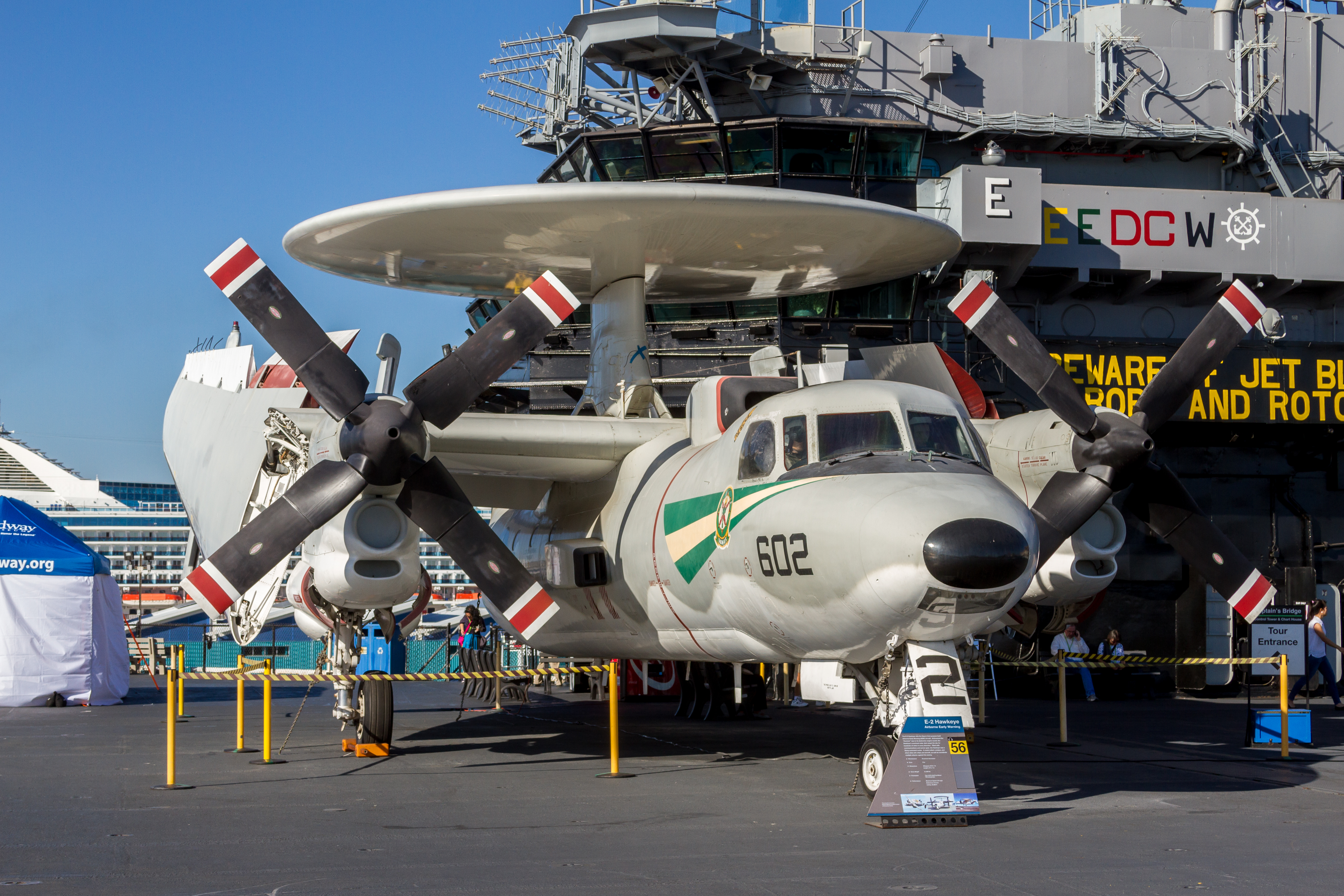
An E-2 Hawkeye at the USS Midway Museum.

- E-2B, BuNo 150540, National Naval Aviation Museum, Naval Air Station Pensacola, Florida
- E-2B, BuNo 152476, Patuxent River Naval Air Museum, NAS Patuxent River, Maryland
- E-2B, BuNo 152484, Air Victory Museum, Lumberton, New Jersey
- E-2B, BuNo 150541, NAS Norfolk Air Park (adjacent Gate 4), Naval Station Norfolk/Chambers Field (former NAS Norfolk), Virginia. Early E-2C variant nose cap installed for static display.
- E-2C, BuNo 159496, Naval Air Station Fallon, Nevada.
- E-2C, BuNo 159499, nose section painted as 163849, on base at Naval Air Station Patuxent River, Maryland
- E-2C, BuNo 160012, Garden City, NY as part of Cradle of Aviation Museum
- E-2C, 944, Israeli Air Force Museum, Hatzerim Air Base, Israel
- E-2C, BuNo 160992, on base memorial display, NAS Point Mugu, California
- E-2C, BuNo 161227, flight deck display aboard USS Midway Museum, San Diego, California
- E-2C, BuNo 161098, on display at former NAS Atlanta, GA
- E-2C, BuNo 161344, on display at the Yanks Air Museum, Chino, CA
- E-2C, BuNo 162796, Singapore Air Force Museum, Singapore
- E-2C, BuNo 164494, National Naval Aviation Museum, Naval Air Station Pensacola, FL. This aircraft was the last to launch from USS Enterprise prior to her inactivation.

== Specifications (E-2C) ==
E-2C Hawkeye 3-view image

Data from US Navy fact file, E-2D Storybook

General characteristics

- Crew: 5: pilot, copilot, radar officer (RO), combat information center officer (CICO), aircraft control officer (ACO)
- Length: 57 ft 8 3/4 in (17.596 m)
- Wingspan: 80 ft 7 in (24.56 m)
- Height: 18 ft 3 3/4 in (5.582 m) : Radome could retract by 2 feet (0.6 m) to fit into the 17 ft 6 in (5.33 m) clear height hangar of Essex and Midway class carriers. Retraction function no longer used.
- Wing area: 700 sq ft (65 m^{2})
- Aspect ratio: 9.15
- Airfoil: root: NACA 63A216; tip: NACA 63A414
- Empty weight: 40,200 lb (18,234 kg)
- Gross weight: 43,068 lb (19,535 kg)
- Max takeoff weight: 57,500 lb (26,082 kg)
- Powerplant: 2 × Allison/Rolls-Royce T56-A-427 (E-2C), T56-A-427A (E-2D) turboprop, 5,100 shp (3,800 kW) each

Performance

- Maximum speed: 350 kn (400 mph, 650 km/h)
- Cruise speed: 256 kn (295 mph, 474 km/h)
- Ferry range: 1,462 nmi (1,682 mi, 2,708 km)
- Endurance: 6 hours (8 hours land-based)
- Service ceiling: 34,700 ft (10,600 m)
- Wing loading: 72.7 lb/sq ft (355 kg/m^{2})
- Power/mass: 0.19 hp/lb (0.31 kW/kg)

Avionics

- AN/AAS-36 FLIR
- AN/ACQ-5 TADIL-A/Link 11 modem
- AN/ALR-73 Passive Detection System (PDS) electronic support measures (ESM) set
- AN/ALQ-78 radar threat detection/surveillance/direction finding system
- AN/APS-115 Radar
- AN/APS-145 Radar
- AN/APX-72 IFF transponder
- AN/APX-100 IFF Transponder
- AN/ARC-158 UHF radio
- AN/ARC-182 UHF/VHF radio
- AN/ARQ-34 HF radio
- AN/ASQ-81 Magnetic Anomaly Detector (MAD)
- AN/AYK-14 computer
- AN/USC-42 Mini-DAMA SATCOM system
- OL-483/AP IFF interrogator system
- OL-698/ASQ Tactical Computer Group

== See also ==
Related development

- Grumman E-1 Tracer
- Grumman C-2 Greyhound

Aircraft of comparable role, configuration, and era

- Airborne Surveillance Platform (Airavat)
- Boeing E-3 Sentry
- Boeing E-767
- Fairey Gannet AEW.3
- Hawker Siddeley P.139B
- Lockheed P-3 AEW
- Shaanxi KJ-200
- Xian JZY-01 / KJ-600
- Yakovlev Yak-44

Related lists

- List of military electronics of the United States
