= VAW-115 =

US Navy squadron

Liberty Bells
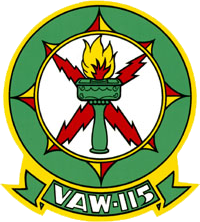
- VAW-115 insignia
- Active: 20 April 1967 – present
- Country: United States
- Branch: United States Navy
- Type: Airborne early warning and control
- Role: Provides airborne command and control, battle management, and surveillance as the "tactical quarterback in the sky" for carrier strike groups.
- Part of: Attached to Carrier Air Wing CVW 11
- Garrison/HQ: Naval Air Station Point Mugu
- Nicknames: "Liberty Bells" "Snapper"
- Mottos: "We Are, Liberty Bells!" "Everyone Loves a Hummer!"
- Colors: Green, Red, White
- Mascot: Liberty Bell
- Engagements: Vietnam War; Gulf War; Operation Southern Watch; Third Taiwan Strait Crisis; Operation Enduring Freedom; Iraq War; Northern Edge; Operation Prosperity Guardian; Operation Poseidon Archer

Commanders
- Current commander: CO: CDR Gerry "Atric” Armstrong; XO: CDR Conor "Mittens" Boe; CMC: CMDCM John Shubert

Aircraft flown
- E-2A/B/C/D Hawkeye / Advanced Hawkeye

Airborne Command and Control Squadron 115 (VAW-115), also known as the "Liberty Bells", is a United States Navy airborne early warning and control squadron that flies the E-2D Advanced Hawkeye.

== Squadron history ==
The squadron was originally established as Carrier Airborne Early Warning Squadron 115 (VAW-115) on 20 April 1967, flying the E-2A Hawkeye. It was assigned to Attack Carrier Wing 2 and deployed on board USS Ranger.

=== 1970s ===
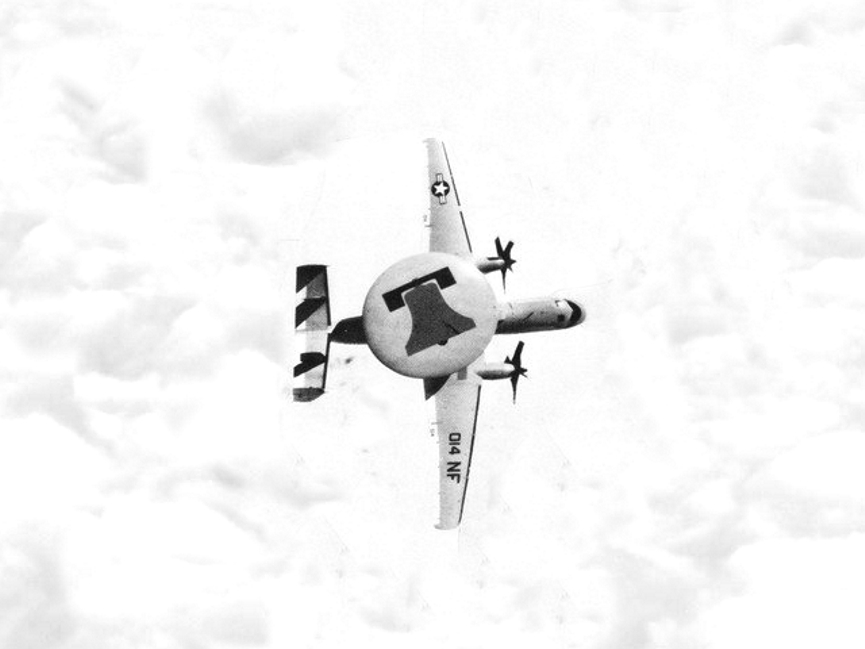
VAW-115 E-2B in flight in 1974

VAW-115 transitioned to the E-2B and joined CVW-5 in 1971 and made two combat deployments to the Gulf of Tonkin between May 1971 and April 1973 on board USS Midway. In September 1973, CVW-5 moved to Yokosuka, Japan as a component of the Forward Deployed Naval Forces, and the only air wing home ported outside the continental United States.

VAW-115 E-2B Hawkeyes performed a command and control role in Operation Frequent Wind, supporting the evacuation of Saigon in April 1975. VAW-115 made eleven deployments to the Indian Ocean and North Arabian Sea, a period which saw such tumultuous events as the Iranian seizure of the American Embassy in Tehran.

=== 1980s ===
In 1983, VAW-115 participated in rescue and salvage operations following the Korean Air Lines Flight 007 shootdown. Two years later, the squadron received the E-2C as part of the forward deployed naval forces (FDNF) based in Atsugi, Japan, attached to CVW-5. VAW-115 then supported Freedom of Navigation operations, both for USS Oldendorf in the Sea of Japan and for Operation Earnest Will, protecting Kuwaiti re-flagged tankers through the Straits of Hormuz. During the 1989-90 deployments with the Midway Battle Group, the squadron and their E-2C Hawkeyes participated in Operation Classic Resolve, supporting the democratic government of the Philippines against a coup attempt.

=== 1990s ===
In response to the Iraqi Invasion of Kuwait, VAW-115 deployed to the Persian Gulf in October 1990 as part of Operation Desert Shield. In January 1991, Desert Shield transitioned to Desert Storm and saw VAW-115 flying 179 combat sorties. In August 1991, USS Midway was decommissioned and CVW-5 embarked on USS Independence. During the ensuing years, the squadron deployed to the Persian Gulf four times in support of Operation Southern Watch, enforcing a No-Fly Zone over the skies of southern Iraq. In January 1998, VAW-115 and the Independence Battle Group were called upon to participate in various Persian Gulf contingency operations in support of United Nations sanctions. After transitioning to the E-2C Group II Navigation Upgrade aircraft, VAW-115 cross-decked with CVW-5 to USS Kitty Hawk in mid 1998.

=== 2000s ===
In February 2003, the squadron was once again called to the Persian Gulf to support Operation Southern Watch and flew 46 combat sorties until the commencement of Operation Iraqi Freedom in March 2003. During that operation, the squadron flew 363.8 hours in support of Army and Marine Corps units on the ground.

In the years that followed, VAW-115 participated in exercises such as Valiant Shield, Malabar, and Talisman Saber as well as Exercises Annualex and Keen Sword with the Japanese Air and Maritime Self Defense Forces. VAW-115 took part in joint and multi-national RIMPAC 2008, providing Airborne Battle Space Command and Control to 49 naval vessels, 150 aircraft, and 29 other foreign and U.S. units from 10 participating countries.

=== 2010s ===
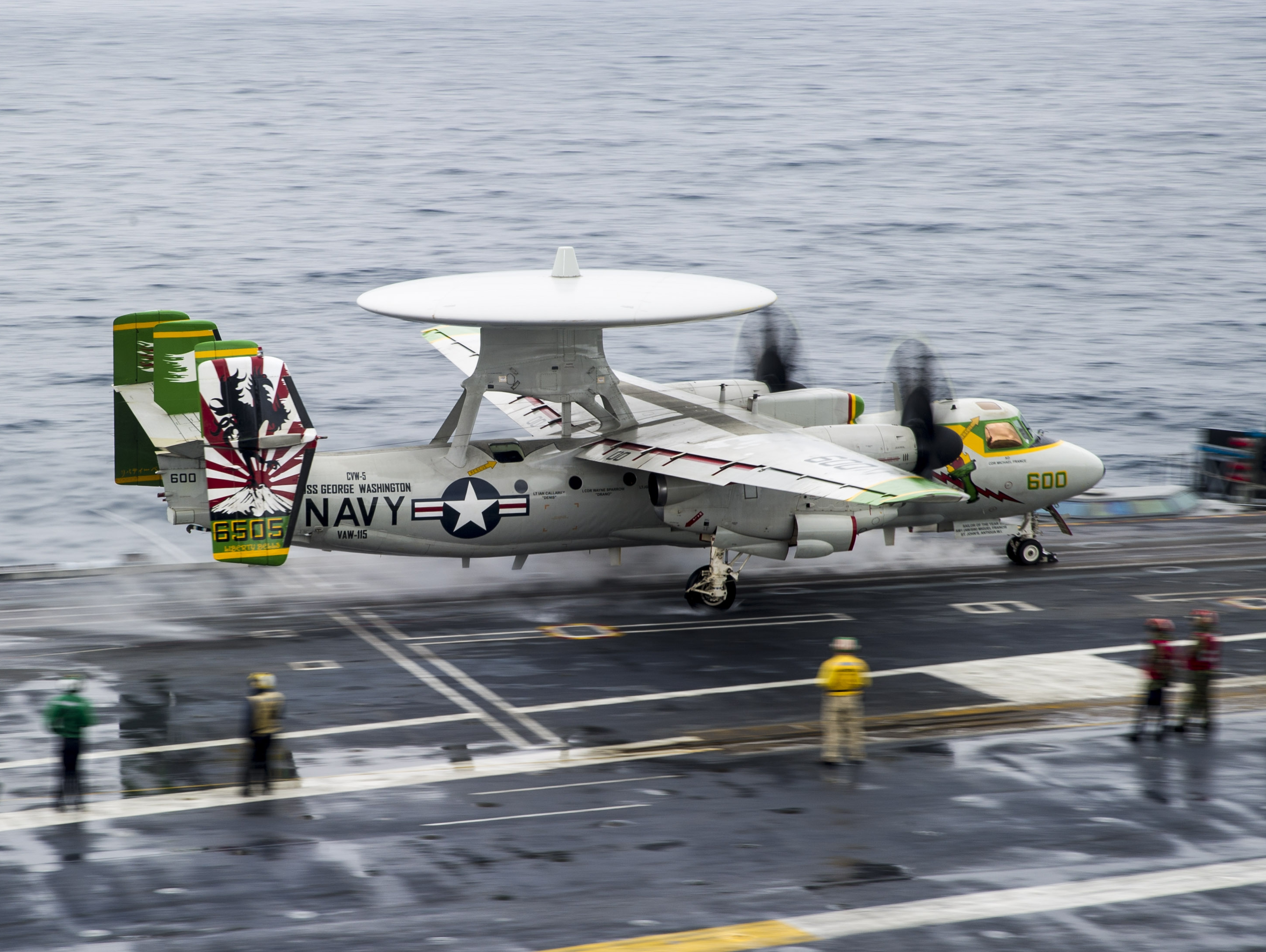
VAW-115 E-2C is launched from USS George Washington in July 2014.

In February 2010 the squadron began reequipping with the E-2C Hawkeye 2000. The improved E-2C Hawkeye 2000 carries advanced capabilities over its predecessor in the areas of detection, processing, identification, communication and navigation.

VAW-115 has achieved 24 years and 50,000 hours of Class-A mishap-free flight hours receiving eight Battle Efficiency "E" awards, seven AEW Excellence awards, and six Safety "S" awards.

On 2 February 2017, VAW-125 arrived at Marine Corps Air Station Iwakuni, Japan to replace VAW-115 in Carrier Air Wing Five aboard the aircraft carrier USS Ronald Reagan. In the summer of 2017 the squadron moved to Naval Air Station Point Mugu after 44 years of deployment with the Japanese Self Defense Forces.

=== 2020s ===
On 1 January 2020 all VAW-squadrons were redesignated Airborne Command and Control Squadron. The VAW-115 participated two forward deployments attached to CVW-11 onboard the USS Theodore Roosevelt (CVN-71) in 2020 and 2021. In 2022, VAW-115 transitioned to the E-2D Advanced Hawkeye.

== Aircraft ==
- Grumman E-2A (20 April 1967 - )
- Grumman E-2B
- Grumman E-2C (1985-2017)
- Grumman E-2D Advanced Hawkeye (2022 - Present)

== See also ==
- History of the United States Navy
- List of United States Navy aircraft squadrons
