= Exercise Summer Pulse =

2004 U.S. Navy worldwide surge deployment

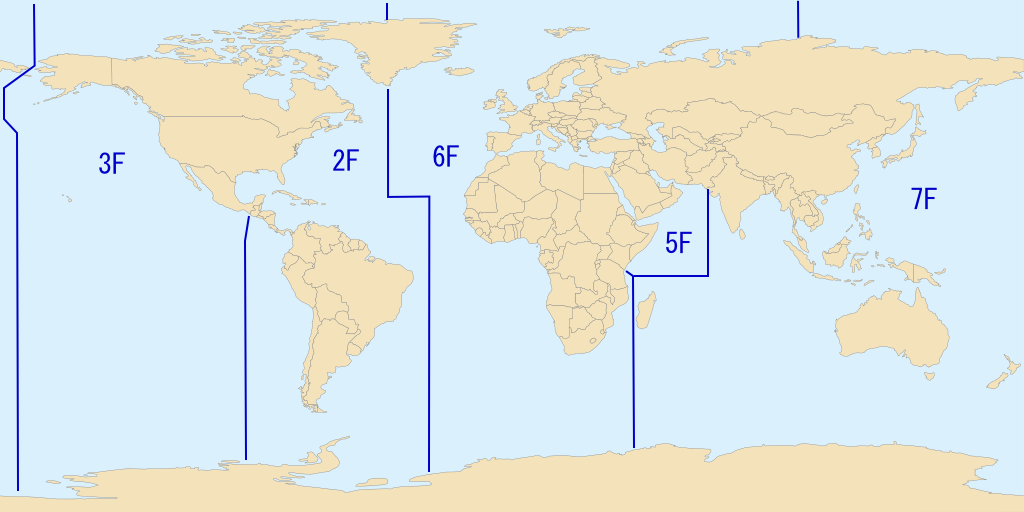
- U.S. Navy numbered fleets (2004)
- Type: Carrier strike group operations
- Location: World-wide
- Planned by: U.S. Fleet Forces Command
- Objective: First operational test of U.S. Navy Fleet Response Plan
- Date: 2 June to 27 July 2004 (Note: The original announcements called for Summer Pulse to begin in early June and concluded in August. The actual underway period for the various aircraft carriers involved in Summer Pulse 2004 are based upon their 2004 command histories and/or entry in the Dictionary of American Naval Fighting Ships.)
- Executed by: United States Navy

Summer Pulse 2004 (SP04) was the codename for a worldwide surge deployment that served as the first full-scale test of the United States Navy's then-new Fleet Response Plan (FRP). During Summer Pulse 2004, a total of seven carrier strike groups were underway at the same time in five different Numbered fleet areas of responsibility. This number of underway carrier strike groups had not been matched since the six carrier battle groups deployed during Operation Desert Storm. In addition to the carriers, the Navy also deployed 17 submarines and one submarine tender.

The FRP was designed to allow the Navy to provide up to seven carrier strike groups (CSG) to support any contingency worldwide in 30 days. The plan allowed for two more CSGs to be ready within three months to reinforce or relieve the forces initially deployed. This allows for a continuous presence and the ability to swiftly respond to different crisis situations. Summer Pulse 2004 also allowed the U.S. Navy to exercise the logistics and shore infrastructure needed to execute a large-scale surge operation, as well as the operational concepts in its Sea Power 21 strategy.

During Summer Pulse 2004, U.S. naval forces participated in over 13 individual military exercises involving more than 23 allies and coalition partners, as well as other branches of the U.S. Armed Forces, while operating in the Atlantic and Pacific Oceans; the Arabian, Baltic, Mediterranean, North and Red Seas; and the Sea of Japan and Persian Gulf.

== Background ==
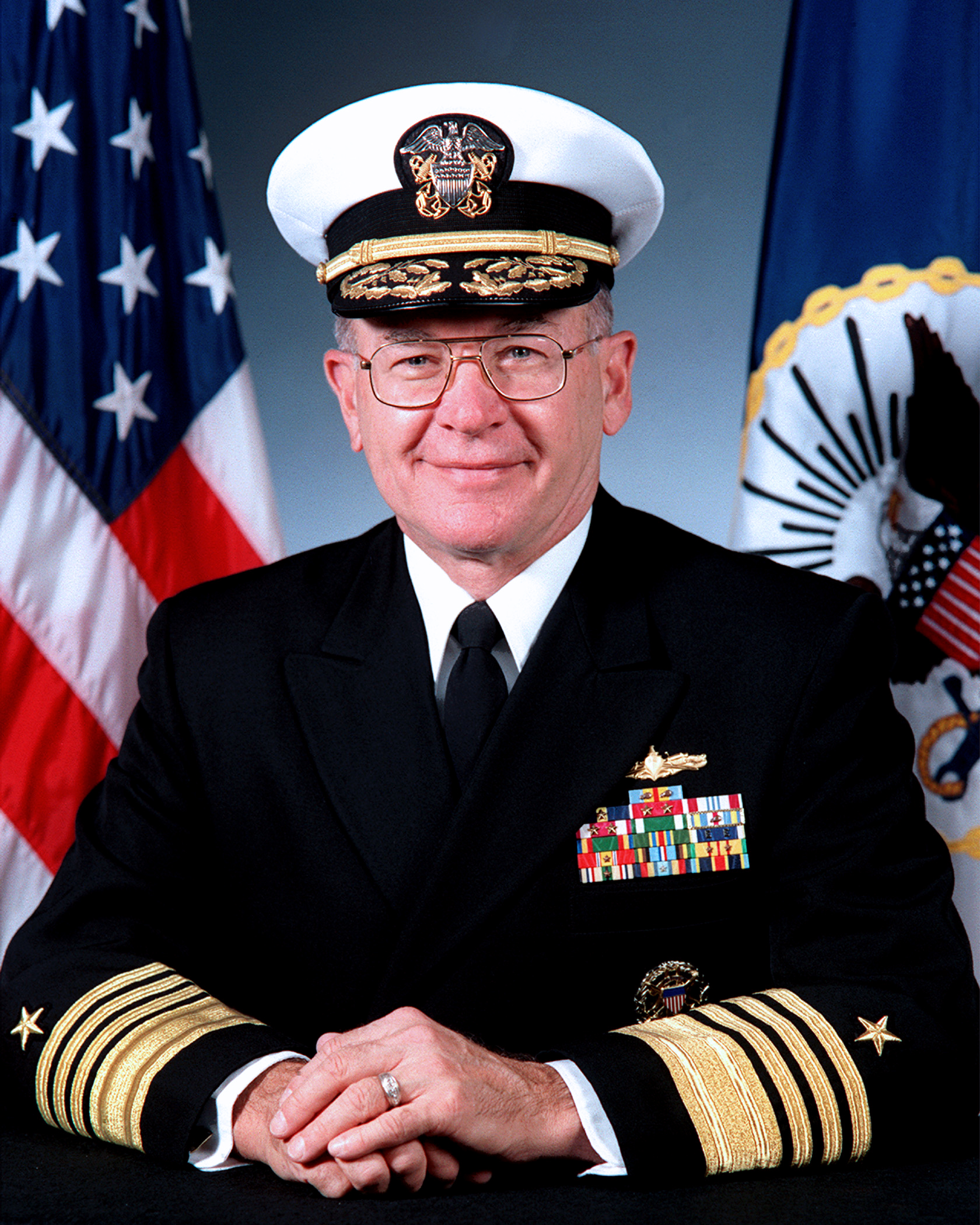
Admiral Vern Clark, USN

Developing upon the lessons learned from the 2003 invasion of Iraq and the War on terrorism, the U.S. Navy introduced the Fleet Response Plan in 2003. The FRP was described as a new concept of planning and organizing fleet assets for deployment that replaced the 18-month Inter-Deployment Readiness Cycle used during the Cold War. The objective of the FRP was to provide six aircraft carrier strike groups that can be deployed or be ready to deploy within 30 days and another two aircraft carrier strike groups ready to deploy within 90 days. Chief of Naval Operations Admiral Vern Clark (pictured) summarized the objective of the Fleet Response Plan by noting:

I would rather muster two battle groups for three months and do something really significant internationally, and cooperate with partners in training and so forth, than just go over and hang out for six months without purpose. The position that I’m pushing is that we should be less interested in presence and more interested in presence with a purpose.

The Fleet Response Plan allowed the U.S. Navy to be ready to surge as well as be able to vary the lengths of deployments, providing a more flexible, ready to deploy capability. By increasing the duration of time that a ship could be deployed, the operational availability of several ships will always overlap, providing the Navy with the capability of deploying multiple ships or battle groups simultaneously. The FRP also involved new ways of operating, training, manning, and maintaining the fleet, resulting in increased force readiness and the ability to provide significant combat power in a crisis situation as well as reinforce U.S. relationships and interoperability in five theaters of operations. The U.S. Fleet Forces Command was tasked to lead in the implementation of the FRP.

== Theaters of operations ==
=== U.S. Second Fleet: Western Atlantic and Latin America ===
==== Gringo-Gaucho ====
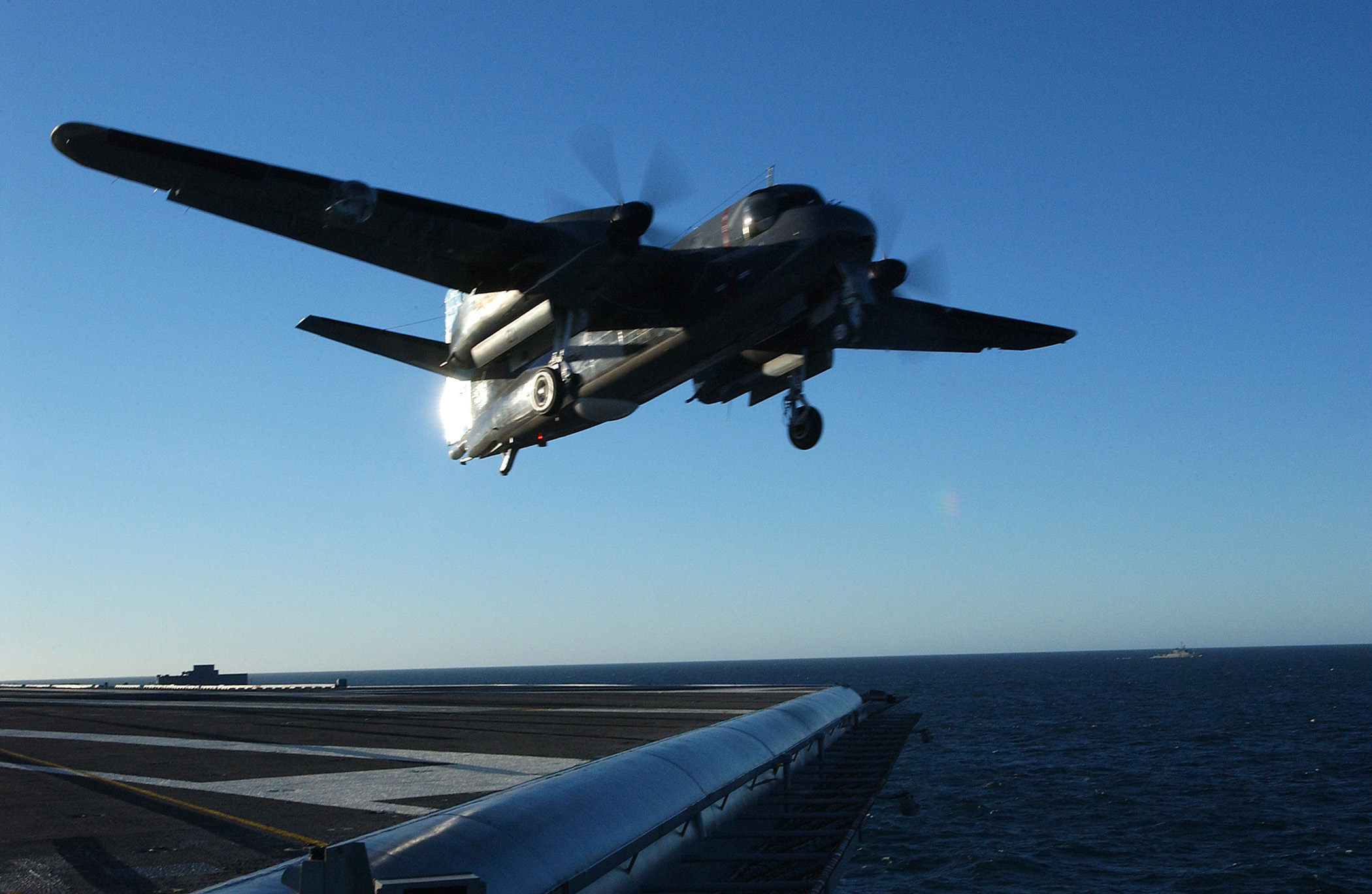
Gringo-Gaucho

On 27 May 2004, the carrier Ronald Reagan departed from its former home base of Naval Station Norfolk, Virginia, which was also the headquarters for the U.S. Second Fleet. During its two-month-long inter-fleet transfer, Reagan participated in Summer Pulse 2004, as well as operating with the U.S. Southern Command and U.S. Northern Command, within the U.S. Second Fleet's area of responsibility. (Note: "Second Fleet ... operates along both coasts of South America and part of the west coast of Central America. In all, it covers more than 38 million square miles." See Numbered Fleets, Federation of American Scientists.) During this inter-fleet transfer, several squadrons of Carrier Air Wing Eleven (CVW-11) were temporarily embarked on board the Ronald Reagan. The principal purpose for embarking these CVW-11 squadrons was to complete their training evolutions prior to the strike group's first Western Pacific (WESTPAC) deployment.

On 17 June 2004, two Super Étendard jet fighters and three S-2T Turbo Trackers antisubmarine aircraft from Argentine Naval Aviation carried out touch-and-go landings on the Reagan's flight deck during Gringo-Gaucho exercises (pictured). The Reagan also participated in a SIFOREX (Silent Forces) exercise with the Peruvian Navy prior to its port visit to Callao, Peru, on 9 July 2004. The most significant naval exercise involving the Ronald Reagan Carrier Battle Group was UNITAS 45-04, the largest multinational naval exercise held in Latin America. Joining the carrier Reagan and Carrier Air Wing Eleven (CVW-11) were the guided-missile cruiser Thomas S. Gates, the dock landing ship Tortuga, and the guided-missile destroyers Mustin and Benfold.

Reagan subsequently paid port visits to Valparaíso, Chile, and Callao, Peru, before arriving at its new homeport of Naval Air Station North Island, California, on 23 July 2004, having changed its operational control ("chop") to the U.S. Third Fleet. (Note: This term is a compound of CHOP, which is short for Change of Operational Control. A CHOP line is a line at which operational control of forces transfers from one command to another. Sean Maloney thesis, To Secure the Command of the Sea, University of New Brunswick, 1991, p. iii.)

==== Operation Blinding Storm ====
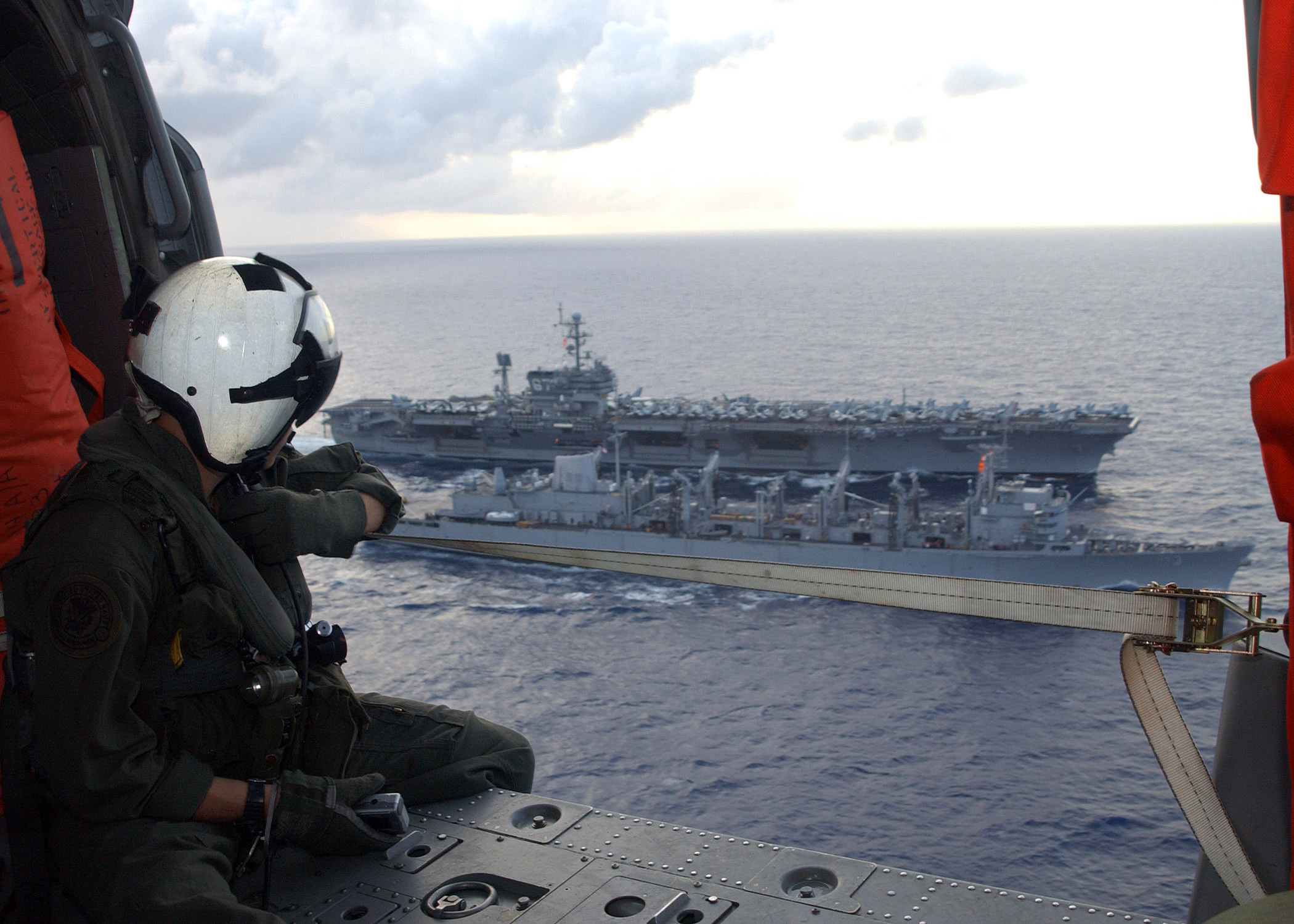
Operation Blinding Storm (11 June 2004)

On 7 June 2004, the John F. Kennedy carrier strike group (probably Carrier Group 6) departed Naval Station Mayport, Florida, to participate in Combined Joint Task Force Exercise 04-2 – "Operation Blinding Storm", to complete the strike group's certification to deploy.

Held between 14 and 18 June, Blinding Storm marked the first Joint National Training Capability (JNTC) integration event, with training focused on functional coalition component commands. All branches of the U.S. armed forces were involved, as well as the British light aircraft carrier Invincible. A total of 28,000 allied military personnel participated in Operation Blinding Storm, including and more than 60 coalition ships and hundreds of aircraft. Coordinating the complex command and control links encompassing land, amphibious, air and maritime forces was one of the exercise's wins. It included an opposed night amphibious landing and live fire exercises, concluding on 21 June 2004. That day, the John F. Kennedy carrier strike group was certified as being combat ready for its upcoming deployment.

Following Blinding Storm, John F. Kennedy carrier strike group began its overseas deployment. The carrier strike group paid a port visit to Malta between 26 and 30 June 2004, before transiting the Suez Canal from 2–3 July 2004, joining the U.S. Fifth Fleet. The nuclear-powered attack submarine Toledo deployed with the John F. Kennedy carrier strike group during Summer Pulsie 2004.

=== U.S. Third Fleet: Northern and Central Pacific ===
On 24 May 2004, Carrier Group 7, led by John C. Stennis, departed Naval Station San Diego, California, for its 2004 Western Pacific (WESTPAC) deployment as part of Summer Pulse 2004. The nuclear-powered submarine Salt Lake City deployed with the John C. Stennis strike group during Summer Pulse 2004.

==== Northern Edge 2004 ====
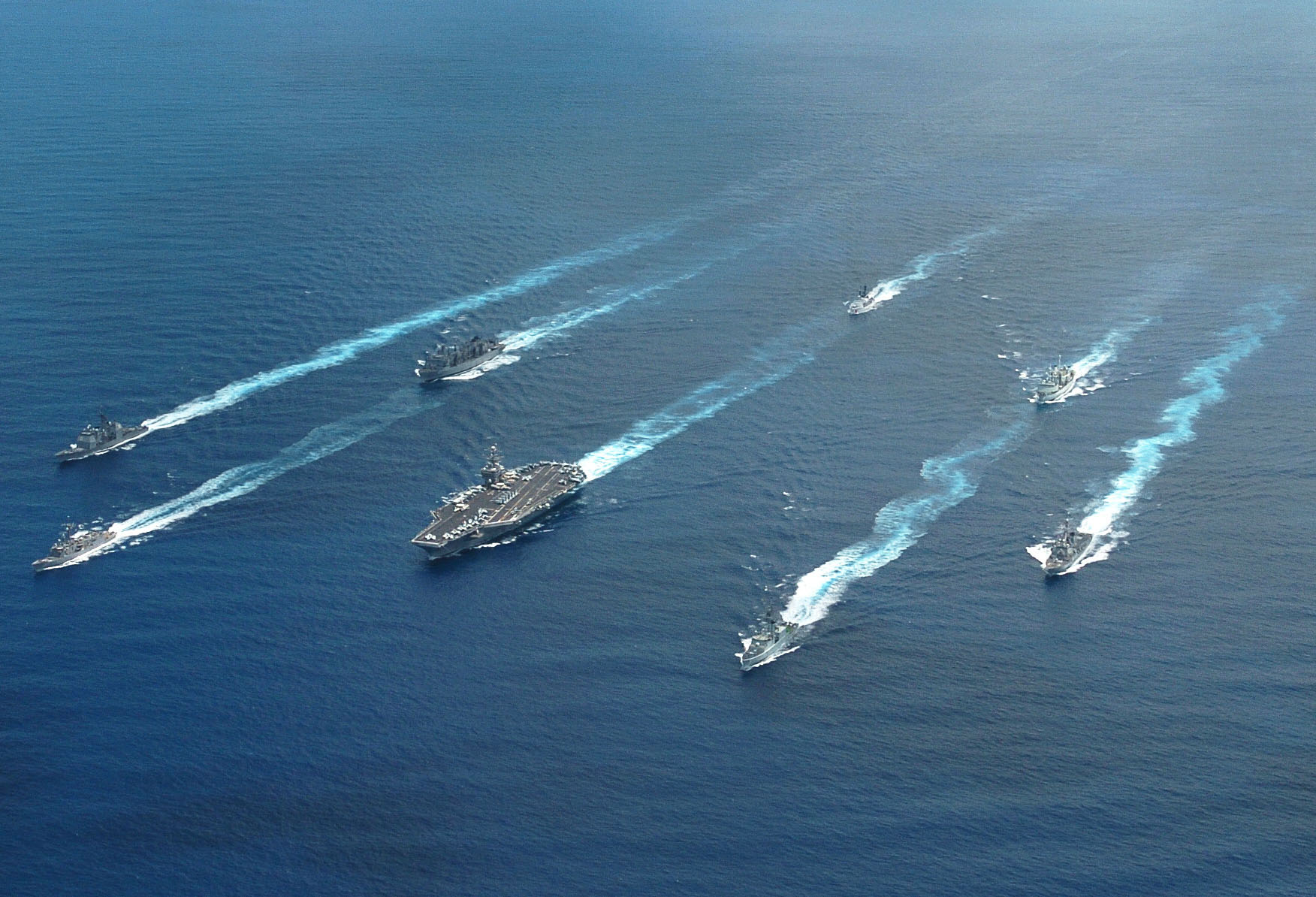
RIMPAC 2004 (25 June 2004)

The strike group's first major undertaking was Exercise Northern Edge 2004. Held from 7 June through 14 June 2004, Northern Edge 2004, focused on air-centric tactics and procedures with an emphasis on air-to-air, air-to-ground, and on personnel recovery operations in remote areas of the Pacific Alaska Range Complex (PARC) near Fairbanks, Alaska, and over water in the Gulf of Alaska. The carrier Stennis paid a port visit to Esquimalt, British Columbia between 18 and 21 June 2004, and the carrier strike group also participated bi-lateral exercises with the Canadian Navy between 22 and 29 June 2004.

==== RIMPAC 2004 ====
The Stennis CSG paid a port visit to Pearl Harbor between 22 and 26 June 2004, prior to RIMPAC 2004. The biennial Rim of the Pacific Exercise (Exercise RIMPAC) was two-weeks long, multinational, and involved 40 ships, seven submarines, 100 aircraft, and nearly 18,000 military personnel from seven nations. RIMPAC 2004 focused on multinational training while building trust and cooperation among the participating naval partners (pictured). The carrier John C Stennis was the flagship for the Multinational Task Force Commander, Rear Admiral Patrick Walsh, Commander Carrier Group 7.

=== U.S. Fifth Fleet: Persian Gulf and North Arabian Sea ===
On 30 January 2004, the George Washington carrier strike group departed Naval Station Norfolk, Virginia, for its 2004, deployment to the U.S. Fifth Fleet. On 16 February 2004, the George Washington carrier strike group completed a 16-hour transit of the Suez Canal and entered the U.S. Fifth Fleet area of responsibility.

==== Operation Vigilant Resolve ====
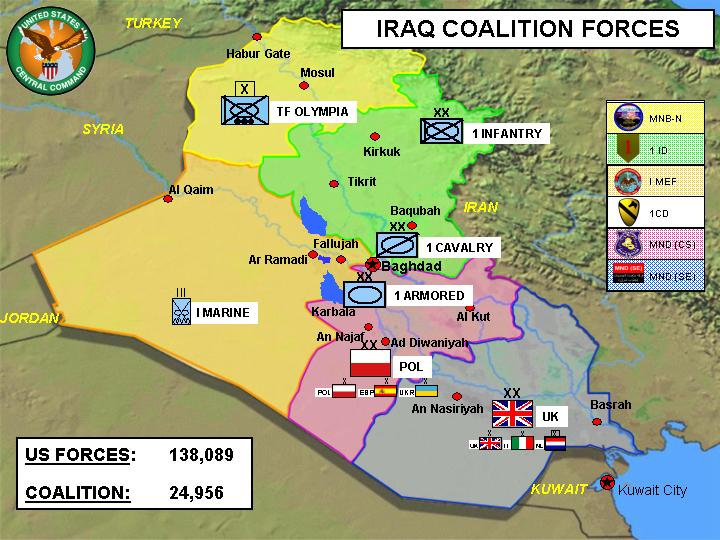
Coalition forces in Iraq (30 April 2004)

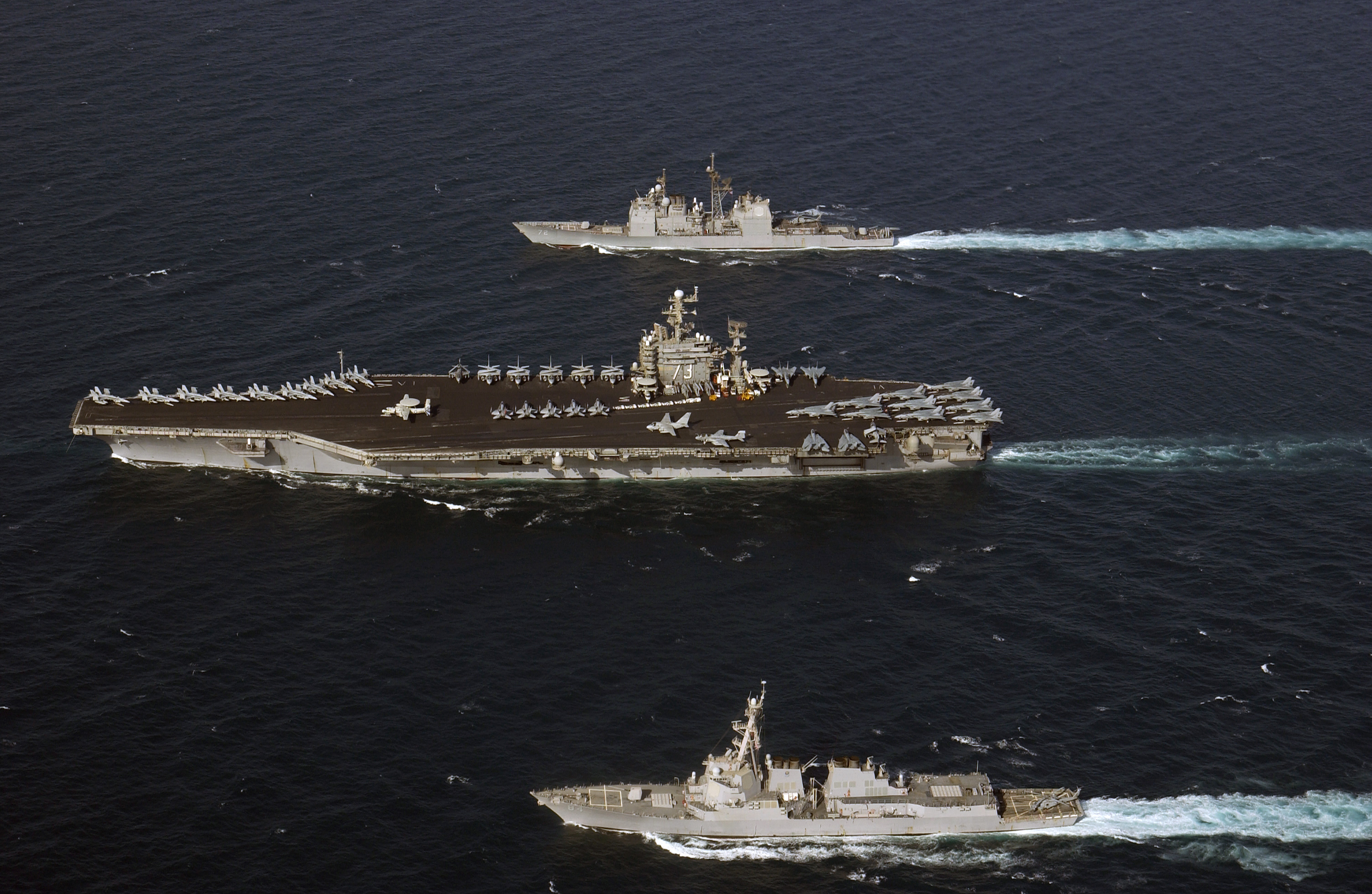
George Washington CSG (3 June 2004)

On 20 February 2004, the George Washington carrier group transited the Bab-el-Mandeb strait, leaving the Red Sea, and the strike group set course for the Arabian Sea. On 28 February 2004, the George Washington carrier strike group transited through the Strait of Hormuz and entered into the Persian Gulf. The carrier George Washington paid a port visit to Jebel Ali, UAE, between 14 and 19 March 2004.

On 9 April 2004, a second port visit to Jebel Ali was cancelled, and the George Washington carrier strike group was ordered to remain on station in the Persian Gulf after fighting intensified between Coalition Forces and insurgents around the city of Fallujah in the Iraqi province of Al Anbar. As part of Operation Vigilant Resolve, on 28 April 2004, Carrier Air Wing Seven squadrons VFA-136, VFA-131, VF-11, and VF-143 flew combat air sorties against insurgents in Fallujah. During this combat sortie, CVW-7 aircraft dropped 13 GBU-12 Paveway II laser-guided bombs on insurgent positions while continuing to provide combat air support to the 1st Marine Expeditionary Force.

On 25 April 2004, the George Washington carrier strike group steamed back to the Persian Gulf after terrorists attacked the Khor Al Amaya Oil Terminal (KAAOT) off the coast of Basra, Iraq. The strike group also provided search, rescue, and recovery support in the aftermath of the boarding incident involving the U.S. patrol ship Firebolt. The carrier George Washington subsequently paid a port visit to Jebel Ali between 7–11 May 2004.

Beginning 2 June 2004, the George Washington carrier strike group (pictured) began its participation in Summer Pulse 2004, which continued until the group's return to Norfolk on 26 July; the carrier George Washington was called the tip of the spear for the entire surge exercise.

==== Operation Iraqi Freedom ====
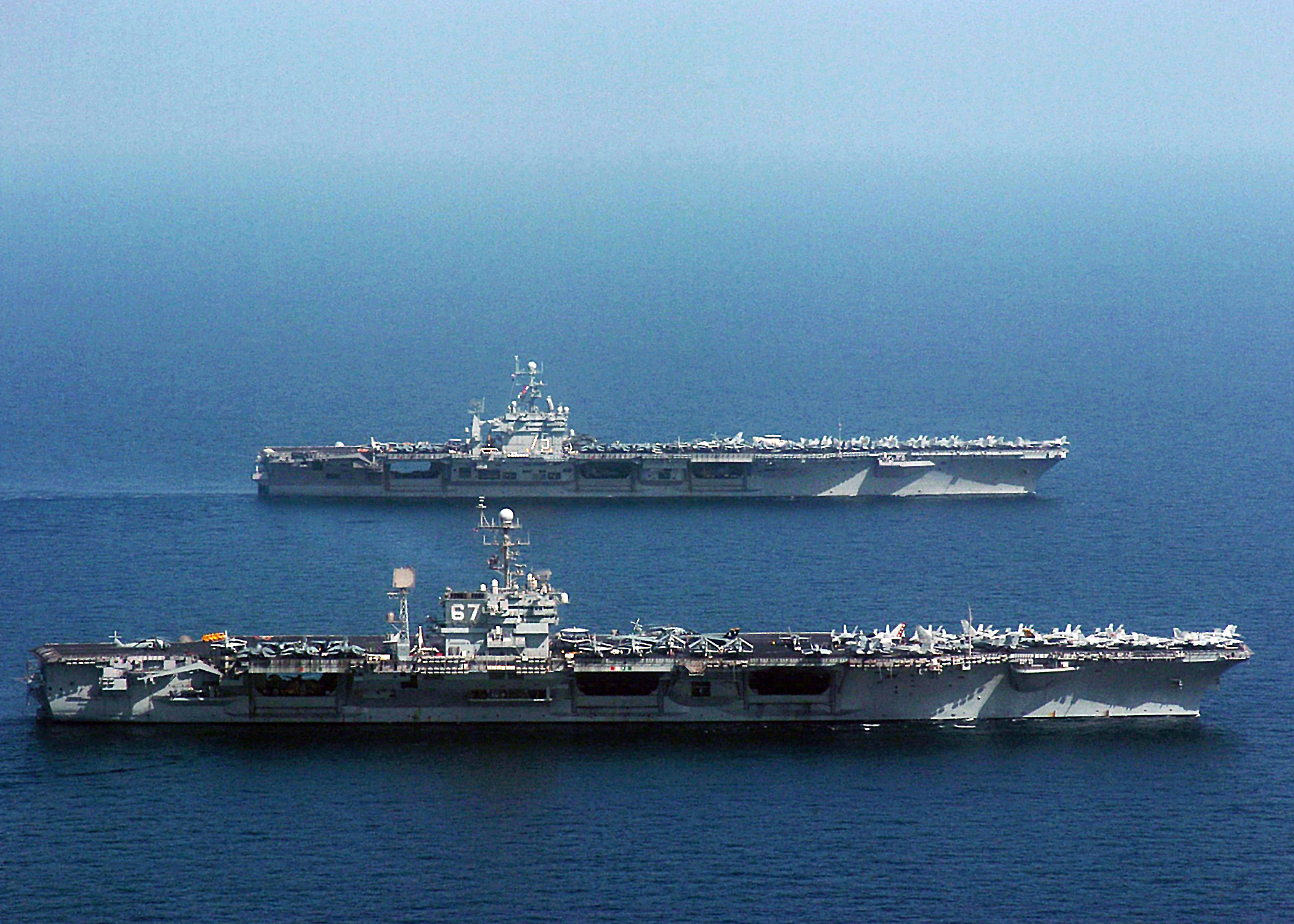
John F. Kennedy and Harry S. Truman (20 November 2004)

On 5 July 2004, the George Washington strike group departed the Persian Gulf. During its nearly five-month deployment to the Fifth Fleet, the George Washington carrier strike group spent 231 days away from home port and steamed 70,750 nautical miles. Carrier Air Wing Seven (CVW-7) amassed nearly 8,800 sorties, including 1,500 in direct support of Operation Iraqi Freedom, expended approximately 164,000 pounds (74,389 kg) of ordnance, and flew more than 21,000 flight hours. Destroyer Squadron 28 executed 200 Maritime Interdiction Operations (MIO) boardings and logged more than 12,000 surface contacts in the Persian Gulf.

On 10 July 2004, Carrier Air Wing Seventeen (CVW-17), flying from John F. Kennedy, launched air strikes supporting Multi-national Corps-Iraq and Iraqi forces. On 20 July, CVW-17 aircraft destroyed two anti-Iraqi positions in the strike group's first active engagement of anti-Iraqi targets, using GBU-12 and GBU-32 guided bombs on the enemy positions. On 20 November 2004, the Harry S. Truman carrier strike group relieved the John F. Kennedy carrier strike group (pictured).

During its 2004 deployment with the Fifth Fleet, the John F. Kennedy carrier strike group launched 8,296 sorties for a total of 21,824 flight hours, with 4,396 sorties and 11,607 of the flight hours in direct support of Operation Iraqi Freedom. During the course of operations in Iraq, 54,000 pounds (24,494 kg) of ordnance were dropped by the jets of CVW-17 squadrons. Carrier Air Wing 17 aircraft flew a combined total of 6,054 sorties in support of Operation Iraqi Freedom (OIF) and Operation Enduring Freedom – Afghanistan (OEF-A). During the height of operations, CVW-17 aircraft flew an average of 38 missions per day.

The John F. Kennedy carrier strike group returned from its deployment on 7 December 2004.

=== U.S. Sixth Fleet: Eastern Atlantic and Mediterranean Sea ===
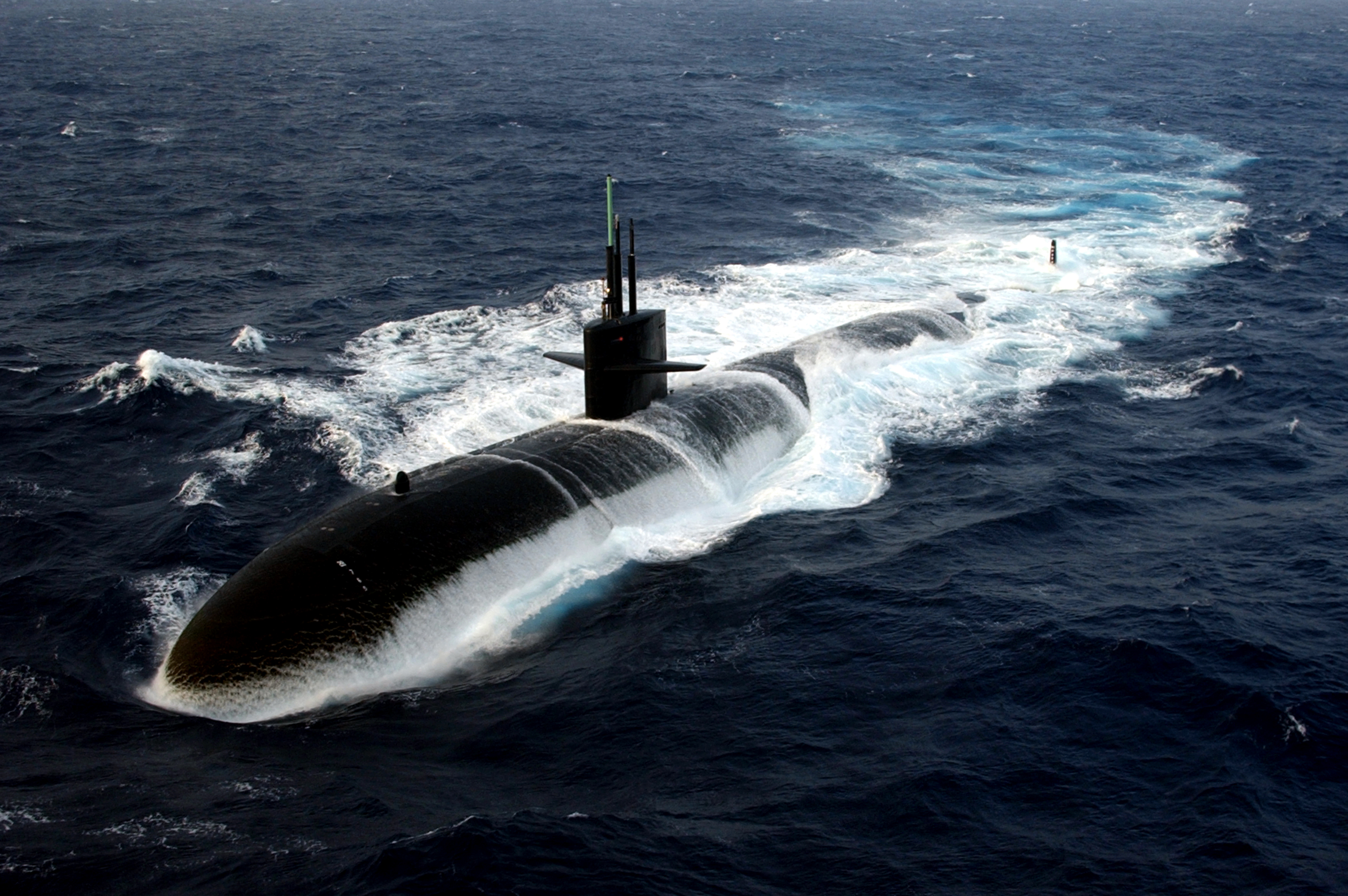
USS Albuquerque

On 2 June 2004, the Harry S. Truman carrier strike group, including the nuclear-powered submarine Albuquerque, departed Naval Station Norfolk, deploying to the Mediterranean Sea as part of Summer Pulse 2004. While still in the mid-Atlantic, the strike group came under command of the U.S. Sixth Fleet on 24 June 2004, and then paid a port visit to Naples between 2 and 6 July 2004.

On 3 June 2004, the Enterprise carrier strike group departed Norfolk for its trans-Atlantic phase of Summer Pulse 2004. The nuclear-powered submarine Miami deployed with the Enterprise carrier strike group for Summer Pulse 2004. During Summer Pulse 2004, the Enterprise carrier strike group participated in NATO exercises Neo Tapon and Joint Maritime Course 04-2 before joining the Harry S. Truman carrier strike group for Operation Medshark/Majestic Eagle 2004. Following Summer Pulse 2004, the Enterprise carrier strike group returned to Norfolk on 23 July 2004. The Harry S. Truman carrier strike group re-entered the U.S. Second Fleet's area of responsibility on 21 July 2004, and it returned to Norfolk on 25 July 2004.

==== Neo Tapon ====
Between 11 and 14 June 2004, the Enterprise carrier strike group participated in Neo Tapon, a Spanish-hosted NATO exercise, with the carrier Enterprise serving as the exercise's flagship. The Enterprise carrier strike group operated with British, Dutch, French, Italian, Moroccan, and Portuguese forces, as well as ships from Standing Naval Forces Atlantic and Standing Naval Forces Mediterranean, testing air and surface warfare and strike mission capabilities. The Neo Tapon exercise tested NATO surface warfare, air warfare, and strike mission capabilities, as well as the strike group's ability to implement plans quickly.

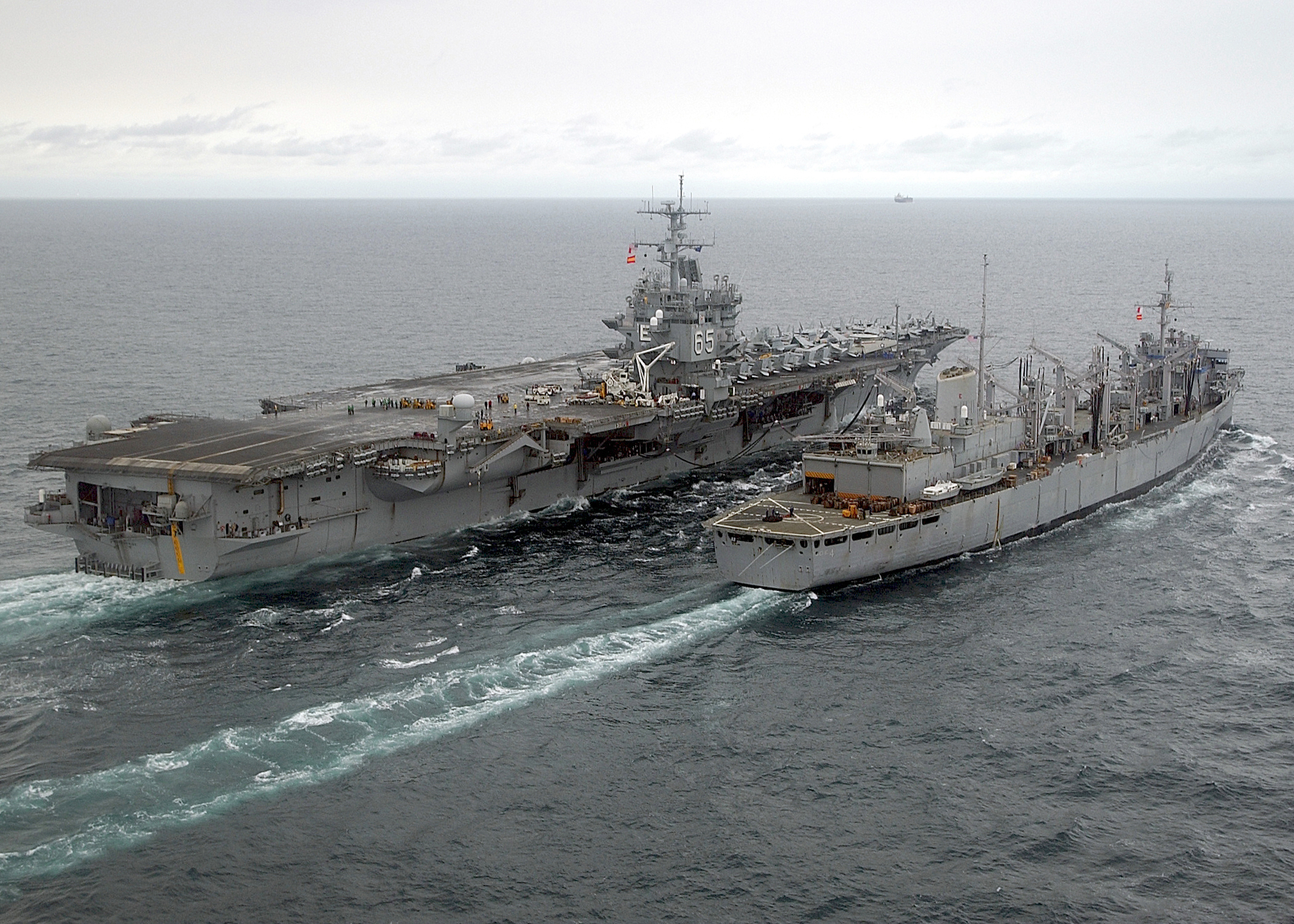
USS Enterprise and USS Detroit

==== Joint Maritime Course 04-2 ====
Steaming northward, the Enterprise carrier strike group participated in Joint Maritime Course 04-2 (JMC 04-2) exercises, a NATO operation hosted by the Joint Maritime Operations Training Staff, between 19 and 30 June 2004. More than 50 ships from Norway, Sweden, Germany, Belgium, the Netherlands, the United Kingdom, France, Spain, Germany, and the United States participated in the exercises while operating off the coast of Scotland.

The JMC involved two distinct phases, the first of which was the training exercise. During this phase, the guided-missile cruiser Gettysburg conducting gun-support operations and air defense coordination and Carrier Air Wing One conducting air operations with live ordnance on firing ranges. The second phase was the operational phase, with the 50 participating ships will split into two task groups. Enterprise served as one task group flagship, and the commander of the Belgian and the Netherlands task group command the other force. The fast logistics support ship Detroit provided logistic support, and it also acted as a high-value asset during the exercise. The carrier Enterprise made its first port visit at Portsmouth between 2 and 6 July 2004.

==== Operation Medshark/Majestic Eagle 2004 ====
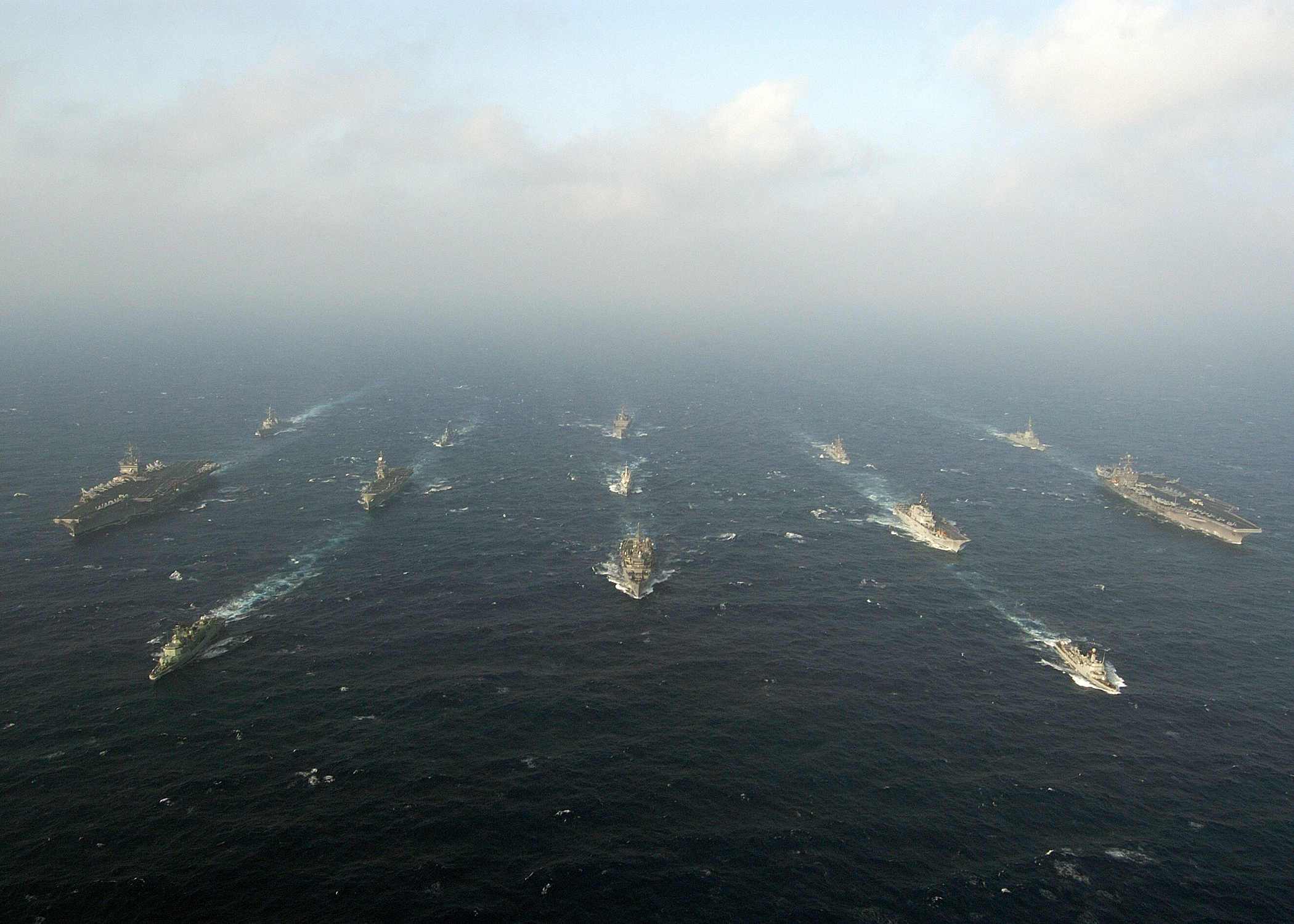
Medshark/Majestic Eagle 2004

On 11 July 2004, the Enterprise and Harry S. Truman carrier strike groups participated in NATO Operation Medshark/Majestic Eagle 2004 (MS/ME04), held between 11 and 16 July 2004, in the eastern Atlantic Ocean off Morocco. The exercise included ships and aircraft from the United States, United Kingdom, France, Spain, The Netherlands, Turkey, Italy, Germany, Portugal, and Morocco under the overall command of Vice Admiral Henry G. Ulrich III, USN, Commander, Naval Striking and Support Forces NATO.

Hosted by Morocco, recently designated as a Major non-NATO ally by U.S. President George W. Bush, the objective of Operation Medshark/Majestic Eagle was to develop interoperability and build military relationships between the participating ten allied nations. The exercise was the first to use the Cap Draa training area off southwest Morocco to conduct live fire training exercises. The first phase involved sea-control war games between the two carrier strike groups, and the second phase simulated choke-point transit through a strait. Operation Medshark/Majestic Eagle involved more than 20,000 personnel, almost 150 aircraft, and 30 ships from 10 nations led by the carriers Enterprise, Principe De Asturias, Truman, and Giuseppe Garibaldi. The nuclear-powered submarines Albuquerque (pictured), Miami, and Albany also participated in Operation MEDSHARK/Majestic Eagle. To provide support for those submarines, the submarine tender Emory S. Land sailed west from Italy. She berthed at Rota, Spain, spent eight exercise days underway, and then briefly revisited Rota before heading back for Italy.

=== U.S. Seventh Fleet: Western Pacific ===
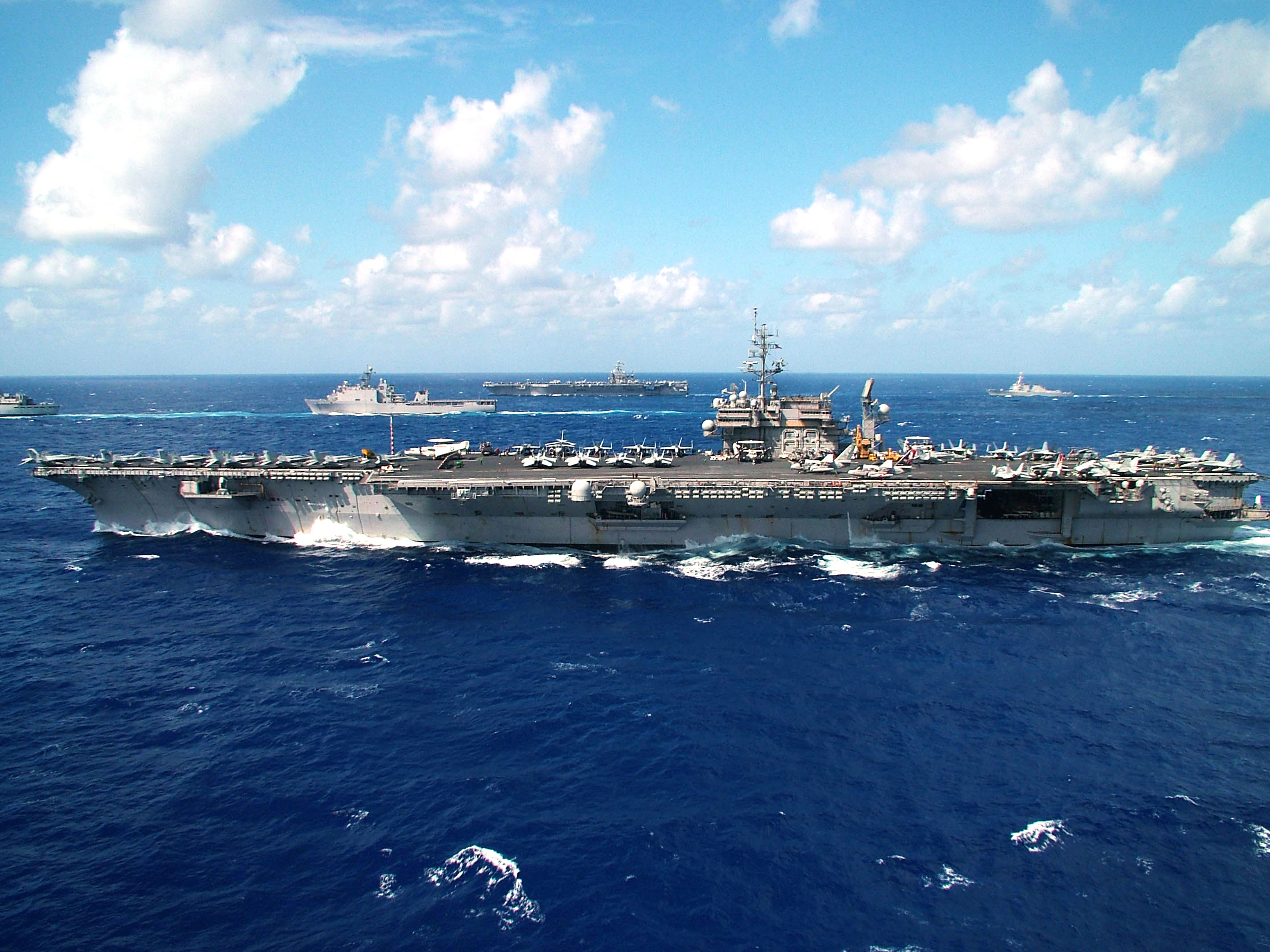
JASEX 2004

On 19 July 2004, Carrier Group Five, with its staff aboard Kitty Hawk, departed from Yokosuka, Japan, to participate in Summer Pulse 2004. While underway, Carrier Air Wing Five executed carrier landing qualifications (CQ) for its naval aviators.

The Stennis and Kitty Hawk groups subsequently operated together in Joint Air and Sea Exercise 2004 (JASEX 04) (pictured). The combat stores ships Concord supported both carrier strike groups, delivering 2,576 cargo pallets during the months of July and August. This second annual joint exercise involved air and sea training events focused on integrating joint training. JASEX 04 also included training to improve interoperability and teamwork between the two carrier strike groups, as well as with land-based Air Force and Marine Corps units forward deployed to in the Western Pacific. Typhoon Rananim complicated the exercise, causing the two carrier strike groups to re-deploy 600 nautical miles (1,100 km) east to the Iwo Jima operating area. JASEX 04 ended on 15 August 2004.

The Stennis carrier strike group returned to San Diego on 1 November 2004. The Kitty Hawk carrier strike group completed its Tailored Ship's Training Availability (TSTA) Phase III training exercises and returned to Yokosuka on 7 September 2004, concluding its participation in Summer Pulse 2004.

== Combat operations and exercises ==
No.	Operation/Exercise	Dates	Carrier Strike Group(s)	Command Authority/Participant(s)	Operating Area	Notes
1st:	Operation Iraqi Freedom/Operation Vigilant Resolve	(Note: USS George Washington from 28 February to 5 July 2004; USS John F. Kennedy from 5 July to 20 November 2004.)	George Washington, John F. Kennedy	U.S. Fifth Fleet	Persian Gulf/Arabian Sea	
2nd:	Operation Enduring Freedom – Afghanistan	(Note: USS George Washington from 28 February to 5 July 2004; USS John F. Kennedy from 5 July to 20 November 2004.)	George Washington, John F. Kennedy	U.S. Fifth Fleet	Persian Gulf/Arabian Sea	
3rd:	Northern Edge	7-14 Jun.	John C. Stennis	U.S. Alaskan Command	Gulf of Alaska	
4th:	Neo Tapon	11-14 Jun.	Enterprise	NATO (Note: The United Kingdom, the Netherlands, France, Italy, Morocco, and Portugal participated in Neo Tapon, with Spain serving as the exercise's host.)	Eastern Atlantic	
5th:	Combined Joint Task Force Exercise 04-2 (Note: Codenamed Operation Blinding Storm for the U.S. Navy, and Operation Rapid Alliance for the Royal Navy.)	12-19 Jun.	John F. Kennedy	U.S. Joint Forces Command (Note: CJTFEX 04-2 included coalition forces from the United Kingdom, France, Italy, Denmark, Peru, the Netherlands, Canada, Germany, and Norway.)	Western Atlantic	
6th:	Gringo-Gaucho	17 Jun.	Ronald Reagan	Argentine Navy	South Atlantic	
7th:	Joint Maritime Course 04-2 (JMC 04-2)	19–30 Jun.	Enterprise	NATO (Note: JMC 04-2 included forces from Norway, Sweden, Germany, Belgium, the Netherlands, the United Kingdom, France, Spain, and Germany. with Joint Maritime Operations Training Staff supervising the exercise.)	Western Approaches	
8th:	Group Sail/PASSEX	22–29 June	John C. Stennis	Maritime Forces Pacific	North Pacific	
9th:	Force projection	28 Jun. – 1 Jul.	Kitty Hawk	U.S. Seventh Fleet	Sea of Japan	
10th:	Exercise UNITAS 45-04 Amphibious Phase	4 Jul.	Ronald Reagan	U.S. Southern Command (Note: UNITAS 45-04 included Argentina, Bolivia, Chile, Ecuador, Dominican Republic, Paraguay, Peru, and Uruguay.)	Eastern Pacific	
11th:	Exercise RIMPAC 2004	6-22 Jul.	John C. Stennis	U.S. Pacific Command	Mid-Pacific	
12th:	Silent Force Exercise	9 Jul.	Ronald Reagan	Peruvian Navy	South Pacific	
13th:	Medshark/Majestic Eagle	11-16 Jul.	Enterprise, Harry S. Truman	STRIKFORNATO (Note: The United Kingdom, the Netherlands, France, Italy, and Portugal participated with Morocco acting as the exercise's host nation.)	Eastern Atlantic	
14th:	Carrier qualifications	26-29 Jul.	Kitty Hawk	U.S. Seventh Fleet	Western Pacific	
15th:	JASEX	8-14 Aug.	Kitty Hawk, John C. Stennis	U.S. Pacific Command	Western Pacific	

== Force composition ==
=== Carrier battle groups ===
Carrier battle group	Immediate Senior in Command (ISIC)	Carrier air wing	Underway period	Theater of operation	Notes
Kitty Hawk	Rear Admiral James D. Kelly, Commander Carrier Group Five (Note: Rear Adm. William J. McCarthy relieved Rear Adm. James D. Kelly on 5 July 2004. USS George Washington (CVN-73) Command History 2004, Encl. (1), p. 1.)	CVW-5	19 Jul. to 7 Sep.	U.S. Seventh Fleet	
Enterprise	Rear Admiral Bernard J. McCullough III, Commander Cruiser-Destroyer Group Twelve	CVW-1	3 Jun. to 23 Jul.	U.S. Sixth Fleet	
John F. Kennedy	Rear Admiral Donald K. Bullard, Commander Carrier Group Six	CVW-17	7 Jun. to 23 Dec.	U.S. Second/Fifth Fleets	
George Washington	Rear Admiral H. Denby Starling II, Commander Carrier Group Eight	CVW-7	20 Jan. to 26 Jul.	U.S. Fifth Fleet	
John C. Stennis	Rear Admiral Patrick M. Walsh, Commander Carrier Group Seven	CVW-14	24 May to 1 Nov.	U.S. Third/Seventh Fleets	
Harry S. Truman	Rear Admiral Michael C. Tracy, Commander Cruiser-Destroyer Group Two	CVW-3	1 Jun. to 25 Jul.	U.S. Sixth Fleet	
Ronald Reagan	Rear Admiral Robert T. Moeller, Commander Cruiser-Destroyer Group One	CVW-11	27 May to 23 Jul.	U.S. Second Fleet	

=== Carrier air wings ===
CVW-1	CVW-3	CVW-5	CVW-7	CVW-11	CVW-14	CVW-17
Enterprise CSG	Harry S. Truman CSG	Kitty Hawk CSG	George Washington CSG	Ronald Reagan CSG	John C. Stennis CSG	John F. Kennedy CSG
VFA-86: F/A-18C	VMFA-115: F/A-18A+	VFA-195: F/A-18C(N)	VF-143: F-14B	VFA-41: F/A-18F	VFA-115: 14 F/A-18E	VF-103: F-14B
VFA-82: F/A-18C(N)	VFA-105: F/A-18C(N)	VFA-192: F/A-18C(N)	VFA-136: F/A-18C(N)	VFA-14: F/A-18E	VFA-113: F/A-18C	VFA-83: F/A-18C(N)
VAQ-137: EA-6B	VFA-37: FA-18C(N)	VFA-102: F/A-18F	VFA-131: F/A-18C(N)	VAW-117: E-2C	VF-31: F-14D	VFA-81: F/A-18C
VAW-123: E-2C	VF-32: F-14B	VAQ-136: EA-6B	VF-11: F-14B	HS-6: SH-60F	VFA-25: F/A-18C	VFA-34: F/A-18C(N)
VS-32: S-3B	VAQ-130: E-2C	VAW-115: E-2C	VAQ-140: EA-6B	VRC-30: C-2A	VAQ-139: 4 EA-6B	VAQ-132: EA-6B
HS-11: SH-60F/HH-60H	VAW-126: E-2C	VS-21: S-3B	VAW-121: E-2C	—	VAW-113: E-2C	VAW-125: E-2C
VRC-40, Det. 2: C-2A	VS-22: S-3B	HS-14: SH-60F/HH-60H	VS-31: S-3B	—	VS-35: S-3B	VS-30: S-3B
—	HS-7: HH-60H/SH-60F	HS-7: HH-60H/SH-60F	HS-5: HH-60H/SH-60F	—	HS-4: HH-60H/SH-60F	HS-15: SH-60F/HH-60H
—	VRC-40, Det. 5: C-2A	VRC-30, Det. 5: C-2A	VRC-40, Det. 3: C-2A	—	VRC-30, Det. 1: C-2A	VRC-40, Det. 4: C-2A

=== Surface warships, submarines, and fleet auxiliaries ===
Cruisers:

- USS Vella Gulf (CG-72)
- USS Vicksburg (CG-69)
- USS Gettysburg (CG-64)
- USS Chancellorsville (CG-62)
- USS Monterey (CG-61)
- USS Lake Champlain (CG-57)
- USS Thomas S. Gates (CG-51)
- USS Vincennes (CG-49)

Command ships:

- USS La Salle (AGF-3)

Destroyers:

- USS Mustin (DDG-89)
- USS Mason (DDG-87)
- USS Bulkeley (DDG-84)
- USS Howard (DDG-83)
- USS Roosevelt (DDG-80)
- USS Benfold (DDG-65)
- USS Ramage (DDG-61)
- USS John S. McCain (DDG-56)
- USS Curtis Wilbur (DDG-54)
- USS Barry (DDG-52)
- USS Spruance (DD-963)

Frigates:

- USS Ford (FFG-54)
- USS Gary (FFG-51)
- HMCS Toronto (FFH 333)

Nuclear-powered submarines:

- USS Toledo (SSN-769)
- USS Charlotte (SSN-766)
- USS Miami (SSN-755)
- USS Albany (SSN-753)
- USS Salt Lake City (SSN-716)
- USS Albuquerque (SSN-706)

Amphibious warfare ships:

- USS Tortuga (LSD-46)

Fast combat support ships:

- USNS Rainier (T-AOE-7)
- USNS Supply (T-AOE-6)
- USS Detroit (AOE-4)
- USS Seattle (AOE-3)

Combat stores ships:

- USNS Concord (T-AFS-5)

Submarine tenders:

- USS Emory S. Land (AS-39)

== Aftermath ==
Regarding the success of Summer Sure 2004, Rear Admiral James D. Kelly, Commander Carrier Group Five (COMCARGRU-5), noted:

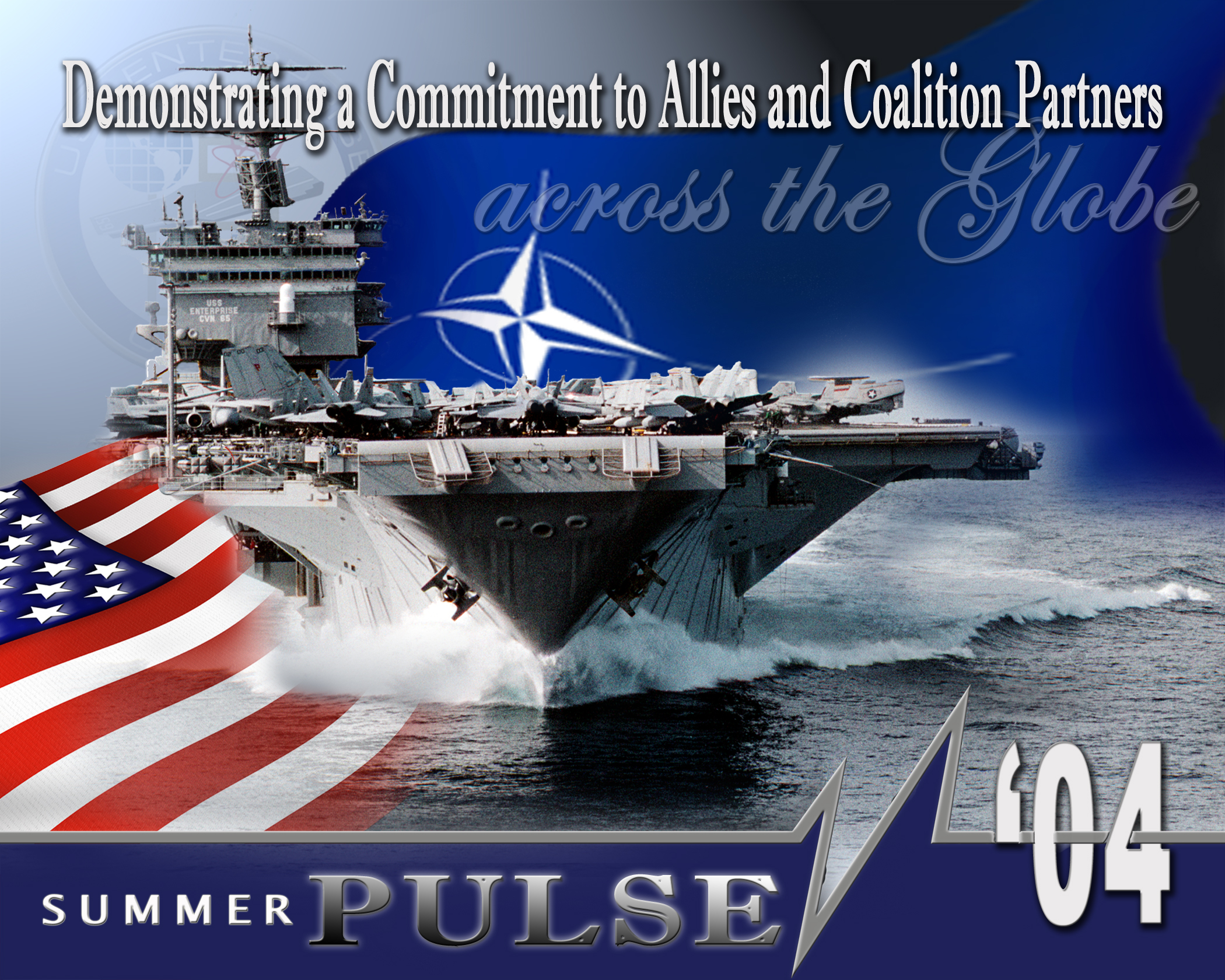
Summer Pulse 2004 graphic – USS Enterprise

Summer Pulse '04 and the [FRP] are not about how often and how long we can deploy. They are about being able to answer the nation’s call in force – six CSGs in 30 days and two more within three months – by providing credible combat power where and when it is needed. Summer Pulse '04 is the proof of our readiness.

Summer Pulse 2004 drew criticism from Chalmers Johnson who stated that the U.S. Navy's multi-carrier surge deployment looked "like the peacetime equivalent of the Normandy landings and may well end in a disaster" in his editorial essay published in the Los Angeles Times on 15 July 2004. He also characterized Summer Pulse 2004 as a "modern rerun of 19th century gunboat diplomacy" directed at the People's Republic of China and timed for the upcoming 2004 U.S. presidential election that "sounds like a last hurrah of the neocons." Johnson also asserted that all seven U.S. Navy carrier strike groups were being deployed to the Chinese coast near Taiwan, prompting the Los Angeles Times to issue the following correction on 4 August 2004:

A commentary by Chalmers Johnson on 15 July on a U.S. naval exercise and China's potential reaction incorrectly stated that seven carrier groups in "Summer Pulse 2004" would be off the Chinese coast near Taiwan. The Navy says the carrier groups will be deployed globally, with only one in the western Pacific.

Although there was some congressional criticism, the Fleet Response Plan remains the operational cornerstone for United States Navy in the early 21st century, with Summer Pulse 2004 being its first operational test.

In Fiscal Year 2015, The United States Navy introduced a new Optimized Fleet Response Plan (O-FRP) with the USS Harry S. Truman (CVN-75) being the first aircraft to use this new plan. The Optimized Fleet Response Plan is designed to align carrier strike groups to a new 36-month training and deployment cycle. All required maintenance, training, evaluations, plus a single eight-month overseas deployment will be scheduled throughout this 36-month cycle in order to reduce costs while increasing overall fleet readiness. Also, this new plan will streamline the inspection and evaluation process while maintaining a surge capacity for emergency deployments. The ultimate objective is to reduce time at sea while increasing in-port time from 49% to 68%. While initially to be used by U.S. Navy carrier strike groups, the Optimized Fleet Response Plan will be adopted for all fleet operations.

== See also ==
- Great White Fleet
- Operation Sea Orbit

== Notes ==
Footnotes

Citations
