= Battleaxe (disambiguation) =

A battle axe is a weapon.

Battleaxe, battle axe, or battle ax may also refer to:

== Axes ==
- Labrys, a double-edged axe
- Francisca, a throwing axe used as a weapon

== Military ==
- Operation Battleaxe, a British World War II operation in North Africa, 1941
- No. 7 Squadron IAF, nicknamed "Battle Axes"
- The 78th Infantry Division (United Kingdom), also known as the Battleaxe Division
- 74 Battery (The Battle Axe Company) Royal Artillery
- The 65th Infantry Division (United States), nicknamed "Battle-Axe"
- Carrier Air Wing Three, an aircraft carrier air wing of the United States Navy, nicknamed "Battle Axe"

== Ships ==
- Several ships in the Royal Navy have been called HMS Battleaxe:
  - HMS Battleaxe (D118), a Weapon-class destroyer
  - HMS Battleaxe (F89), a Type 22 frigate
  - HMS Empire Battleaxe, a landing-ship
- ST Battleaxe, a tugboat

== Arts and culture ==
- Battleaxe (band), a heavy metal music band from the 1980s
- An instrumental piece composed by Carlos Cavazo on Quiet Riot's breakthrough album Metal Health
- "Battle-axe", a song by Deftones, from their 2003 album Deftones
- Battleaxe (novel) a 1995 novel by Sara Douglass
- Battleaxe (comics), Marvel comics character
- Battle Axe (album), a 2018 album by Sharon Needles, or the title song
- The Battleaxe, a 1962 British comedy film
- Battle Axe Records, a record label founded in 1996
  - Battle Axe Warriors, the first in a series of three compilation albums released by Battle Axe Records from 2000 to 2003

== Other ==
- Battle-axe (woman), an aggressive, domineering and forceful woman
- Battle Ax, a shield volcano in the Cascade Range of Oregon
- Corded Ware culture, sometimes known as "Battle Axe culture"
- The Varangians, sometimes known as "Battle-axe Guards"
- The "Battle Axes", a free-love perfectionist Christian sect founded by Theophilus Gates

== See also ==
- Warhammer (disambiguation)
