= Line of communication =

Route that connects an operating military unit with its supply base

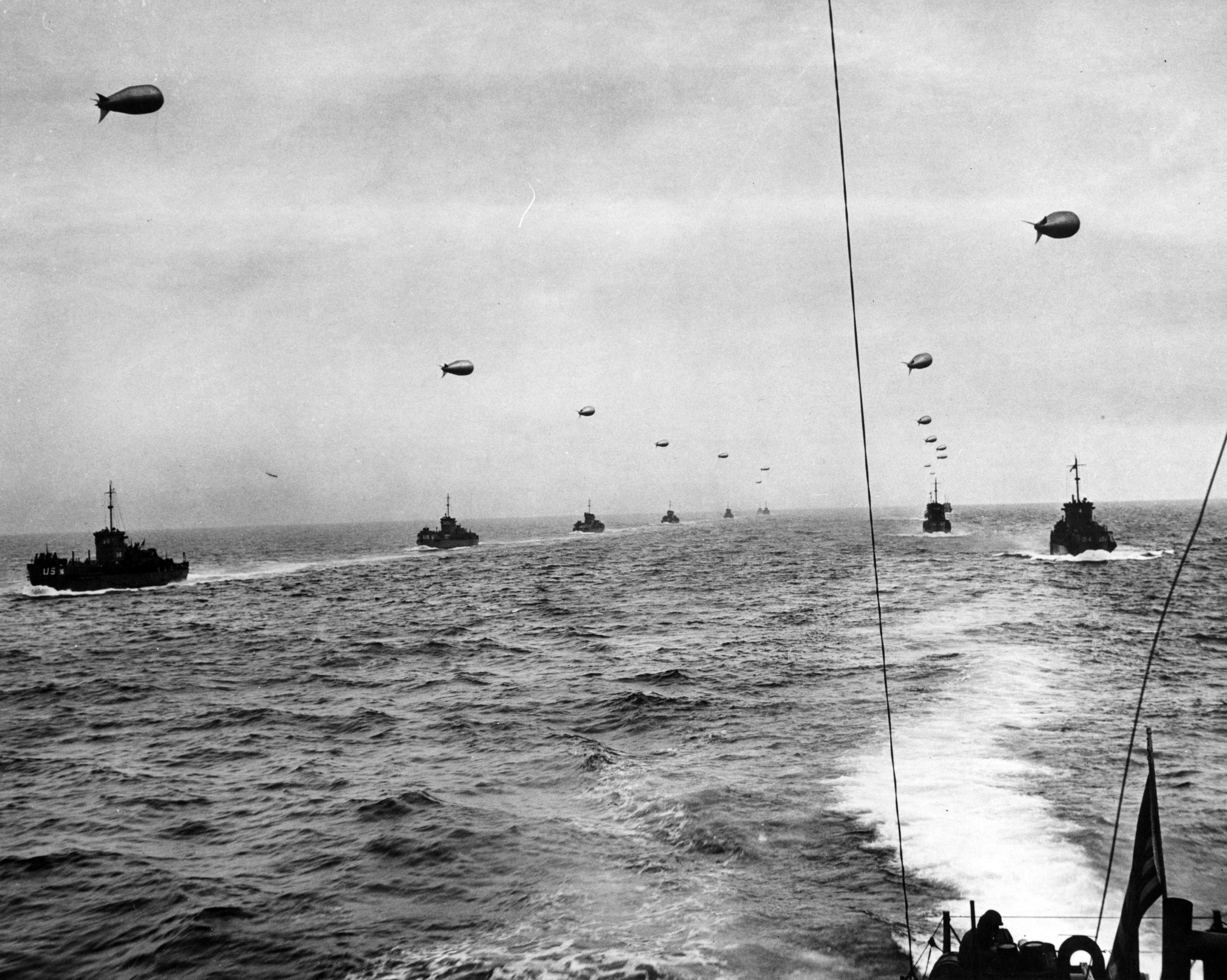
Convoy of ships supporting Allied forces in the invasion of Normandy in June 1944 during the Second World War.

A line of communication (or communications) is the route that connects an operating military unit with its supply base.

Supplies and reinforcements are transported along the line of communication. Therefore, a secure and open line of communication is vital for any military force to continue to operate effectively. Prior to the advent of the use of the telegraph and radio in warfare, lines of communication were also the routes used by dispatch riders on horseback and runners to convey and deliver orders and battle updates to and from unit commanders and headquarters. Thus, a unit whose lines of communication were compromised was vulnerable to becoming isolated and destroyed, as the means for requesting reinforcements and resupply is lost. The standard military abbreviation is LOC. There is also SLOC for Sea Line of Communication, GLOC for Ground Line of Communication, or ALOC for Air Line of Communication.

The interdiction of supplies and reinforcements to units closer to the front lines is therefore an important strategic goal for opposing forces. Some notable examples:

- The siege of Vicksburg in the American Civil War, in which Ulysses S. Grant encircled the city, leading to its eventual surrender in July 1863
- The Battle of France in World War II, in which the Germans cut off the French and British armies in Belgium (although the Dunkirk evacuation rescued over 330,000 of them)
- The encirclement of German 6th Army in the Battle of Stalingrad in World War II
- The United States' attacks on the Ho Chi Minh trail during the Vietnam War

== See also ==
=== Logistics in general ===
- Aerial refueling
- Airlift
- Army engineering maintenance
- Expeditionary maneuver warfare
- Integrated logistics support
- Logistician
- Logistics Officer
- Main supply route
- Military logistics
- Military supply chain management
- NATO Stock Number
- Performance-based logistics
- Seabasing
- Sealift
- Train (military)
- Underway replenishment

=== Specific logistics operations ===
- Battle of Pusan Perimeter logistics
- British logistics in the Falklands War
- British logistics in the Second Boer War
