= F140 =

F140 or variation, may refer to:

- Ferrari Enzo Ferrari (model F140) supercar
  - Ferrari F140 engine (automobile engine), engine used in the Ferrari Enzo supercar and other cars
- TRAXX F140 (train engine), see TRAXX
- INS Talwar (F140), Indian Navy frigate warship
- HMS Eastway (F140), British Royal Navy frigate warship, see HMS Battleaxe
- Farman F.140 Super Goliath, 4-engine biplane bomber warplane
