= Warhammer Fantasy =

Warhammer Fantasy can mean:

- Warhammer Fantasy (setting), the fictional setting of the various games and media
- Warhammer (game), a table-top fantasy miniature wargame, and origin of the franchise
- Warhammer Age of Sigmar, the successor game from 2015
- Warhammer Fantasy Roleplay, a fantasy role-playing game

== See also ==
- Warhammer (disambiguation)
