= EMW =

EMW may stand for:

- EMW Corporation, a Korea's electronics company, by KOSDAQ number in 079190.
- Eisenacher Motorenwerk, a former East German manufacturer of automobiles and motorcycles and one-time Formula One participant
- Elektro Mechanische Werke, a former German aircraft manufacturer
- Electromagnetic wave, a phenomenon that takes the form of self-propagating waves in a vacuum or in matter.
- Evangelical Movement of Wales, a Christian organisation in Wales
- Expeditionary maneuver warfare, a warfare concept of the United States Marine Corps
- Evangelisches Missionswerk in Deutschland, an institute of the Evangelical Church in Germany
- Enzyklopädie der Mathematischen Wissenschaften, known as Klein's encyclopedia
