= Operation Hammer =

Operation Hammer may refer to:

- Operation Hammer (1969), Australian military operation during the Vietnam War fought around the village of Binh Ba, 6–8 June 1969
- Operation Hammer (1987), a Los Angeles Police Department CRASH initiative that began in April 1987
- Operation Hammer (1997), a Turkish Armed Forces operation in northern Iraq against the Kurdistan Workers Party
- Operation Hammer (Afghanistan), a 2007 Coalition operation during the War in Afghanistan (2001–2021)

== See also ==
- Hammer and anvil, military tactic
- Operation Midnight Hammer, 2025 United States strikes on Iranian nuclear facilities
- Operation Sledgehammer, proposed 1942 World War II military operation, never carried out
- Operation Tiger Hammer, 2003 US-Iraq War military operation
- Operation Viking Hammer, 2003 US-Iraq War military operation
- Operation Sledgehammer Hit, 2007 NATO-Afghanistan War military operation
- Operation Hammer Down, 2011 NATO-Afghanistan War military operation
- Gulf War: Operation Desert Hammer, 1999 videogame
- Operation Iron Hammer (disambiguation)
- Hammer (disambiguation)
- Operation (disambiguation)
- Warhammer (disambiguation)
