= Operation Iron Hammer =

Operation Iron Hammer may refer to:

- Operation Eisenhammer (Iron Hammer), a planned military operation in World War II
- Operation Iron Hammer (Iraq 2003), a military operation of the multinational force during the Iraq War
- Operation Iron Hammer (Iraq 2005), a joint U.S.–Iraqi military operation during the subsequent insurgency

== See also ==
- Operation Hammer (disambiguation)
