= VAQ-130 =

Electronic Attack Squadron 130
- Active: 1 September 1959 - Present (67 years)
- Country: United States
- Branch: United States Navy
- Type: Electronic Attack
- Role: Electronic Warfare
- Part of: Carrier Air Wing Three
- Garrison/HQ: NAS Whidbey Island
- Nickname: Zappers
- Mottos: "Zap Zap, Dominate", "Fly Fast, Talk Trash, E.A."
- Colors: #0f5842 #42b468 #f2e908
- Mascot: Robbie the Dragon
- Engagements: Vietnam War; Operation Desert Shield; Operation Desert Storm; Operation Provide Promise; Operation Southern Watch; Operation Deny Flight; Operation Deliberate Force; Operation Deliberate Guard; Operation Desert Fox; Operation Iraqi Freedom; Operation Majestic Eagle; Operation Enduring Freedom; Operation New Dawn; Operation Inherent Resolve Operation Prosperity Guardian; 2024 missile strikes in Yemen; Operation Absolute Resolve
- Decorations: Safety "S" (4); Battle "E" (3); Admiral Arthur W. Radford Award (2); Prowler Squadron of the Year Award (3); Association of Old Crows- Outstanding Unit Award
- Website: https://www.airpac.navy.mil/Organization/Electronic-Attack-Squadron-VAQ-130/

Commanders
- Commanding Officer: CDR. Timothy "Puddy" Warburton
- Executive Officer: CDR.
- Command Master Chief: CMDCM. Frank H. Wilson Jr.

Insignia
- Callsign: ZAPPER
- Modex: 5XX
- Tail Code: AC

Aircraft flown
- Electronic warfare: EA-1E/F Skyraider (1959-1968); EKA-3B Skywarrior (1968-1975; EA-6B Prowler(1975-2011); EA-18G Growler(2011-Present)

Electronic Attack Squadron 130 (VAQ-130), also known as the "Zappers", is an EA-18G Growler squadron of the United States Navy based aboard Naval Air Station Whidbey Island. Part of Carrier Air Wing 3, the Zappers deploy aboard the aircraft carrier USS Dwight D. Eisenhower. VAQ-130 is the oldest electronic warfare squadron in the U.S. Navy.

== Squadron history ==
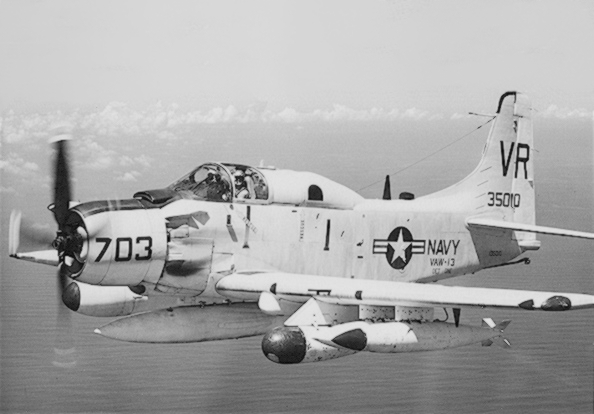
VAW-13 EA-1F in 1966

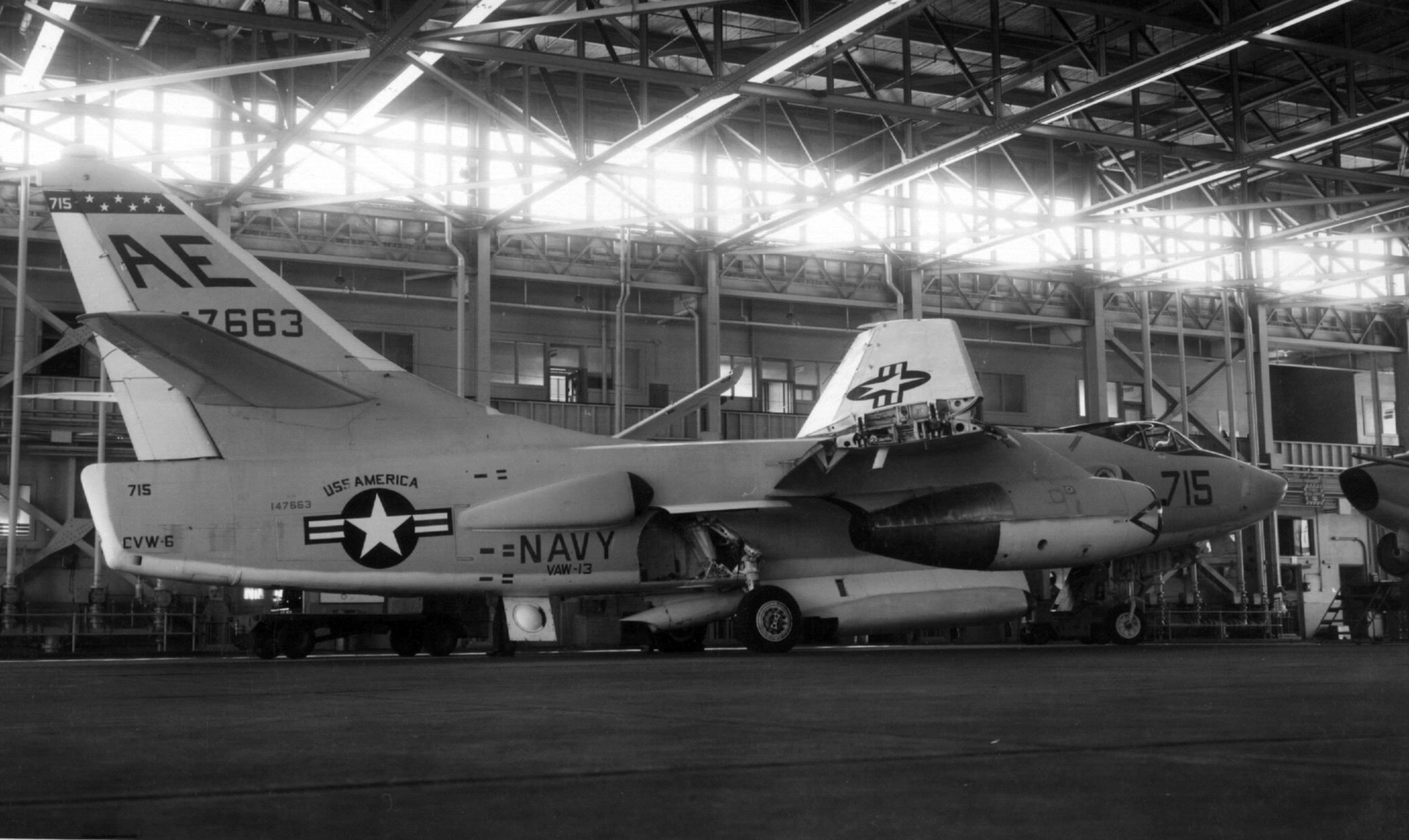
VAW-13 EKA-3B at NAS Alameda in 1968

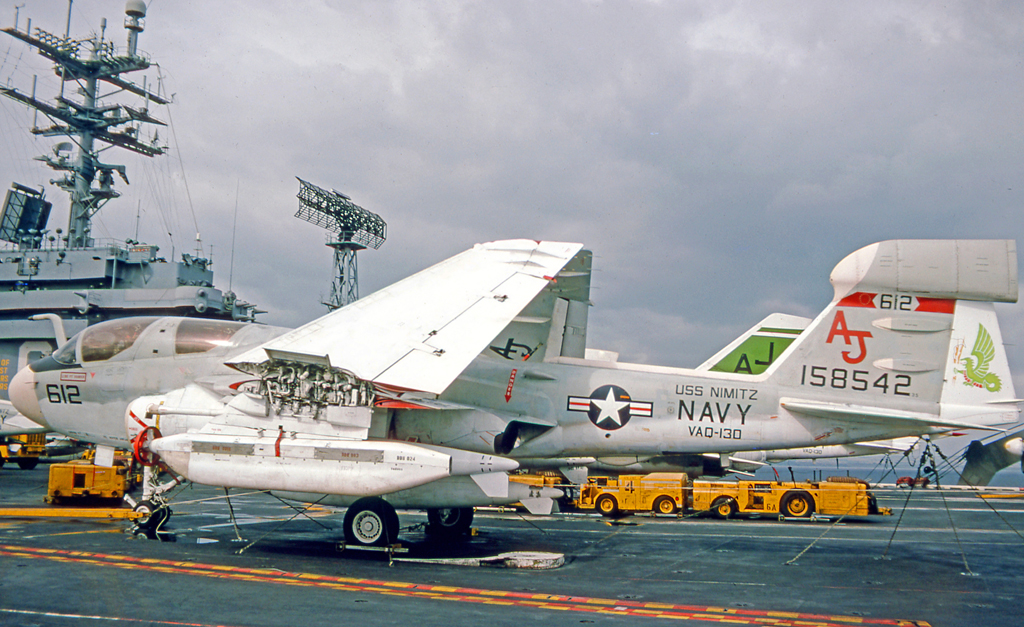
VAQ-130 Grumman EA-6B Prowler aboard USS Nimitz in 1975

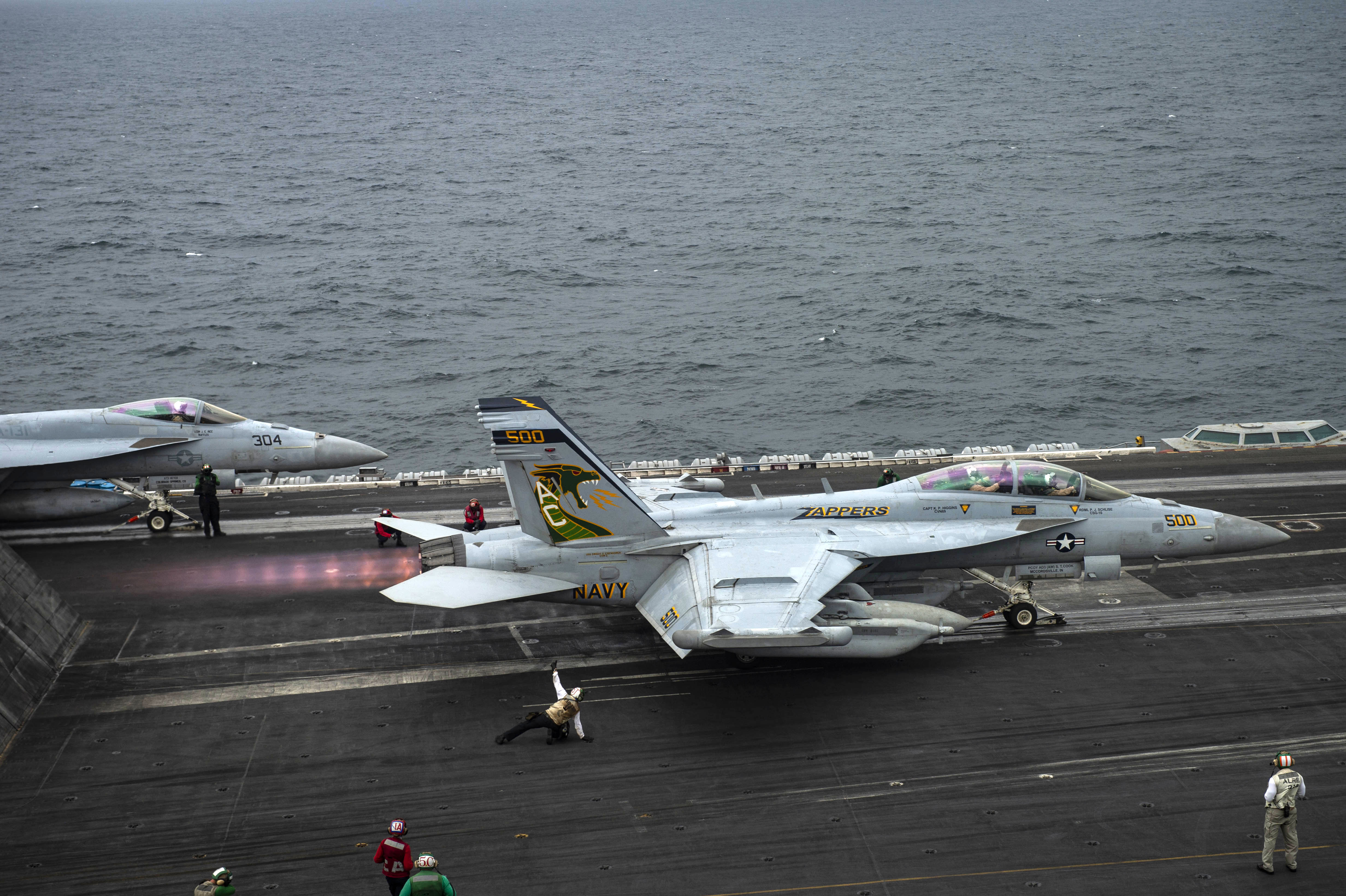
VAQ-130 EA-18G launches from USS Dwight D. Eisenhower in 2020

=== VAW-13 ===
The squadron was originally commissioned as Carrier Airborne Early Warning Squadron Thirteen (VAW-13) flying AD-5Qs in 1959.

During the Vietnam War detachments from VAW-13 were deployed on the following aircraft carriers operating on Yankee and Dixie Stations:

- 6 March-23 November 1965, Detachment, EA-1Fs were embarked on USS Midway
- 5 April-16 December 1965, Detachment, EA-1Fs were embarked on USS Oriskany
- 10 May-13 December 1965, Detachment, EA-1Fs were embarked on USS Independence
- 21 April 1965 – 13 January 1966, Detachment, EA-1Fs were embarked on USS Bon Homme Richard
- 12 May-3 December 1966, Detachment, EA-1Fs were embarked on USS Constellation
- 21 June 1966 – 21 February 1967, Detachment 42, EA-1Fs were embarked on USS Franklin D. Roosevelt
- 26 January-25 August 1967, Detachment 31, EA-1Fs were embarked on USS Bon Homme Richard
- 29 April-4 December 1967, Detachment, EA-1Fs were embarked on USS Constellation
- 16 June 1967 – 31 January 1968, Detachment, EA-1Fs were embarked on USS Oriskany
- 29 July 1967 – 6 April 1968, Detachment, EA-1Fs were embarked on USS Coral Sea
- 4 November 1967 – 25 May 1968, Detachment 61, EKA-3Bs were embarked on USS Ranger
- 18 November 1967 – 28 June 1968, Detachment 63, EKA-3Bs were embarked on USS Kitty Hawk
- 3 January-18 July 1968, Detachment 65, EKA-3Bs were embarked on USS Enterprise
- 27 January-10 October 1968, Detachment 31, EKA-3Bs were embarked on USS Bon Homme Richard
- 10 April-16 December 1968, Detachment 66, EKA-3Bs were embarked on USS America
- 29 May 1968 – 21 January 1969, Detachment 64, EKA-3Bs were embarked on USS Constellation
- 18 July 1968 – 3 March 1969, Detachment 19, EKA-3Bs were embarked on USS Hancock
- 7 September 1968 – 18 April 1969, Detachment 43, EKA-3Bs were embarked on USS Coral Sea

=== VAQ-130 ===
On 1 October 1968, the squadron was re-designated Electronic Attack Squadron 130 and placed under Tactical Electronic Warfare Wing Thirteen (VAQW-13).

VAQ-130 detachments continued to deploy in support of the Vietnam War as follows:

- 26 October 1968 – 17 May 1969, Detachment 61, EKA-3Bs were embarked on USS Ranger
- 1 February-18 September 1969, Detachment 14, EKA-3Bs were embarked on USS Ticonderoga
- 18 March-29 October 1968, Detachment 31, EKA-3Bs were embarked on USS Bon Homme Richard
- 14 April-17 November 1969, Detachment 34, EKA-3Bs were embarked on USS Oriskany
- 2 April-12 November 1970, Detachment 31, EKA-3Bs were embarked on USS Bon Homme Richard
- 14 May-10 December 1970, Detachment 1, EKA-3Bs were embarked on USS Oriskany
- 16 April-6 November 1971, Detachment 2, EKA-3Bs were embarked on USS Midway
- 14 May-10 December 1971, Detachment 3, EKA-3Bs were embarked on USS Oriskany
- 11 June 1971 – 12 February 1972, Detachment 4, EKA-3Bs were embarked on USS Enterprise
- 1 October 1971 – 30 June 1972, Detachment 1, EKA-3Bs were embarked on USS Constellation
- 10 April 1972 – 3 March 1973, Detachment 2, EKA-3Bs were embarked on USS Midway
- 5 June 1972 – 30 March 1973, Detachment 3, EKA-3Bs were embarked on USS Oriskany
- 16 November 1973 – 23 June 1973, Detachment 4, EKA-3Bs were embarked on USS Ranger
- 18 October 1973 – 5 June 1974, Detachment 3, EKA-3Bs were embarked on USS Oriskany

In March 1975, the squadron relocated to their current homeport of Naval Air Station Whidbey Island and transitioned to the EA-6B Prowler.

In December 2010, the squadron returned from their last fleet deployment flying the EA-6B Prowler and began transition training in March 2011 to the EA-18G Growler; the "Zappers" completed transition training in November 2011. The squadron deployed aboard USS Harry S. Truman in July 2013 following a year-long work-up cycle.

In 2017, two naval aviators attached to VAQ-130 were disciplined for drawing a phallus in the sky over Okanogan County, Washington.

In August 2020, the squadron returns from its 206-day deployment aboard USS Dwight D. Eisenhower (CVN-69), earning the Iron Shellback status for crossing the line after 100 days without hitting a port. The deployment broke the record for longest deployment without hitting a port, breaking the last record holder to USS Theodore Roosevelt (CVN-71) with 160 consecutive days.

In October 2023, VAQ-130 began a combat deployment within Air Wing Three onboard USS Eisenhower. The deployment focused heavily within the CENTCOM AOR. For the majority of the deployment, VAQ-130 operated off the deck of the Eisenhower while in the Red Sea, with some operations conducted from US land bases in theater. Extensive combat operations were conducted by VAQ-130 against Houthi-Iranian military units in Yemen.

During the deployment, the "Zappers" destroyed a Houthi-Iranian Mi-24/35 Hind helicopter on the ground, while conducting strikes in Yemen. VAQ-130 was heavily involved in defensive and offensive operations against Houthi-Iranian attacks against international shipping lanes and Israel.

On October 15, 2024, an EA-18G Growler assigned to VAQ-130 "Zappers" crashed near Mt. Rainer in Washington. The wreckage was found the following day, and the remains of the crew were found five days later. The aircraft crew members were identified as Lieutenant Serena Wileman, USN Naval Aviator and Lieutenant Commander Lyndsay Evans, USN Naval Flight Officer. They were both 31 years of age. The cause of the crash is under investigation.

VAQ-130 participated in the action resulting in the 2026 Capture of Nicolás Maduro, where it may have suppressed Venezuelan S-300 anti-aircraft missile systems, according to the Wall Street Journal.

== See also ==
- History of the United States Navy
- List of United States Navy aircraft squadrons
