= Expeditionary maneuver warfare =

Warfare concept of the United States Marine Corps

Expeditionary maneuver warfare (EMW) is the concept that guides how the United States Marine Corps organizes, deploys and employs its forces. Utilizing maneuver warfare and expeditionary warfare, EMW emphasizes strategically agile and tactically flexible Marine Air Ground Task Forces able to project power against critical points in the littorals and beyond.

EMW was designed to fit the United States Navy's "Sea Basing" concept as outlined in the Sea Power 21 plan.

It has influenced Marine Corps equipment procurement, leading to the purchase of the MV-22 Osprey, Expeditionary Fighting Vehicle, F-35B Lightning II, CH-53K King Stallion and the M777 Lightweight Howitzer.

Two areas of concern are not overburdening the maneuver force with too many supplies (or worse, having them run out) and timely medical evacuation.

== See also ==
- Military logistics
- Military Sealift Command
