= HSC-7 =

Helicopter Sea Combat Squadron 7
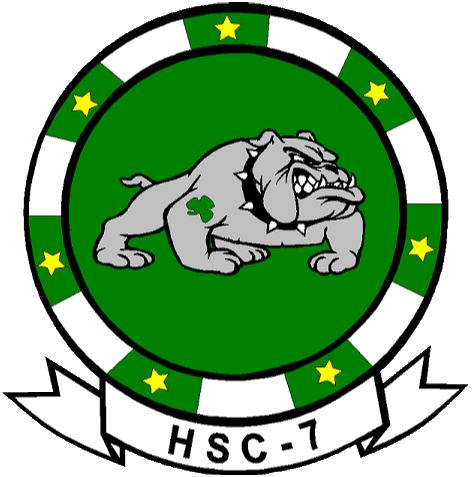
- HSC-7 Dusty Dogs insignia
- Active: 15 December 1969 – present
- Country: United States
- Branch: United States Navy
- Type: Helicopter Squadron
- Part of: Carrier Air Wing 3
- Garrison/HQ: Naval Station Norfolk
- Nickname: "Dusty Dogs"
- Engagements: Gulf War; Operation Uphold Democracy; Bosnian War; NATO intervention in Bosnia and Herzegovina; Operation Deny Flight; Operation Desert Fox; War on terror; Operation Iraqi Freedom; Operation Enduring Freedom; Operation Inherent Resolve

Commanders
- Current commander: Commander Kevin M. Chambley

Insignia
- Call sign: Dusty

Aircraft flown
- Helicopter: MH-60S Knighthawk

Helicopter Sea Combat Squadron Seven (HSC-7), also known as the Dusty Dogs, is a United States Navy helicopter squadron located at Naval Station Norfolk, Virginia. They are attached to Carrier Air Wing Three and deploy aboard USS Dwight D. Eisenhower.

== History ==
HSC-7 traces its lineage to the second of two squadrons which have borne the designation Helicopter Antisubmarine Squadron Seven (HS-7). That squadron which has become HSC-7 was established on 15 December 1969.

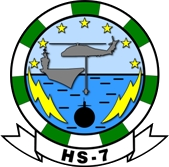
Squadron insignia used during most of the period of designation as HS-7

== 1956–1966 ==
The first squadron designated Helicopter Anti-Submarine Squadron 7 or HS-7 was established on 2 April 1956 at Naval Air Station Norfolk, Virginia for the purpose of harbor defense. The squadron was known as the "Big Dippers" and flew the HSS-1 Seabat. By 1960 the squadron had been assigned the role of Antisubmarine Warfare in support of fleet ships. The squadron deployed aboard USS Valley Forge flying the autopilot equipped HSS-1N Seabat giving it the ability to operate at night and in marginal weather. in September 1962 the squadron's helicopters were re-designated the SH-34J Seabat in compliance with the 1962 United States Tri-Service aircraft designation system. From at least January 1965 (and probably before that), until it was disestablished on 31 May 1966, it was deployed aboard USS Randolph, used Sikorsky SH-3A Sea King helicopters, and was known as "The Big Dippers."

== 1969–1980 ==
On 15 December 1969, the second squadron designated HS-7 and the squadron which has become HSC-7 was established at NAS Quonset Point, Rhode Island. It was equipped with the Sikorsky SH-3D Sea King and it adopted the name "Big Dippers" in honor of the previous HS-7. During a respite between cruises in 1970–71, the squadron held a naming contest, resulting in the "Big Dippers" becoming the 'Shamrocks'. In 1973, HS-7 joined Carrier Air Wing Three (CVW-3), changed homeport to Naval Air Station Jacksonville, Florida, with assignment to USS Saratoga, and transitioned to the venerable SH-3H Sea King helicopter.

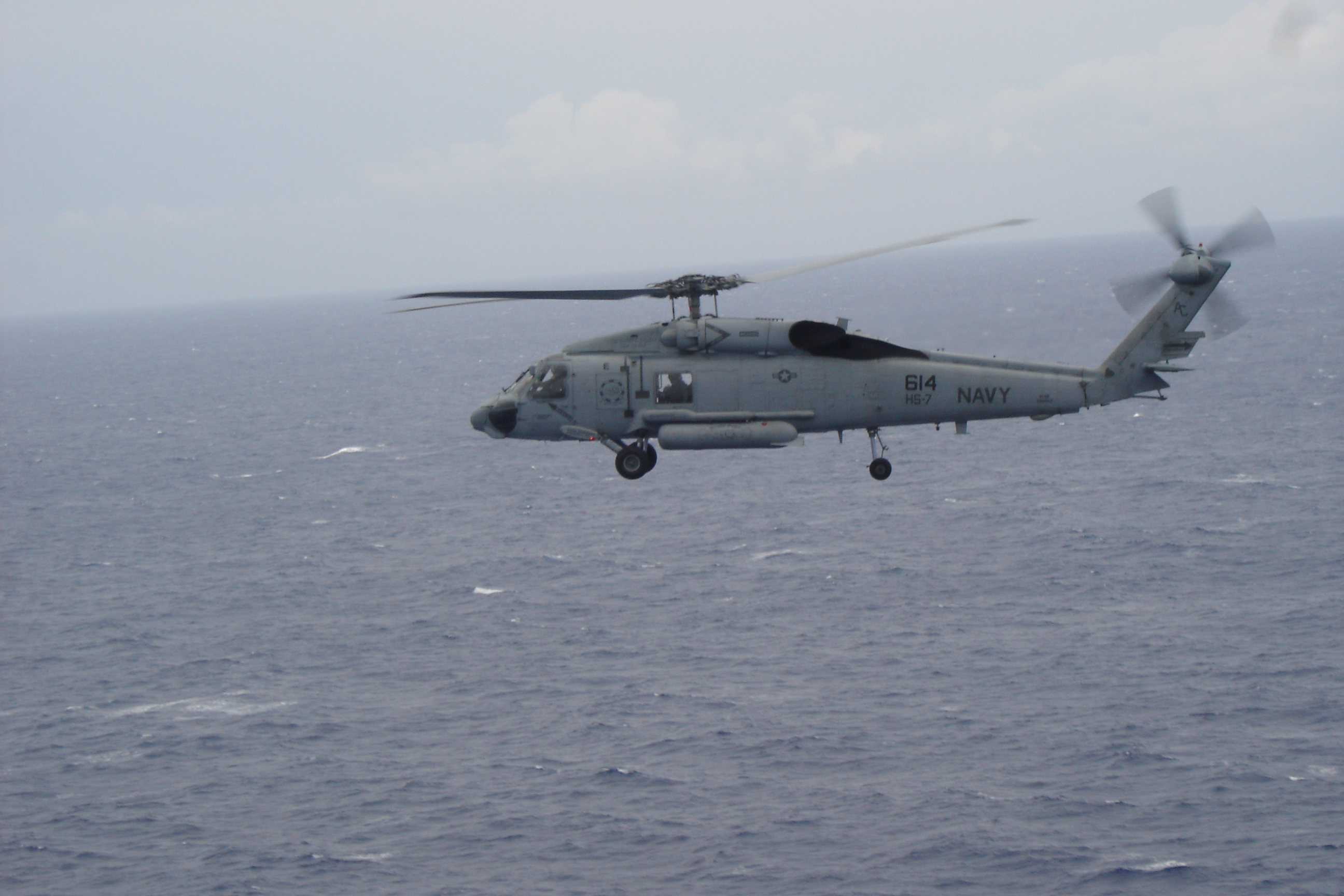
Dusty 614 in the Atlantic

The 'Shamrocks' deployed her next cruise with CVW-3 (AC) and USS Saratoga, HS-7 commanded by Commander H. Price. The cruise from 6 January to 28 July 1976, took place in the Mediterranean Sea, with port visits to Rota, Malaga, and Palma de Mallorca, Spain, Taranto, and Naples, Italy, Split, Croatia, Cannes, France, Genoa, Italy, Monaco, and Barcelona, Spain.

== 1980–2000 ==
From 1981 to 1997, the 'Shamrocks' deployed numerous times in USS John F. Kennedy, In 1988 HS-7 changed their name to 'Dusty Dogs', and under that name continued with CVW-3 aboard John F. Kennedy, including deployments in support of Operations Desert Shield and Desert Storm during the Gulf War.

In December 1993, the 'Dusty Dogs' and CVW-3 shifted to USS Dwight D. Eisenhower. In 1994, HS-7 became the first HS squadron on the east coast to be assigned female sailors and officers. In September 1994, HS-7 was tasked to support Dwight D. Eisenhower which had embarked the US Army's 10th Mountain Division off the coast of Haiti during Operation Uphold Democracy. Later that same year, HS-7 deployed to the Persian Gulf in support of Operation SOUTHERN WATCH and to the Adriatic Sea during Operations Deny Flight and Provide Promise.

Upon returning from Dwight D. Eisenhower in 1995, the 'Dusty Dogs' transitioned to the Sikorsky SH-60F and HH-60H helicopters. In May 1997, the squadron completed its first deployment flying the new aircraft from USS Theodore Roosevelt. HS-7 deployed again from October 1998 to May 1999 in USS Enterprise in support of Operations Desert Fox and Deliberate Forge.

== 2000–2010 ==
Departing in late 2000, attached to Carrier Air Wing Three (CVW-3) the wing completed the maiden cruise of USS Harry S. Truman returning in June 2001. From December 2002 to April 2005, HS-7 deployed twice more onboard Harry S. Truman. During the 2003 cruise, the ship and airwing served in the Mediterranean and Adriatic Seas in support of Operation Northern Watch and Iraqi Freedom. In September 2005, HS-7 embarked in Harry S. Truman, went to the Gulf of Mexico in support of Hurricane Katrina relief efforts. During Joint Task Force Katrina, HS-7 conducted 222 evacuations, 500 rescues, 90 MEDEVACS, and delivered over 27,000 pounds (12,000 kg) of food, supplies, and other essential cargo. From November 2007 to June 2008, the Dusty Dogs again deployed aboard TRUMAN with CVW-3 in support of Operations IRAQI FREEDOM and ENDURING FREEDOM. From June 2008 to May 2010 the Dusty Dogs met the challenges of an extended workup cycle, which included eight at-sea periods, two air wing trips to NAS Fallon, and four detachments to the Atlantic Undersea Test and Evaluation Center (AUTEC).

== 2010 onwards ==
HSC-7 rescuing hurricane victims in 2017

A detachment from HS-7 deployed to USS Carl Vinson and CVW-17 during Operation Unified Response, the United States military's response to the 2010 Haiti earthquake from 13–31 January 2010, before returning to CVW-3 and Harry S. Truman.

In May 2010, HS-7, attached to CVW-3, departed aboard USS Harry S. Truman for a seven-month deployment to the 5th Fleet AOR. The Dusty Dogs supported CSG-10 assets participating in Operations ENDURING FREEDOM and NEW DAWN while providing the Strike Group with essential anti-terrorism force protection, logistic, MEDEVAC, and SAR support. Cruise highlights include the night rescue of eight Iranian mariners in the North Arabian Sea and joint rotary-wing training with the Royal Air Force of Oman – a first in the history of the U.S. Naval helicopter aviation. In November 2010, after 54 years of excellence in Anti-submarine warfare, HS-7 sundowned their ASW mission when they went "ball dry" for the last time.

On 15 April 2011, Helicopter Antisubmarine Squadron SEVEN was re-designated Helicopter Sea Combat Squadron SEVEN (HSC-7). From there the squadron moved to Norfolk, Virginia, and successfully completed their transition to the MH-60S. At the end of 2012, HSC-7 began the first of their deployment workups in the MH-60S.

From July 2013 to April 2014, HSC-7 launched its inaugural MH-60S deployment in support of Operation ENDURING FREEDOM. During this deployment the Dusty Dogs received outstanding news that one of their crews being selected as Naval Helicopter Association (NHA) East Coast deployed Aircrew of the Year who successfully MEDEVACed a civilian merchant from a foreign vessel, flying the patient into Muscat, Oman. Following deployment, HSC-7 helped to develop the launch and recovery procedures for the LAU-61A/C rocket pod system into and out of Naval Station Norfolk.

2015 into 2016 was another year filled with workups for the next upcoming deployment. From June 2016 to December 2016 HSC-7 deployed aboard USS Dwight D. Eisenhower in support of Operation Inherent Resolve. Over 2,800 flight hours were flown on deployment with a detachment aboard USNS Arctic, transferring more than three and a half million pounds of cargo. From August to November of 2017, the Dusty Dogs flew over 235 flight hours during their Defense Support to Civil Authority (DSCA) operations following Hurricanes Harvey, Irma, and Maria in Texas and Puerto Rico. During the relief operations, over 200 sorties were flown accounting for the transportation of 1, 566 passengers, 966,000 pounds (438,000 kg) of cargo, and 850 flying hours.

In July 2019, HSC-7 participated in exercises such as Helicopter Advanced Readiness Program (HARP), Tailored Ship’s Training Availability (TSTA), and Air Wing Fallon.

Between January and July 2021, HSC-7 embarked on a seven month deployment to the AOR of the 5th and 6th Fleet in support of Operation Inherent Resolve and Operation Freedom's Sentinel.

In October 2023, HSC-7 deployed with Air Wing Three onboard the USS Eisenhower. HSC-7 and Air Wing Three were deployed immediately to the CENTCOM AOR and began defensive and offensive combat operations against the Houthi-Iranian military units in Yemen.

== See also ==
- History of the United States Navy
- List of United States Navy aircraft squadrons
