= Warhammer =

Warhammer may refer to:

- War hammer, a medieval weapon

== Warhammer franchise ==
- Warhammer, a series of games and related media:
  - Warhammer (game), a table-top fantasy miniature wargame, and origin of the franchise
  - Warhammer Fantasy (setting), the fictional setting of the various games and media
  - Warhammer Age of Sigmar, the successor to Warhammer
  - Warhammer Fantasy Roleplay, a fantasy role-playing game
  - Warhammer Quest, a board game
- Warhammer 40,000, a table-top futuristic science-fantasy miniature wargame
- Video games set in the Warhammer universe:
  - Warhammer: Shadow of the Horned Rat, a 1995 real-time tactics video game
  - Warhammer: Dark Omen, a 1998 real-time tactics video game
  - Warhammer: Battle for Atluma, a 2006 video game adaptation of the WarCry collectible card game
  - Warhammer: Mark of Chaos, a 2006 real-time tactics video game
  - Warhammer Online: Age of Reckoning, a 2008 massively multiplayer online role-playing game (MMORPG)
  - Warhammer Quest (video game series), a 2013 tactical role-playing video game
  - Warhammer: End Times – Vermintide, a 2015 co-operative first person video game
  - Total War: Warhammer, a 2016 turn-based strategy real-time tactics video game
  - Warhammer Quest 2: The End Times (video game series), a 2017 tactical role-playing video game
  - Total War: Warhammer II, a 2017 turn-based strategy real-time tactics video game
  - Warhammer: Vermintide 2, a 2018 co-operative first person video game
  - Warhammer: Chaosbane, a 2019 adventure game
  - Total War: Warhammer III, a 2022 turn-based strategy real-time tactics video game
  - Warhammer 40,000: Darktide, a 2022 co-operative first person video game
  - Warhammer 40,000: Space Marine, a 2011 third-person shooter hack and slash video game, and Warhammer 40,000: Space Marine 2, its 2024 sequel
- Ultramarines: A Warhammer 40,000 Movie, a 2010 British adult animated action science fiction film

== See also ==
- Hammer (disambiguation)
- War (disambiguation)
- Operation Hammer (disambiguation), military operations named "Hammer"
- Hammer and sickle (disambiguation)
- Arm and hammer (disambiguation)
- Battleaxe (disambiguation)
