= VFA-136 =

Strike Fighter Squadron 136
- Active: 1 July 1985 - present
- Country: United States
- Branch: United States Navy
- Type: Fighter/Attack
- Role: Close air support Air interdiction Aerial reconnaissance
- Part of: Carrier Air Wing Three
- Garrison/HQ: NAS Lemoore
- Nickname: "Knighthawks"
- Engagements: Gulf War; Operation Deny Flight; Operation Vigilant Warrior; Operation Southern Watch; Operation Enduring Freedom; Operation Prosperity Guardian; Operation Poseidon Archer

Commanders
- Commanding Officer: CDR. Dustin “Doorman” Detrick
- Executive Officer: CDR. Bernard "Virus" Lutz
- Command Master Chief: CMDCM. Karin R. Wittig

Aircraft flown
- Fighter: F/A-18 Hornet; F/A-18E Super Hornet

Strike Fighter Squadron 136 (VFA-136) also known as the "Knighthawks" is a United States Navy strike fighter squadron based at Naval Air Station Lemoore, California. The "Knighthawks" are an operational fleet squadron flying the F/A-18E Super Hornet. They are homeported at NAS Lemoore and are currently assigned to Carrier Air Wing Three, tail code AC. Their radio callsign is Gunstar.

== Squadron insignia and nickname ==
The squadron's "Knighthawk" insignia and nickname were approved by Chief of Naval Operations on 23 May 1985 and have remained unchanged.

== History ==
=== 1980s ===
Strike Fighter Squadron One Three Six was established on 1 July 1985 at Naval Air Station Lemoore, California under the instruction of VFA-125. The squadron received their first F/A-18A Hornet on 7 January 1986, and a month later they moved to their new homeport of Naval Air Station Cecil Field, Florida.

VFA-136 first deployed in September 1987 with Carrier Air Wing Thirteen on board USS Coral Sea. One year later, they joined Carrier Air Wing Seven on USS Dwight D. Eisenhower.

=== 1990s ===
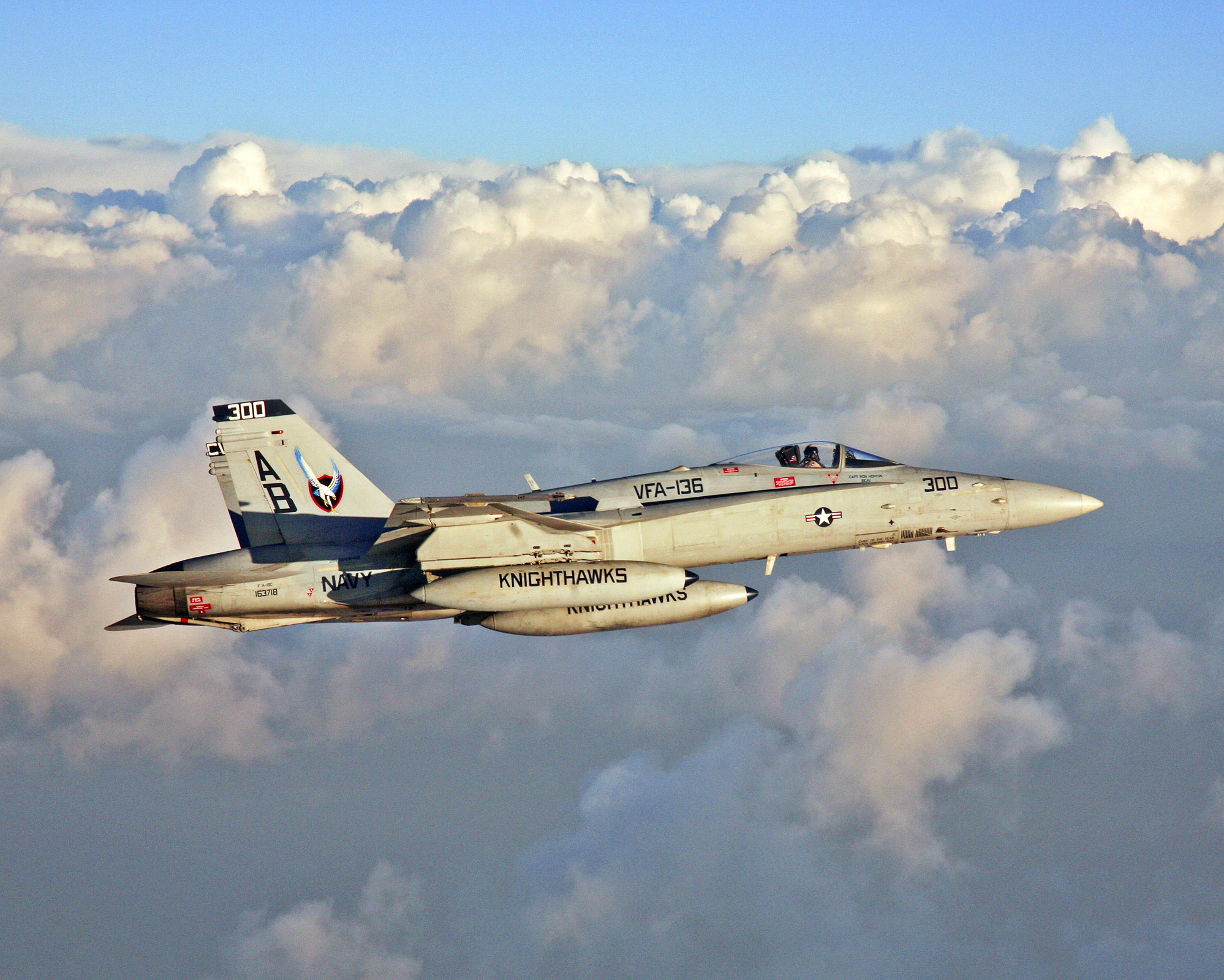
VFA-136 F/A-18C Hornet in 2007

During USS Dwight D. Eisenhower's "Centennial Cruise" in 1990, the squadron participated in exercises with French, British, Italian and Tunisian forces. The cruise took a serious turn after Iraq invaded Kuwait on 2 August 1990. In support of Operation Desert Shield, USS Dwight D. Eisenhower was on station in the Red Sea within 36 hours, becoming the first carrier to conduct sustained operations in the area. After returning from deployment in November 1990, the squadron upgraded to the new Lot 13 Night Attack F/A-18C. The squadron became the first fully operational night strike Hornet squadron in the Navy.

In October 1991, the squadron and USS Dwight D. Eisenhower were back in the Persian Gulf enforcing the peace accords set after Operation Desert Storm. Upon completion of those operations, the team transitioned to the North Atlantic to participate in the North Atlantic Treaty Organization (NATO) Exercise "TEAMWORK '92". This would be the largest NATO exercise in over three years.

The squadron next deployed aboard the Navy's newest aircraft carrier, USS George Washington for her maiden cruise in May 1994. USS George Washington was the flagship for the celebration of the 50th Anniversary of D-Day, hosting President Bill Clinton. During the cruise, the squadron participated in NATO Operations Deny Flight (over Bosnia-Herzegovina), Southern Watch and Vigilant Warrior (both in the Persian Gulf). In addition to supporting NATO, the squadron also participated in exercises in England, France, Sicily, Jordan, Tunisia, Bahrain and Oman. The squadron returned from deployment in November 1994.

The squadron deployed again aboard USS George Washington in January 1996 in support of Operation Decisive Endeavor over Bosnia-Herzegovina and Operation Southern Watch.

In February 1998, VFA-136 embarked on the maiden deployment of USS John C. Stennis. This "world cruise" included a tour of duty in the Persian Gulf in support of Operation Southern Watch and culminated in the arrival of USS John C. Stennis in their new homeport of San Diego, California.

Immediately following this deployment, the squadron relocated to Naval Air Station Oceana in December 1998 as mandated by the Base Realignment and Closure decision.

=== 2000s ===
In February 2000, the squadron embarked aboard USS Dwight D. Eisenhower to the Mediterranean. In March 2000, the squadron flew in support of the Dayton Accords governing the peace between the former warring factions in Bosnia and other parts of the Balkans. USS Dwight D. Eisenhower then proceeded to the Persian Gulf, in support of Operation Southern Watch, returning to Norfolk on 18 August 2000.

In August 2010 the squadron won the Strike Fighter Weapons School Atlantic (SFWSL) Bombing Derby trophy for the first time in the squadron's history. The squadron also won the 2010 CVW-1 Top Hook Award.

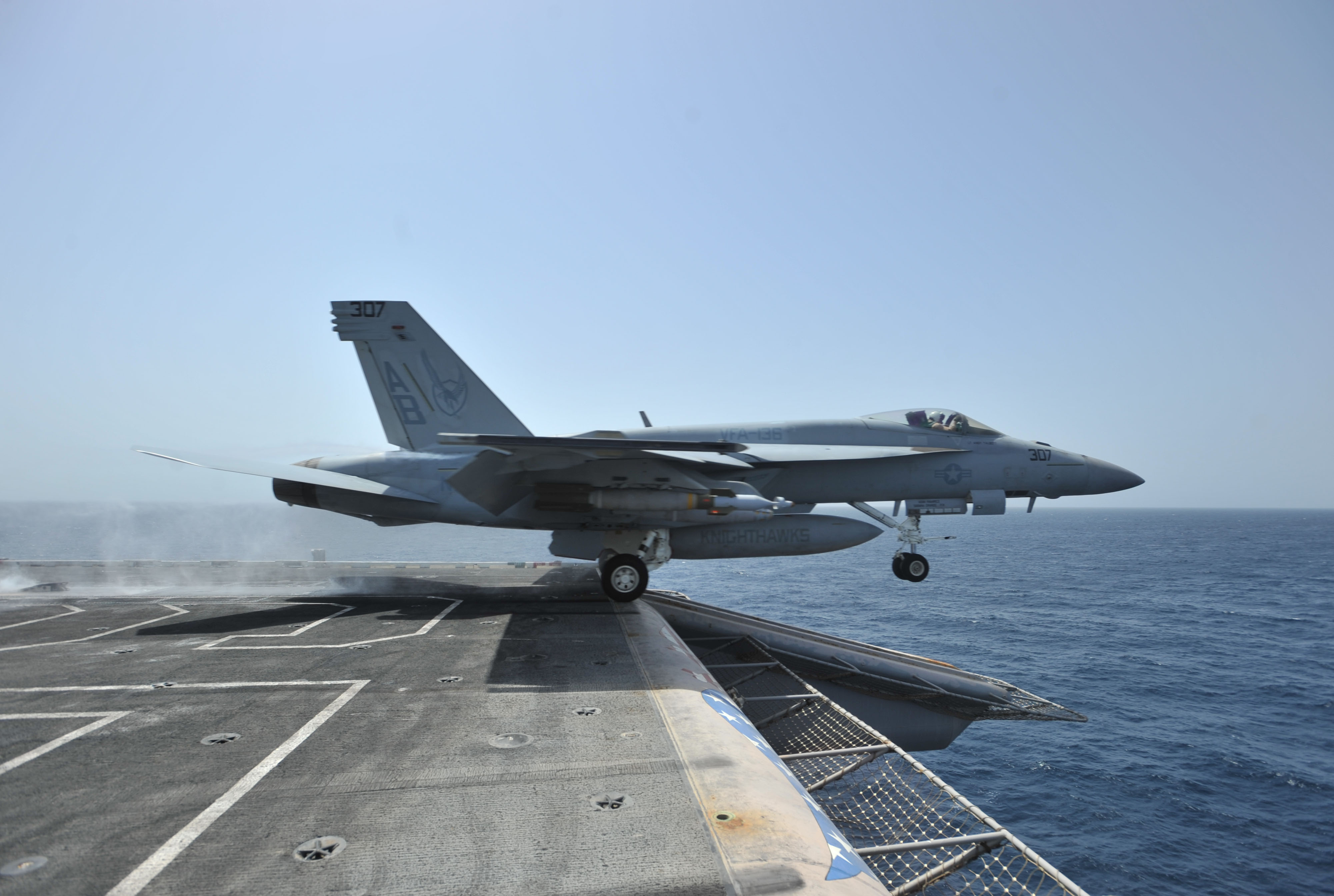
VFA-136 F/A-18E launches from USS Enterprise in 2011

In January 2011, the squadron embarked on a deployment to the Mediterranean Sea, the North Arabian Sea, and Persian Gulf aboard USS Enterprise. While deployed, the squadron flew combat sorties in the skies over Afghanistan in support Operation Enduring Freedom and over Iraq in support of Operation New Dawn while also supporting anti-piracy operations and special forces in multiple theaters. The squadron won their tenth straight CVW-1 Top Hook Award posting a 3.706 with a 96% boarding rate for the duration of cruise.

Following deployment, the squadron were awarded their second straight Strike Fighter Weapons School Atlantic (SFWSL) Bombing Derby trophy. In 2011 the squadron won the Battle Effectiveness Award for the first time in the squadron's twenty-six-year history.

In the summer of 2016, the squadron was moved from NAS Oceana to NAS Lemoore.

The squadron was expected to deploy aboard the USS Harry S. Truman in September 2019 but, due to extensive electrical problems, the Truman was unable to get underway until November 2019 with an expected return in March 2020. The Truman and associated Strike Group were mere hours from beginning their transit through the Red Sea and, ultimately, the Suez Canal to begin their voyage home when they were ordered to remain on station due to hostilities with Iran. The Strike Group was again extended due to COVID-19, finally returning to homeport in Norfolk, VA in June 2020 after spending nearly four months straight without a port visit, two months of which were off the eastern coast of the United States.

In 2021, the Knighthawks were reassigned to Carrier Air Wing 7 on the USS George H. W. Bush.

In 2023, the Knighthawks were transferred back to Carrier Air Wing 1 and USS Harry S. Truman.

In late September 2024, VFA-136 and their F/A-18Es departed the US as part of CVW-1 on a scheduled deployment aboard the USS Harry S. Truman.

Following multiple exercises with European militaries, VFA-136 and CVW-1 were ordered to operate in the Red Sea in defense of international shipping lanes and Israel against Houthi/Iran proxy military unit attacks from Yemen. VFA-136 and CVW-1 arrived in the CENTCOM AOR in mid December 2024 with combat operations against the Houthis/Iranians commencing upon arrival to the Red Sea.

Airstrikes were undertaken against the Houthis/Iranians for much of the later half of December 2024 through April 2025. Strikes against the Houthis/Iranian proxy military units in Yemen increased significantly following March 15, 2025, with VFA-136 and CVW-1 conducting increased sorties on a larger set of enemy targets.

28 April of 2025, an F/A-18E from VFA-136 fell off the deck of the USS Harry S. Truman while the ship was taking evasive maneuvers from a Houthi attack.

== See also ==
- List of United States Navy aircraft squadrons
- Naval aviation
- Modern US Navy carrier air operations
- List of Inactive United States Navy aircraft squadrons
