= British logistics in the Second Boer War =

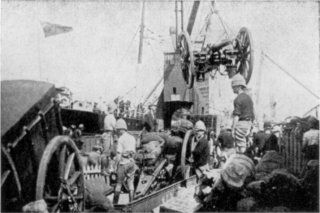
Field guns of 21 Battery RFA arriving in Durban from India during the Second Boer War.

The Second Boer War (1899–1902) involved a global logistics effort to provide that which is needed as part of any military action, as well as, the local conditions that require out of the area resources be imported due, as in the case with southern Africa, the limited amount available from local sources or the loss of local sources due to the hostilities. According to the contemporary military writer, Alfred Thayer Mahan, the "transportation" required by the war in South Africa was "an incident unprecedented, and in its success unsurpassed, in military history."

== Overview ==
Animals were an important part of the supply load, drawn from across the British Empire as well as Europe and the Americas. 360,000 horses out of a total of 519,000, had to be shipped into South Africa. 106,000 mules and donkeys out of a total of 151,000 were also brought into the region for the war. Food was brought from Britain. The British drew upon food reserves that were kept at Woolwich, London, prior to the war. By 30 September 1900, 298,000 water bottles, 41,000 camp kettles, and 384,000 bars of soap had been purchased in Britain and sent to South Africa. With the collieries of the Transvaal unavailable and those of Natal under enemy occupation, there were limited stocks of coal in South Africa. The naval base at Simon's Town near Cape Town had only a reserve of 13,000 tons at the start of the war. Much of this too had to be transported from Britain. Construction material was sent. Enough was shipped to rebuild destroyed railway bridges along the whole length of the Orange Free State. 118,000 rifles, 8,500 carbines, and 2,300 pistols were sent out between 1 June 1899 and the end of the war. Accompanying these were 139 million rounds of small arms ammunition.

With South Africa located 6,000 miles from Britain, the logistics needs of the war put its shipping under strain. This was despite the country possessing the world's largest merchant marine fleet. As a result, the British attempted to obtain as much as possible from within the region. 159,000 horses were sourced from within South Africa, as were 45,000 mules and donkeys. Trek oxen were almost entirely locally sourced. 150,000 were used in the first 15 months. The British bought 2,163 wagons and carts with the Cape Colony and Natal during the war as well hiring a further 1,400 ox wagons up to March 1900. Local companies were contracted as suppliers, principal of which was Julius Weil. Orders for railway rolling stock were placed within South Africa. Manufacture was carried out at Salt River in Cape Town, Uitenhage outside Port Elizabeth, and East London.

Much food was also bought locally. The supply of meat to the troops at the Cape was contracted out to the South African Cold Storage Company. The British also grew and raised their own locally produced food. During the guerrilla phase of the war they took control of 70 vacant Boer farms for this purpose. Even land around blockhouses and lines of communication was cultivated.

== Bibliography ==
- Alfred Thayer Mahan The Story of the War in South Africa 1899–1900 (London: Sampson Low, Marston and Company, 1900).
- K. Webb, The Continued Importance of Geographic Distance and Boulding's Loss of Strength Gradient, Comparative Strategy, Volume 26, Issue 4, 2007.
