= Carrier Air Wing Three =

Carrier Air Wing 3
- CVW-3 Insignia
- Active: 1 July 1938 - Present
- Country: United States
- Branch: United States Navy
- Type: Carrier Air Wing
- Part of: Carrier Strike Group 2
- Garrison/HQ: NAS Oceana; USS Dwight D. Eisenhower (CVN-69)
- Nickname: "Battle Axe"
- Tail Code: AC
- Engagements: World War II; Korean War; Vietnam War; Operation Desert Shield; Operation Desert Storm; Operation Desert Fox; Operation Enduring Freedom; Operation Iraqi Freedom; Operation Inherent Resolve; 2024 missile strikes in Yemen
- Decorations: Presidential Unit Citation; Asiatic Pacific Campaign Medal (6); United Nations Service Medal; Korean Service Medal (2); Navy Unit Commendation (2); China Service Medal; Meritorious Unit Commendation; Armed Forces Expeditionary Medal

Commanders
- Notable commanders: Frederick C. Turner; Joseph F. Kilkenny

Carrier Air Wing Three (CVW-3), known as the "Battle Axe", is a United States Navy aircraft carrier air wing based at Naval Air Station Oceana, Virginia. The air wing is currently attached to the aircraft carrier USS Dwight D. Eisenhower. The wing was created on 1 July 1938 and has seen service in World War II, the Korean War, the Cuban Missile Crisis, the Vietnam War, Lebanon, against Libya, and the Global War on Terror.

== Mission ==
"To conduct carrier air warfare operations and assist in the planning, control, coordination and integration of seven air wing squadrons in support of carrier air warfare including; Interception and destruction of enemy aircraft and missiles in all-weather conditions to establish and maintain local air superiority. All-weather offensive air-to-surface attacks, Detection, localization, and destruction of enemy ships and submarines to establish and maintain local sea control. Aerial photographic, sighting, and electronic intelligence for naval and joint operations. Airborne early warning service to fleet forces and shore warning nets. Airborne electronic countermeasures. In-flight refueling operations to extend the range and the endurance of air wing aircraft and Search and rescue operations."

== Subordinate units ==
CVW-3 consists of eight squadrons:

Code	Insignia	Squadron	Nickname	Assigned Aircraft
VFA-32		Strike Fighter Squadron 32	Swordsmen	F/A-18F Super Hornet
VFA-143		Strike Fighter Squadron 143	Pukin Dogs	F/A-18E Super Hornet
VFA-34		Strike Fighter Squadron 34	Blue Blasters	F/A-18E Super Hornet
VFA-136		Strike Fighter Squadron 136	KnightHawks	F/A-18E Super Hornet
VAW-123		Carrier Airborne Early Warning Squadron 123	Screwtops	E-2C Hawkeye
VAQ-130		Electronic Attack Squadron 130	Zappers	EA-18G Growler
VRC-40		Fleet Logistics Support Squadron 40 Det. 4	Rawhides	C-2A Greyhound
HSC-7		Helicopter Sea Combat Squadron 7	Dusty Dogs	MH-60S Seahawk
HSM-74		Helicopter Maritime Strike Squadron 74	Swamp Foxes	MH-60R Seahawk

== History ==
Squadrons assigned to the first carrier to bear the name (USS Saratoga) in 1928 were informally called the Saratoga Air Group. On 1 July 1938 the Saratoga Air Group was formally established as a unit. With the rapid fleet buildup of World War II, the Navy ceased naming its carrier air groups with the carrier's name and initially numbered them with the carrier's hull number, and on 25 September 1943 Saratoga Air Group was redesignated Carrier Air Group 3 (CVG-3). After the war, on 15 November 1946 the air group was redesignated in accordance with the Navy's new carrier air group designation scheme in which all remaining air groups were designated in accordance with the type of carrier to which they were assigned with those assigned to Essex-class aircraft carriers being designated "attack" carrier air groups and those assigned to the larger Midway-class aircraft carrier being designated battle carrier air groups and CVG-3 was redesignated CVAG-3. On 1 September 1948 the Navy again changed the carrier air group designation scheme; all CVAGs and CVBGs were designated CVGs and CVAG-3 once again became CVG-3. On 20 December 1963 all carrier air groups in existence were redesignated Carrier Air Wings (CVW) and Carrier Air Group 3 (CVG-3) was redesignated Carrier Air Wing 3 (CVW-3)

=== World War II ===
The wing was deployed on Saratoga until the ship was torpedoed in January 1942. Part of the wing was then deployed aboard USS Yorktown and helped cripple the Japanese aircraft carrier Sōryū during the Battle of Midway. The wing was also involved in the first carrier strikes against Tokyo, flying from USS Yorktown.

=== Cold War ===
In 1947, CVAG-3 was assigned to USS Kearsarge and made two deployments to the North Atlantic and the Mediterranean Sea in 1947 and 1948.

==== Korean War ====
The air wing was assigned to USS Leyte in 1949. In 1950, Leyte was recalled from the Mediterranean Sea and was deployed to Korea. The Wing flew in support of the Pusan Perimeter, the invasion on Wonsan and, and strikes on Hungnam Salient and Yalu River Bridges. The wing accumulated over 11,000 operational hours flying against the North Korean and Chinese Communist Forces. Following this deployment, CVG-3 made two more deployments to the Med aboard Leyte in 1951 and 1952-53, followed by a world cruise aboard USS Tarawa in 1953-54. In 1955-56, the wing was again in the Med aboard USS Ticonderoga, before being assigned to the newly commissioned USS Saratoga in 1957. The wing stayed aboard Saratoga until she entered her Service Life Extension Program (SLEP) in 1981.

==== Cuban Missile Crisis ====
During refresher training in the Caribbean Sea in December 1962, CVW-3 was on station during the Cuban Missile Crisis. Carrier Air Group 3 was redesignated Carrier Air Wing 3 on 20 December 1963.

At end of the 1960s the air wing took on Reserve Squadrons during the USS Pueblo incident. CVW-3 squadrons embarked with the Royal Navy's 892 Naval Air Squadron for two weeks, and flew in response to a number of events in the Mediterranean including; hijackings, internal fighting in Jordan, and the death of Egyptian President Nasser.

==== Vietnam ====
In the early 1970s CVW-3 began the task of testing the new CV Concept, to incorporating the missions of attack squadrons and anti-submarine submarine squadrons. After completing their missions successfully the CV Concept was validated and implemented. In 1972, CVW-3 was given 60 hours notice before deploying around South Africa en route to Vietnam. Operations there saw CVW-3 provide strike and support sorties in South Vietnam, Alpha strikes, AAW missions, and reconnaissance missions over North Vietnam. The wings first kill came on 21 June when an F-4J Phantom II shot down a MIG-21. Dropping over 14,000 tons of ordnance, CVW-3 spent 175 days on the line engaged in combat operations against North Vietnam.

==== Lebanon ====
CVW-3 was assigned to USS John F. Kennedy, in 1981 and participated in air strikes against Lebanon in support of US Marines stationed there.

==== Libya ====
In January 1989 two CVW-3 F-14 Tomcats shot down two hostile Libyan MIG-23 fighters over international waters in the Central Mediterranean. In August 1990, CVW-3 and John F. Kennedy departed on a no-notice Mediterranean/Red Sea deployment in support of Operation Desert Shield, and air crews later flew combat sorties in association with Operation Desert Storm against Iraq.

In 1994–95, CVW-3 made a single deployment aboard USS Dwight D. Eisenhower to the Mediterranean Sea. For the next deployment in 1996–97, the wing transferred to USS Theodore Roosevelt. The wing concluded a successful 24th Mediterranean Sea/Persian Gulf deployment aboard the USS Enterprise in 1998–99. During this time, the wing aircraft participated in Operation Desert Fox, a four-day strike campaign against Iraq in December 1998.

=== Global War on Terror ===
In 2000, CVW-3, was assigned to USS Harry S. Truman on her maiden deployment. The early months of 2001 saw the air wing operating in the Persian Gulf, conducting Response Options strikes, to include the largest strike over Iraq since Operation Desert Fox, in support of Operation Southern Watch and maritime interdiction operations. This was the longest period any carrier had spent in the Gulf since Operation Desert Storm. The Air Wing completed its 25th deployment and returned home on 23 May 2001.

On 5 December 2002, CVW-3 departed for its 26th deployment to the Mediterranean, in support of Operation Enduring Freedom and on 20 March 2003, CVW-3 began taking part in the Iraq War, flying defensive counter air missions in Western Iraq, launching aircraft off the coast of Egypt in the South Eastern Mediterranean. CVW-3 made four deployments aboard Harry S. Truman to the Mediterranean Sea and the Indian Ocean between 2004 and 2010.

==== 2013–2014 OEF Cruise ====
On 7 January 2013 Captain Sara A. Joyner, USN, took command of Carrier Air Wing Three, becoming the first woman to lead a U.S. Navy carrier air wing as well as the air wing's 57th CAG. Before assuming command of CVW-3, Joyner had served as its deputy commander. On 22 December 2013, Joyner was superseded by her air wing's deputy commander (DCAG), Capt. George Wikoff. After a period at NAVAIRLANT, in 2016 Joyner is Director, Senate Liaison Office, Office of Legislative Liaison, U.S. Department of the Navy.

CVW-3 completed a deployment to the U.S. 5th and 6th Fleet in April 2014, after nine months at sea. The air wing successfully supported US and coalition troops in Afghanistan, operated with the French aircraft carrier Charles de Gaulle, and conducted multiple liberty-as-a-mission port calls to Bahrain, Dubai, France and Spain.

In 2015, CVW-3 was reassigned to USS Dwight D. Eisenhower and deployed to the Mediterranean Sea and the Indian Ocean in 2016 and in 2021. On 31 March 2021, CVW-3 launched flight operations in support of Operation Inherent Resolve. The USS Dwight D. Eisenhower and its carrier strike group were expected to lead Task Force 50, which oversees Operation Inherent Resolve's naval strike operations.

== Current force ==
=== Fixed-wing aircraft ===
- F/A-18E/F Super Hornet
- EA-18G Growler
- E-2 Hawkeye
- C-2 Greyhound

=== Rotary wing aircraft ===
- MH-60R Seahawk
- MH-60S Knighthawk
