= Sea Power 21 =

In 2003 the United States Navy launched the Sea Power 21 transformation plan in an effort to make the Navy more flexible and more agile to effectively meet future threats.

There are three fundamental concepts in Sea Power 21.

- Sea Enterprise involves the improvement of organizational alignment, refining requirements, and reinvesting savings to help transform the Navy's headquarters, commands, and commanding officers. Sea Enterprise also provides a means to scrutinize the Navy's spending practices from the top line all the way to the bottom dollar.
- Sea Warrior intends to link the fleet's personnel processes (recruiting, training, and assigning) with acquisition processes (buying ships, aircraft, etc.) in a way that also improves each individual sailor's ability to guide his or her own career in a satisfying direction. Sea Warrior's aim is to more efficiently muster the right number of sailors with the right skills and seniority at each ship, squadron, and duty station, thereby enhancing the joint warfighting effectiveness of the entire Navy.
- Sea Trial entails the rapid development of technologies using experimentation and wargaming. The Commander of the United States Fleet Forces Command serves as the Executive Agent, and is supported by the Navy Warfare Development Command.
