= HMS Battleaxe =

Three ships of the Royal Navy have borne the name HMS Battleaxe:

- HMS Battleaxe (1916) was the former Russian trawler Safir launched in 1916 and taken up for Royal Navy use. She became the fishery protection trawler Dee in September, 1920.
- HMS Battleaxe was a Casa Grande-class dock landing ship launched in 1943 and transferred to the Royal Navy under lend-lease. She was renamed HMS Eastway (F140) shortly after being launched, and was returned to the US Navy in 1947, later transferred to Greece as Nafkratoussa.
- HMS Battleaxe (D18) was a Weapon-class destroyer launched in 1945 and broken up in 1964.
- HMS Battleaxe (F89) was a Type 22 frigate launched in 1977. She was sold to the Brazilian Navy in 1997 and renamed Rademaker.

== See also ==
- Empire Battleaxe, an infantry landing ship operated by the Ministry of War Transport.
