= 51st Troop Carrier Wing =

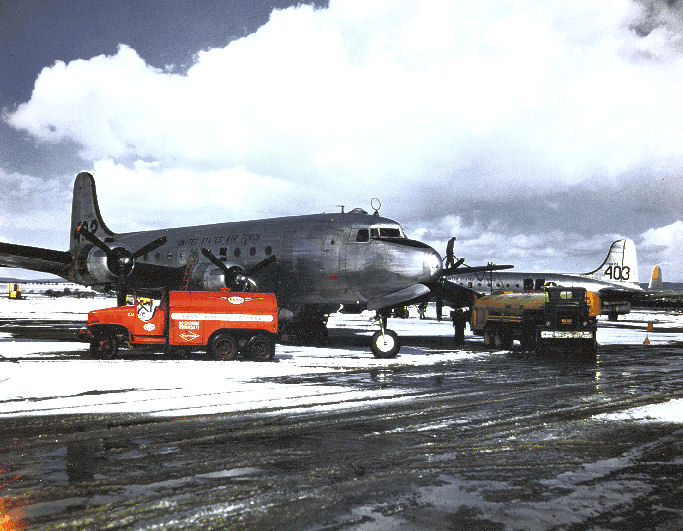
- Douglas C-54s of the wing's 60th Troop Carrier Group (Note: This picture of the group's planes was taken after the wing was inactivated. National Archives: 60th Troop Carrier Group C-54 Skymasters during the Berlin Airlift, 1948.)
- Active: 1942–1948; 1954–1969; 2004–2010
- Country: United States
- Branch: United States Air Force
- Type: Wing
- Role: Airlift (1942-1948), Air defense warning and control (1954-1969) Development of air and ground electronic systems (2004-2010)
- Motto: Videre est Parari (Latin: "To See is to be Prepared")
- Engagements: Operation Husky; Operation Dragoon
- Decorations: Air Force Outstanding Unit Award

Insignia
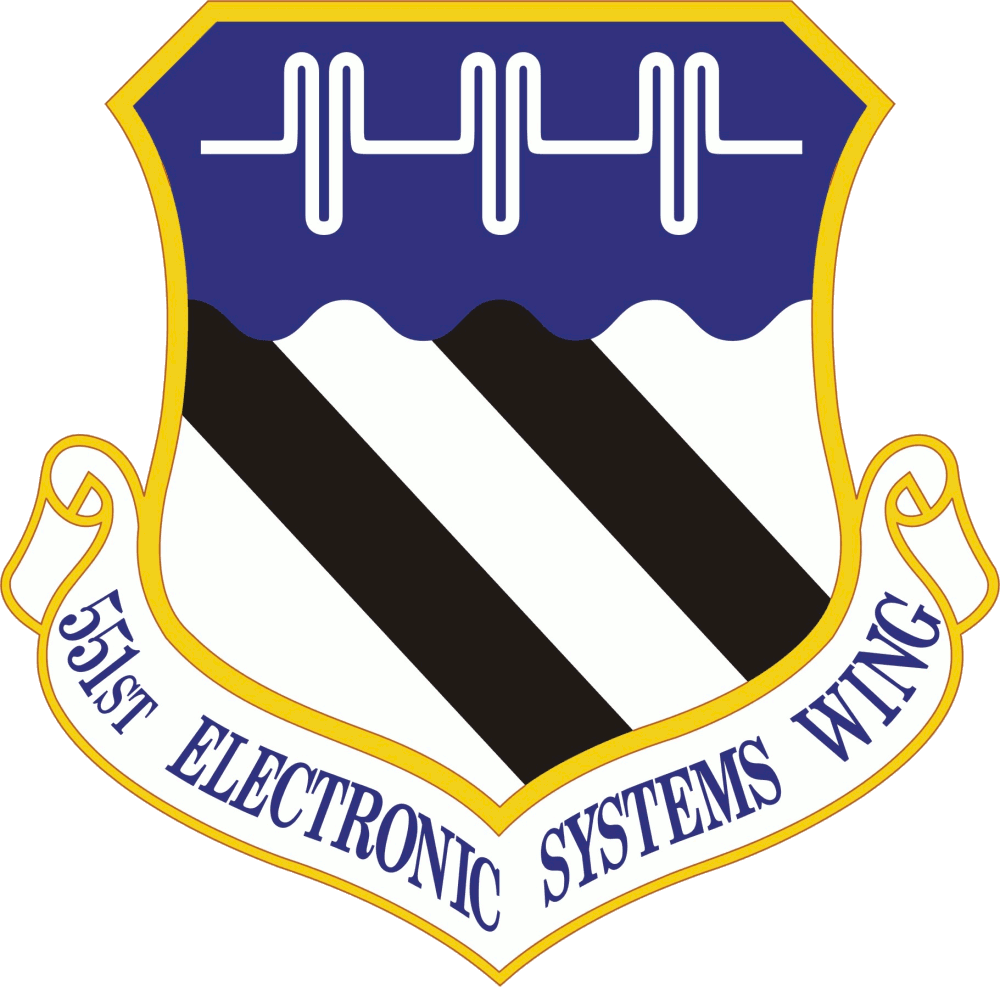
- 551st Electronic Systems Wing emblem

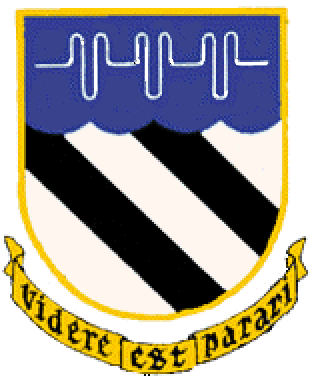
- 551 Airborne Early Warning & Control Wg emblem (Note: approved 22 December 1955. Ravenstein, pp. 285–286.)

The 51st Troop Carrier Wing is an inactive United States Air Force unit. The wing was formed during World War II and was the first troop carrier wing in the Army Air Forces (AAF) organized for deployment overseas. During the war, it served in the Mediterranean Theater of Operations, and its elements participated in every airborne assault in the theater. The wing also transported personnel and supplies within the theater. Its units also performed the majority of special operations flights by AAF units in the theater. Following V-E Day, the wing moved to Germany, where it became part of the occupation forces, operating as the European Air Transport Service until inactivating in January 1948. In August 1946, two of its planes were shot down by Yugoslav Air Force fighters near Yugoslavia's border with Austria and Italy.

In 1985, the wing was consolidated with the 551st Airborne Early Warning and Control Wing, which provided airborne surveillance off the eastern coast of the United States from December 1954 through December 1969. During the Cuban Missile Crisis, this wing's aircraft provided air defense warning and control between Florida and Cuba. The consolidated unit remained inactive until it was consolidated with the Battle Management Systems Wing in 2006, with the unit receiving its most recent name, the 551st Electronic Systems Wing, a few days afterward. From 2004 to 2010, it was responsible for development of battle management systems.

== History ==
=== World War II ===
==== Organization and deployment ====
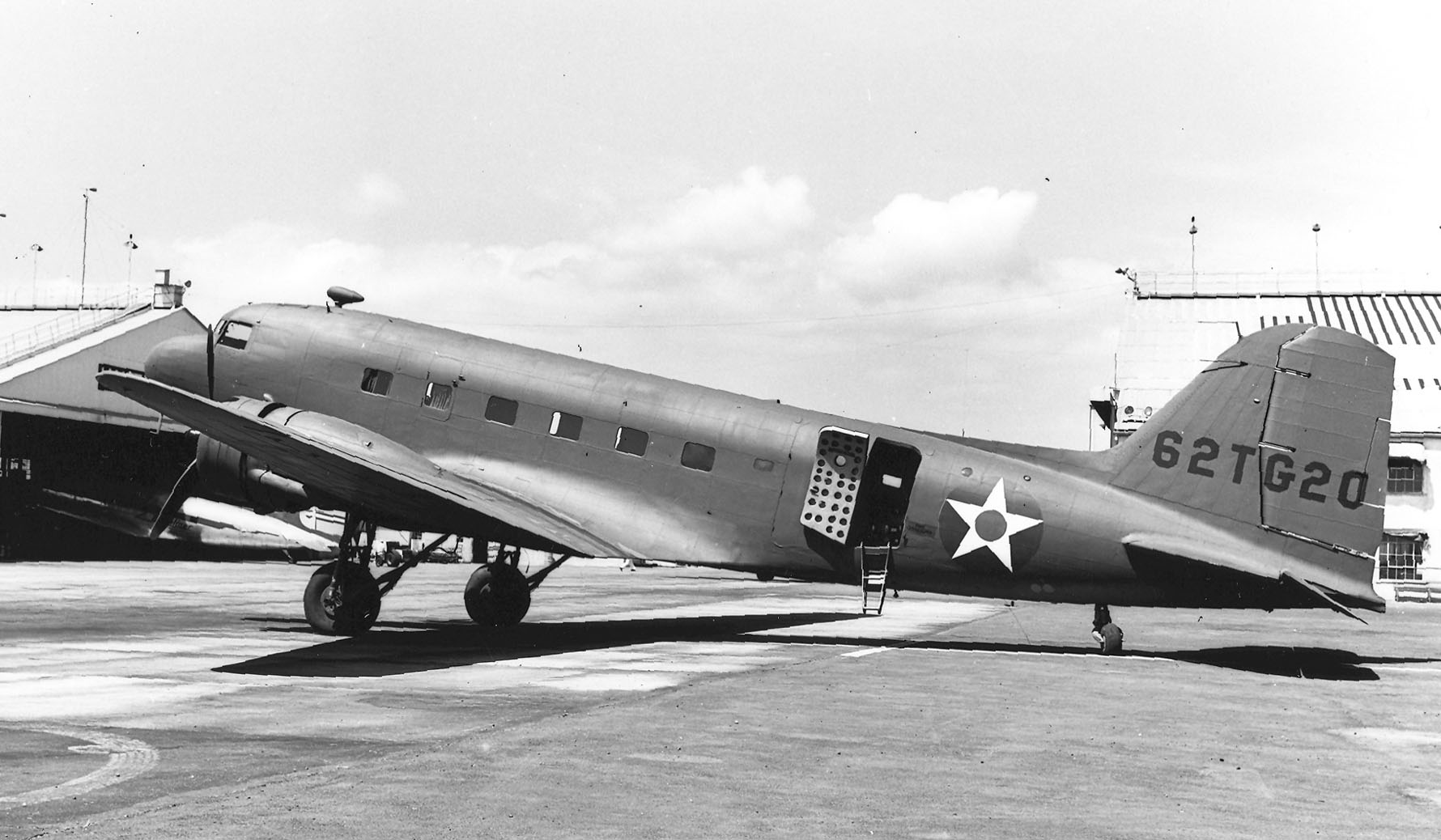
62d Group Douglas C-39 before deployment to Europe

The wing was activated on 1 June 1942 at Pope Field, North Carolina as the 51st Transport Wing, becoming the 51st Troop Carrier Wing a few weeks later. Its first elements were the 60th, 61st, 62d and 64th Transport Groups, flying Douglas C-47 Skytrains and C-53 Skytroopers. The wing was the first airlift wing in the Army Air Forces (AAF) expressly organized for service overseas, initially for support of Operation Bolero, the planned cross-Channel invasion of Europe. (Note: The 50th Transport Wing had been organized earlier, but at first it was primarily concerned with transporting depot materiel. By 1942, it had been decided that the 50th Wing would remain in the United States as a training headquarters. Warren, J., p. 3.) When the wing was activated, the 60th and 64th Groups were at Westover Field, Massachusetts, having already begun their deployment to Europe, while the 61st and 62d Groups were still stationed in the Carolinas, near wing headquarters.

The wing and its combat groups were all in England by the end of September 1942, where they initially became part of Eighth Air Force. The first elements to arrive, had been used to haul supplies between depots in the United Kingdom, but in the fall, 60th Group operations turned to training for airdropping paratroopers and preparing for Operation Torch, the invasion of French North Africa. In October, the wing became part of Twelfth Air Force, and the 60th, 62d and 64th Groups, which had been assigned to Twelfth Air Force on 14 September, were returned to its control.

==== North African Campaign ====
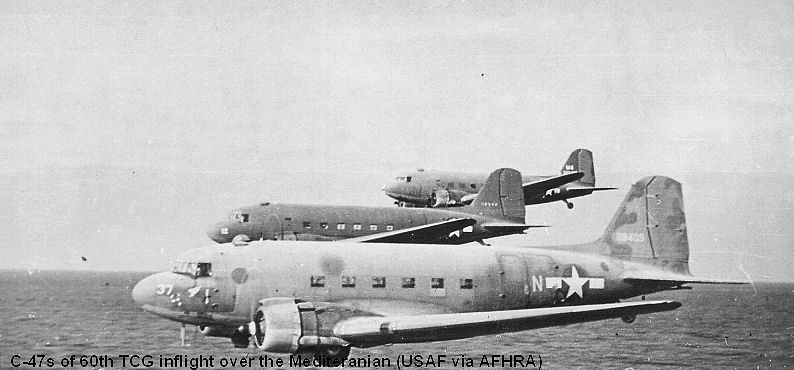
60th Group C-47s over the Mediterranean

It was critical for Operation Torch that the airfields near Oran, Algeria, Tafaraoui Airfield and La Senia Airfield, be seized immediately. The wing's most experienced group, the 60th, was tasked with transporting elements of the 503rd Parachute Infantry Regiment, flying across Spain, with plans to drop the paratroopers on Tafaraoui shortly after midnight if French resistance was expected, or to land them at La Senia early in the morning if a friendly reception was expected. In either case, the distance involved made this a one-way mission and the C-47s would have to land on the seized airfields. In the event, the force departed on 8 November 1942, expecting to land at La Senia, but was scattered while penetrating clouds associated with a weather front over Spain. Unexpected winds over southern Spain blew many aircraft off course. Navigational assistance expected toward the end of the 1,000 miles (2,000 km) mission evaporated. A British destroyer transmitted its navigational aid on the wrong frequency and a covert agent transmitting from a site near the airfields was not informed of the delay and destroyed his equipment when planes did not arrive after midnight. Planes were scattered over Morocco and Algeria, and this, the first combat drop of American paratroopers, occurred near Lourmel Airfield, not in the planned drop zone (DZ). The paratroopers proceeded to Tafaraoui by foot and by the time they and the wing's C-47s arrived there, other allied forces were approaching the field, so the airborne operation had little impact on the invasion of North Africa. Despite the expectation of a friendly reception, both fighter and antiaircraft artillery opposition was encountered, with several group planes forced to land, although none were lost to enemy action.

By 11 November, the available planes of the 60th Group, and some from the 64th Group, flew paratroopers to occupy Maison Blanche Airport, near Algiers. The 64th Group had been operating from Gibraltar with British paratroops from the 3rd Parachute Battalion. Two days later, the 60th Group was ordered to occupy Tebessa, near the Tunisian border. On 15 November, the same day the 62d Group arrived in Algeria, the wing's forces at Maison Blanche flew an "ad hoc" mission transporting 300 troops of the 503rd Regiment to Youks-les-Bains Airfield, 10 miles (16 km) from Tebessa, where they were successfully dropped. Wing headquarters was established at Tafaraoui on 14 November, so the entire wing was now operating in Algeria. (Note: The 64th Group headquarters did not formally arrive until mid-December, but it was operating in November. Maurer, pp. 130–131.) On 12 November, the 64th carried British paratroopers from Maison Blanche to seize Bône Airfield, to use as a base to take Bône, which provided the best port facilities in eastern Algeria.

The remainder of the British 1st Parachute Brigade had arrived in Algiers by water transport, and were tasked with taking Souk-el-Arba Airfield, which was located on a major junction on the main road to Tunis. The only map available for planning was a road map, and the DZ had to be selected by the paratroop commander, who rode in the cockpit of the lead plane of the 64th Group formation. After an aborted mission due to fog on 15 November, on 16 November 384 British paratroopers were dropped successfully and no planes were lost on this mission. By late November, Allied forces were approaching Tunis, and a plan was drawn up to drop airborne forces into Tunis, behind the German lines. Planners presumed that resistance would be light, with enemy forces deployed to meet troops advancing from Algeria. British paratroopers were to be dropped on Pont du Fahs Airfield. On 29 November, the day of the drop, intelligence indicated that Pont du Fahs and Depienne Airfields were unoccupied, and the decision was made to switch the drop to Depienne, which was about 10 miles (16 km) closer to Tunis that Pont du Fahs. A formation of planes from the wing's 62d and 64th Groups with over 500 paratroopers of the British 2nd Parachute Battalion and led by the 51st Wing commander flew the mission. The drop was successful, and no planes were lost, although the inexperienced 62d Group dropped paratroopers over a widely dispersed area. Unfortunately for the paratroopers, the Germans halted the First Army's advance and they were trapped 40 miles (64 km) behind German lines. Only half the battalion was able to fight their way back to friendly forces.

For the next four months, the Allies would be on the defensive and no major air assaults were planned. The long distances involved in the theater and primitive communications made air transport vital for logistics and communications, and the wing concentrated on missions in these areas. However, the demand for theater airlift was so great that the wing was unable to even temporarily withdraw any of its squadrons to maintain proficiency in dropping paratroops.

==== Invasion of Sicily ====
In January 1943, at the Casablanca Conference, the Allies determined that the next objective would be Sicily. (Note: Theater planners had also studied landings in Sardinia or even southern France. Warren, J., p. 20.) Detailed planning for what would be called Operation Husky began the following month. By April it was determined that both the American landings in the west and the British landings in the southeast of the island would be supported by airborne operations. By May, the 52d Troop Carrier Wing had arrived in the theater from the United States to reinforce the 51st. The 52d was tasked with dropping the American airborne forces, while the 51st and elements of the Royal Air Force's (RAF) No. 38 Wing would support the British paratroopers. The 64th Group was detached to the 52d Wing for the initial operation, but would return to the 51st Wing for followup drops. The 51st would tow Waco CG-4 (known as the Hadrian in British service) gliders with British troopers to a point near Syracuse. This operation was named Operation Ladbroke. The wing had not used gliders before, and when enough had arrived in Tunisia, it began training with them in June.

On the night of 9 July 1943, 137 planes launched for Sicily. Between 109 and 119 of the airplanes, with over 1,000 troopers in tow, released their gliders within sight of their objective, the Ponte Grande, south of Syracuse but only one in five troopers was able to reach the objective that night. Although searchlights and anti-aircraft fire did little damage to the wing's aircraft, they disrupted the release of the gliders to a point that only about 58 of the gliders were released near Syracuse, while 69 landed in the water. In addition, strong headwinds reduced the distance gliders were able to glide to reach their landing zones. All wing airplanes returned safely, but casualties in the landing force reached 60%, although they were able to keep the Germans from destroying the bridge before reinforcements arrived.

On 13 July, wing aircraft took off on Operation Fustian, intended to capture the Primasole Bridge over the Simeto River near Catania. Over 100 planes from the 60th and 62d Groups were joined by a handful that had returned to wing control from the 64th Group carrying 1,856 troops from the British 1st Parachute Brigade. Nineteen gliders towed by elements of No. 38 Wing would follow with vehicles and artillery. Although a course to Sicily was designed to avoid naval convoys, the planes, flying at 500 feet (150 m) came near several concentrations of Allied ships, and about half of them came under friendly fire en route. Although escorting destroyers had been briefed on the operation, troop transports and cargo ships had not, and took the low flying troop carriers for attacking German planes. Two planes were shot down and nine others were forced to turn back because of wounded crew or damage to the planes. Over the DZ, German fire accounted for an additional nine shot down while dropping their paratroopers, although four of these were able to make emergency landings off the coast. Overall, about 10% of the planes involved in the operation were lost. Only 39 planes were able to place their paratroopers within a mile of the briefed DZs, but ten planes of the 7th Troop Carrier Squadron dropped all their troops as briefed. Only four Airspeed Horsa gliders played an active role in the operation. Although the bridge was secured, a German counterattack drove the British away until reinforcements arrived on the 16th. In late August 1943, the wing moved its headquarters to Sicily, moving to Gela Airfield at the end of August.

==== Move to Italy ====
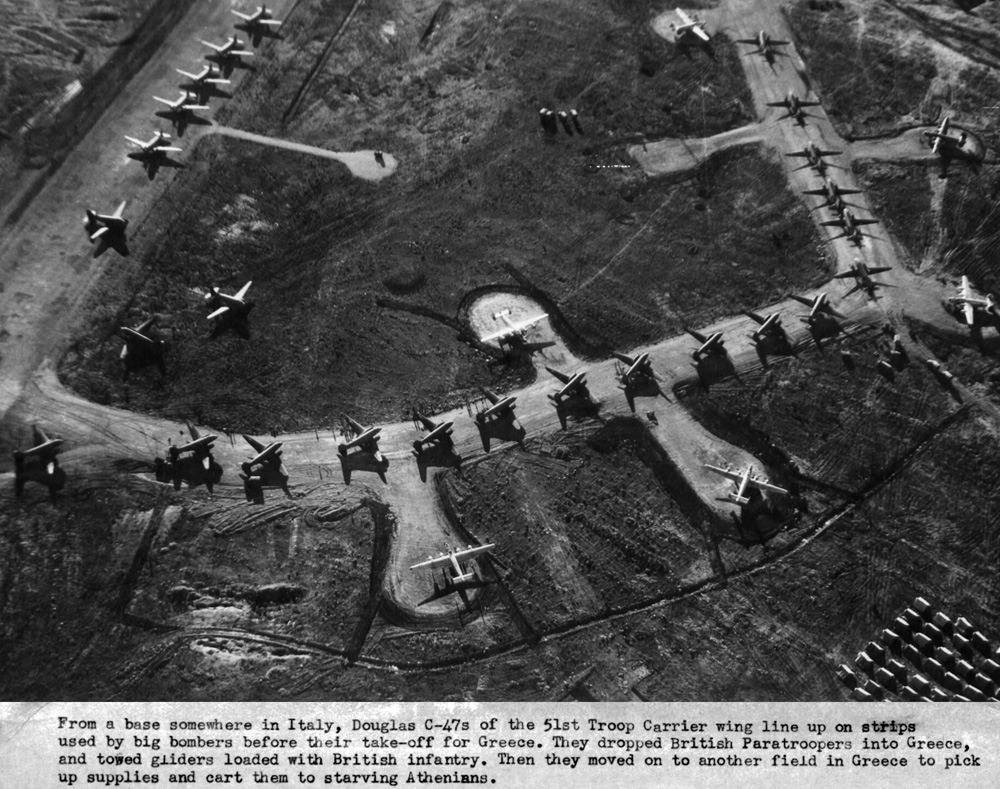
51st Troop Carrier Wing C-47s on a base in Italy

Although planning had gone forward for airborne operations to support Operation Avalanche, including one in which the wing operations officer engaged in a secret meeting with Italian government officials about a possible operation in Rome, the landings at Salerno went forward without immediate airborne support. However, on the night of 14 September 1943, the 51st Wing assembled a force of 40 planes for an attack on Avellino with 590 troopers from the 509th Regimental Combat Team. This was the first operation in which the wing used pathfinders (flown in a plane of the 35th Troop Carrier Squadron), to mark the DZ ahead of the main force. Heavy flak was encountered by the pathfinder near the front lines, but the only plane lost was shot down by a British night fighter. Despite the beacon set by the pathfinder, eight of the wing's planes made their drops more than 8 miles (13 km) from the planned DZ. This dispersal prevented any of the paratroops from reaching their objective, a bridge on the road to Montecorvino until 19 September.

In February 1944, the 52d Troop Carrier Wing moved to England to prepare for Operation Overlord, the invasion of Normandy. This made the existence of a separate troop carrier command superfluous, and XII Troop Carrier Command was discontinued, making the 51st once again the headquarters for American troop carrier units in the Mediterranean. During February, the functions of XII Troop Carrier Command were gradually transferred to the wing, including planning for Operation Anvil (later Operation Dragoon), the invasion of southern France. The greater part of the 64th Troop Carrier Group was sent to the China Burma India Theater in April, where its squadrons supported the offensive in Burma, operating from separate bases. This deployment lasted through June, when the detached squadrons returned to Sicily.

==== Operation Dragoon ====
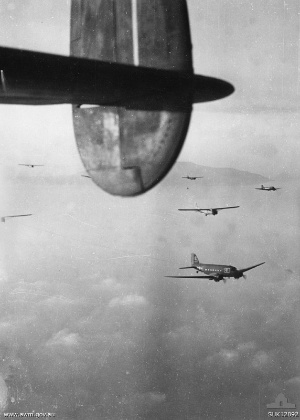
Gliders being towed in Operation Dragoon

In June 1944, the wing moved its headquarters from Sicily to Lido di Roma, on the Italian peninsula. The 60th and 62d Groups had preceded it, and with the move of the 64th Group in July, the wing was entirely located on the mainland. The glider detachments of the three groups were all concentrated at Marcigliana. To coordinate airborne assaults in connection with Operation Dragoon, an operational and planning staff arrived from IX Troop Carrier Command. This staff formed the Provisional Troop Carrier Air Division, although Twelfth Air Force referred to it as "IX Troop Carrier Command (Provisional)". In July, the 50th and 53d Troop Carrier Wings arrived in Italy along with twelve pathfinder planes to fill out the troop carrier task force. The wing's groups engaged in refresher training in airborne operations, having been dedicated to transportation of personnel and freight and aeromedical evacuation missions for nearly a year. The 62nd Group did so poorly on practice jumps that it was decided that a flight from the 435th Troop Carrier Group would lead their formation in the operation.

On 15 August, the 51st Wing dropped about 1700 paratroops near dawn. To identify the aircraft in the operation, the wing added invasion stripes to its aircraft to match the markings of the wings that had participated in the Normandy invasion. The operation went smoothly with no enemy opposition until approaching the coast, which was enveloped in fog. The use of pathfinders using Eureka beacons permitted the 62nd Group to drop paratroopers of the British 2nd Parachute Brigade through the fog and on the designated DZ. The first serial of the 64th Group had similar results and the fog began to clear as its second serial arrived, permitting visual identification of the DZ. However, other elements of the 64th Group did not fare as well, and the 5th (Scottish) Parachute Battalion was dropped some distance from its intended site. All planes returned safely, although there were some aircrew casualties from antiaircraft fire. In the afternoon, the wing returned, this time with gliders, carrying artillery, support troops and supplies. Glider releases were made visually, except for the 64th Group, which relied on Eureka due to smoke in the area of the landing zone. However, the Germans had erected defenses, including poles, wires and mines on the designated landing ground, forcing the gliders to scatter to land where they could. The wing flew additional drops of emergency supplies on 17 August.

==== Special operations ====
The wing's troop carrier squadrons carried most of the burden of special operations for the AAF in the Mediterranean, starting in December 1943. The 8th Troop Carrier Squadron began flying missions behind enemy lines in Italy, infiltrating personnel and dropping supplies to isolated British units, flying its first mission the night of 8/9 December. Bad weather limited its operations through February 1944, although it did fly practice missions with members of the British Special Air Service. In February 1944, the 7th and 51st Troop Carrier Squadrons of the 62d Group began operations in the Balkans under control of No. 334 (Special Duties) Wing of the RAF. In March, the 60th Group replaced the 62d as the element of the wing performing special operations. The 7th and 51st Squadrons returned to special operations and formed the Balkan Detachment of the 62d Group. Operational control of wing elements involved in special operations was transferred to Balkan Air Force (BAF), which was formed in June 1944. BAF included fighter units that could provide escort in Yugoslavia, permitting some daytime landing missions, increasing the supplies provided to the Yugoslav National Liberation Army. The 60th Group flew the first mission to an airfield held by Partisans on the night of 2/3 April 1944. By the end of the war, 51st Wing planes had completed 846 landing missions in Yugoslavia.

Wing C-47s engaged in special operations were equipped with Rebecca equipment to receive signals from Eureka transmitters, but otherwise few modifications were required. Other than practice missions to develop skills in drops at low altitude and airspeed, little specialized training was required of C-47 crews. The number of planes dispatched varied with aircraft availability and weather, but an average of 35 missions was flown daily. A single mission averaged drops on 15 different targets. Supplies typically included guns and ammunition, demolition materials, clothing, food and medical supplies. All of Albania, most of Yugoslavia and Greece, and parts of Bulgaria were well within the range of the wing's C-47s. Weather proved to be a greater obstacle than enemy fighters or flak, accounting for more than half of unsuccessful sorties. (Note: Data on "C-47" sorties includes missions flown by RAF, South African Air Force and, between July and late November 1944, by a Soviet squadron stationed at Bari, Italy. Warren, H., pp. 30–33, 58.) The peak number of missions to Yugoslavia was during the period from April to October 1944, when the 60th Group was tasked with most missions. The increase in Yugoslav missions was, however, accompanied by a reduction in the number of missions flown to Greece. Support for Bulgarian forces was even lower, with 51st Wing aircraft flying a total of 68 sorties there, with a loss of one plane.

In October 1944, Soviet advances in the Balkans placed the German garrison in Greece in a position that it would have to withdraw or surrender. The 51st was tasked with dropping elements of the British 2nd Parachute Brigade in coordination with the Balkan Air Force in Operation Manna. On 12 October, planes from the 10th Troop Carrier Squadron dropped a company of British paratroops on Megara Airfield. Over the next six days, the wing flew over 200 sorties to Megara and Kalamaki Airfields from bases in Italy, delivering more than 2000 troops and more than 300 tons of supplies, mostly by parachute or glider. In December, the 7th Squadron began concentrating on operations in northern Italy, joined by squadrons of the 60th Group until January 1945, when they were relieved by the 64th Group. By May, the 64th had completed over 1000 sorties to northern Italy. Meanwhile, the 51st Squadron concentrated on missions to Albania. Responsibilities changed early in 1945, with 51st Wing units, except for the 51st Squadron, concentrating on aiding partisan activity in northern Italy, while the 15th Special Group (Provisional) assumed responsibility for Balkan missions.

=== End of hostilities and occupation of Germany ===
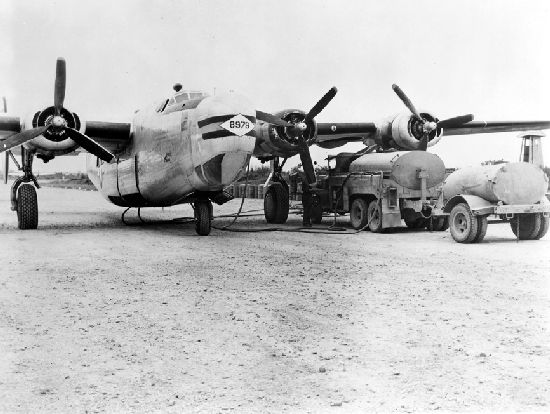
C-109 Liberator Express unloading

Shortly after the end of hostilities, on 25 May 1945, the wing's 60th and 64th Groups were reassigned to Air Transport Command and moved to the Caribbean to participate in the Green Project, the movement of American troops back to the United States. The wing's last operational element, the 62d Troop Carrier Group, was transferred to Mediterranean Air Transport Service in June.

The wing moved to Wiesbaden-Erbenheim Air Base, Germany at the end of August 1945, where it became part of the occupation forces. Shortly thereafter, on 4 September, the 302d Transport Wing was attached to the wing, and the 302d's flying groups were assigned to the 51st. The 302d carried cargo and passengers within Great Britain and to and from continental Europe. Its passengers included war correspondents, entertainers, general officers, enlisted personnel, pilots, German prisoners, Allied ex prisoners of war, and wounded personnel. It also ferried aircraft within the European Theater of Operations. In October, the 27th Air Transport Group was returned to the 302d Wing's control, and remained so until the 302d Wing was inactivated in December 1945. The 31st Transport Group became the 516th Troop Carrier Group, and, along with the other three troop carrier groups assigned to the wing, operated under the 51st Wing as the European Air Transport Service (Provisional) (EATS). These additions to the 51st added Curtiss C-46 Commandos and Consolidated C-109 Liberator Express aircraft to the wing's inventory for a short time. The wing also operated air terminal facilities at a number of airports in Europe, including Orly Airport in Paris and Tempelhof Airport in Berlin. The wing also maintained stations in England, Italy, Greece, Morocco, Libya and Saudi Arabia.

On 9 August 1946, an EATS C-47 Flying from Vienna, Austria to Udine, Italy was forced down by Yugoslav Air Force fighters near Ljubljana. The plane was circling near Ljubljana, when Yugoslav fighters directed it to land. The American pilot indicated he had become lost in bad weather over the Alps and believed the fighters were British until they began firing to force him down to a crash landing. While negotiations were underway for release of the plane's interned crew and passengers, a second EATS C-47 was shot down under similar circumstances, with its wreckage located two miles inside Yugoslavia, near Klagenfurt, Austria. The internees from the first incident were returned, but all aboard the second plane were killed.

The EATS was reduced in size when the 314th Troop Carrier Group, at Villacoublay Airfield, France returned to the United States on 15 February 1946. The service's remaining subordinate units were replaced on 30 September 1946, when the 61st Troop Carrier Group was activated at Eschborn Air Base, Germany to replace the 441st Troop Carrier Group and the 60th Troop Carrier Group replaced the 442d Troop Carrier Group at Munich Air Base, Germany, while the 313th Troop Carrier Group replaced the 516th Troop Carrier Group at Tulln Air Base, Austria. However, by September 1947, the 313th had transferred its personnel and aircraft to other units and was returned to the United States as a "paper" unit.

The wing's two remaining groups, the 60th and 61st, were transferred directly to United States Air Forces in Europe on 20 December 1947, when EATS was discontinued. The 51st was inactivated in Germany in January 1948, ironically, this was only five months before the expansion of USAFE's airlift forces required for the Berlin Airlift. The wing was disbanded in June 1983, but was reconstituted two years later and consolidated with the 551st Wing.

=== Airborne warning and control ===
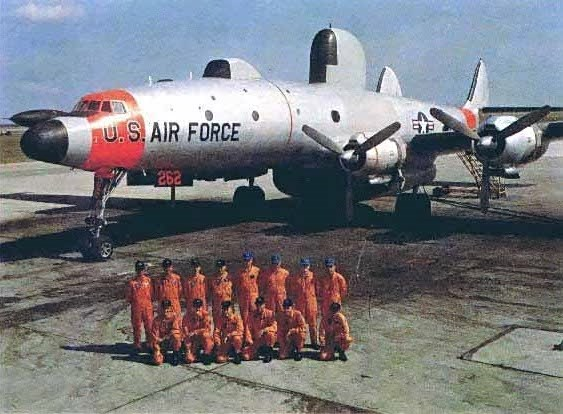
Wing crew and EC-121H Warning Star (Note: Aircraft is Lockheed EC-121H-LO Warning Star, serial 55-5262 (formerly US Navy Bureau Number 141289) at Otis Air Force Base. This aircraft crashed off the island of Nantucket, Massachusetts on 11 November 1966, 40 minutes after takeoff from Otis AFB due to engine problems, killing all nineteen crewmembers aboard. Banner, Earl (1966). "Fatal Plane Off Radar 7 Minutes; Probers Baffled". The Boston Globe.)

The 551st Airborne Early Warning and Control Wing was activated at Otis Air Force Base, Massachusetts in December 1954. The wing was assigned to the 8th Air Division, which had been formed earlier that year at McClellan Air Force Base, California to oversee the build up of Air Defense Command (ADC)'s airborne early warning and control force. The wing was charged with tracking air and sea activity along the United States eastern seaboard.

The 961st Airborne Early Warning and Control Squadron was activated along with the wing, although the wing did not receive its first mission asset until 2 March 1955, when the first Lockheed RC-121D Warning Star landed at Otis. By July, the wing had added two other squadrons, the 960th and 962d Airborne Early Warning and Control Squadrons. In August 1957, the wing took over host management of Otis from the 33rd Fighter Wing.

In late 1961, The wing began to deploy crews to McCoy Air Force Base, Florida. This operation expanded to become the wing's fourth operational squadron, the 966th Airborne Early Warning and Control Squadron, in January 1962. The squadron supported the National Aeronautics and Space Administration to "chase" rocket boosters as they fell back into the ocean after they separated from the rockets being shot into space. It also flew active air defense missions to monitor Cuban aircraft off the Florida Keys. The squadron also flew Operation Gold Digger missions, monitoring and tracking Lockheed U-2s flying photographic reconnaissance missions over Cuba. Four of the squadron's EC-121Ds were converted to EC-121Qs by replacing the AN/APS-45 radar with an AN/APS-103 with increased range.

Prior to the beginning of the Cuban Missile Crisis, the wing maintained one plane on station off the Florida coast. On 20 October 1962, six additional warning aircraft were deployed to McCoy, and two days later a second station was added. Offshore warning forces were augmented by four United States Navy destroyers south of Key West and Grumman WF Tracer aircraft from VAW-12. This status was maintained until 3 December, when Montgomery Air Defense Sector, which had been managing air defense in the Gulf of Mexico, released the augmenting aircraft and returned to normal DEFCON 5.

The 966th Squadron was transferred to the 552d Airborne Early Warning and Control Wing in May 1963. This reassignment was because the rest of the wing had begun to replace its EC-121Ds (Note: The implementation of the 1962 United States Tri-Service aircraft designation system resulted in the RC-121Ds becoming EC-121Ds. "Designating and Naming Defense Military Aerospace Vehicles" (PDF). Departments of the Air Force, Navy and Army. 14 March 2005.) with Lockheed EC-121H Warning Stars in 1963. The D models relied on voice and manual teletype data relay systems to transmit information to command centers. The H models were equipped with data link systems compatible with the Semi-Automatic Ground Environment (SAGE) and could instantly transmit air defense surveillance and early-warning information to ADC command and control computers and the North American Air Defense Command Combat Operations Center in the Cheyenne Mountain Complex in Colorado, for evaluation and action. Because the Montgomery Air Defense Sector lacked SAGE equipment, there was no need to make this upgrade to the airplanes at McCoy.

Three EC-121Hs from the wing were lost—on 11 July 1965, 11 November 1966 and 25 April 1967—resulting in a total of 50 deaths (16, 19, and 15, respectively), including wing commander Col James P. Lyle in the 1967 crash.

In its first 10 years, the wing flew continuous missions over the Atlantic Ocean 24 hours a day, seven days a week, compiling more than 350,000 flying hours. The 551st deployed aircraft to Keflavik Air Base to provide surveillance of Soviet aircraft and naval vessels off Iceland. The wing also provided surveillance over Johnston Atoll and Christmas Island during nuclear testing by the Atomic Energy Commission. The 966th Squadron briefly returned to the wing's control in 1969. Along with this return came a commitment to augment Operation College Eye in Southeast Asia. The wing was inactivated on 31 December 1969. It was consolidated with the 51st Wing in 1985, but remained inactive.

=== Electronic systems development ===
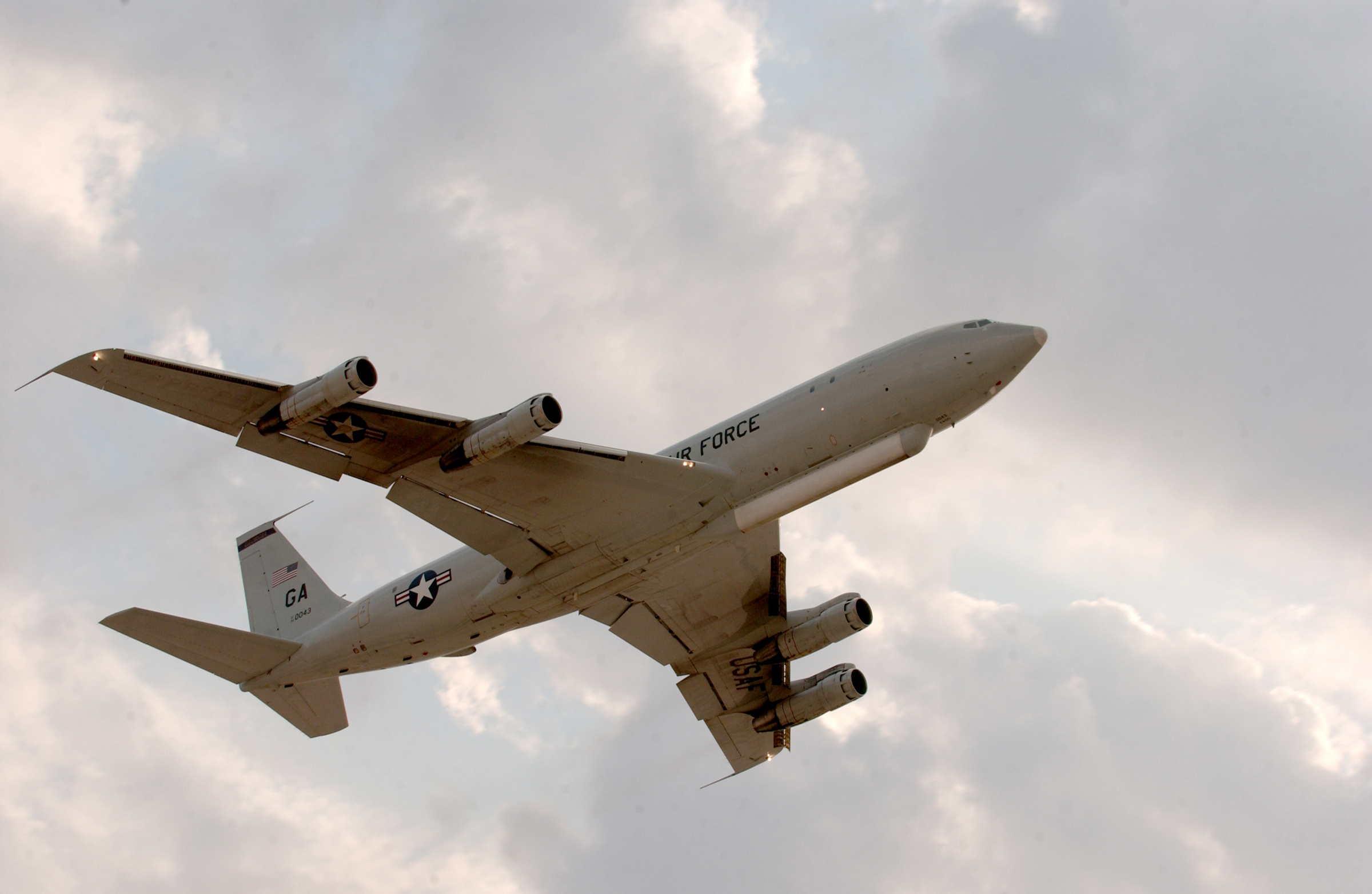
An E-8 Joint STARS aircraft on a flight testing sensors (Note: The test was conducted by a team including engineers from the wing's 751st Electronic Systems Group and from Northrop Grumman. "Joint STARS integration program". United States Air Force Public Affairs.)

Prior to 2005, Program Executive Officers (PEO)s managing Air Force systems were generally located in Washington. Program managers in field units reported to the PEO for each program. As a result of a study begun in 2003 the Air Force decided to consolidate PEOs and locate them at the Air Force Materiel Command (AFMC) centers. The reorganization was known as the Air Force Materiel Command Transformation. In conjunction with the new organization, the traditional center directorates were replaced by wings and groups. As a result, the Battle Management Systems Wing was activated at Hanscom Air Force Base Massachusetts in December 2004, replacing several offices in the Electronic Systems Center. The wing was responsible for development and fielding of airborne battle management command, control and communications systems in support of combatant commanders, special operations forces and worldwide allies. While acquiring and fielding ground based weather collecting and forecasting systems and systems delivering environmental information to Air Force and Army commanders were retained in the wing headquarters' Weather Systems Division four subordinate groups were organized for other systems.

The E-3 Airborne Warning & Control Systems/Airborne Early Warning & Control Systems Group was responsible for modernization and sustainment of Boeing E-3 Sentry aircraft and airborne early warning and control, including surveillance radar, navigation, communications, data processing, identification and display equipment and capabilities.

The E-8 Joint Surveillance Target Attack Radar System Systems Group was responsible for all aspects of the development, acquisition and sustainment of the Joint STARS system. The Boeing E-8C Joint STARS is a Command control and intelligence, surveillance, and reconnaissance platform that provides ground moving target indicator battlefield surveillance and synthetic aperture radar imagery to support attack operations and targeting while also conducting ground and maritime surveillance.

The E-10 Multiplatform Radar Technical Insertion Program Systems Group was responsible for developing, acquiring, testing, demonstrating the $1.5 billion Multi-Platform Radar Technology Insertion Program, which was intended to replace several other earlier systems. The program developed modular, scalable, surveillance and reconnaissance radars to be installed on Northrop Grumman RQ-4B Global Hawk and Northrop Grumman E-10 aircraft.

The Mission Planning Systems Group, developed and supported three systems. Two legacy systems, included Unix based Mission Planning System and the PC based Portable Flight Planning System. The third was the developing PC-based planner, Joint Mission Planning System with major integration expectations.

The wing was redesignated on 17 April 2006, becoming the 551st Electronic Systems Wing after consolidating with the 551st Wing a few days previously, while its subordinate groups also received numbers. After analyzing the results of its 2004 reorganization, the Air Force decided PEOs that were even closer to the persons managing programs on a day-to-day basis would improve the system. It announced the Air Force Acquisition Improvement Plan in May 2009 and four months later announced the initiative would include a return to the Directorate organizational model. The wing and its groups were inactivated on 30 June 2010.

== Lineage ==
51st Troop Carrier Wing

- Established as the 51st Transport Wing on 30 May 1942

Activated on 1 June 1942
Redesignated 51st Troop Carrier Wing on 4 July 1942
Inactivated on 5 January 1948

- Disestablished on 15 June 1983

Reestablished on 31 July 1985 and consolidated with the 551st Airborne Early Warning and Control Wing as the 551st Airborne Warning and Control Wing on 31 July 1985

551st Airborne Warning and Control Wing

- Established as the 551st Airborne Early Warning and Control Wing on 11 October 1954

Activated on 18 December 1954
Inactivated on 31 December 1969
Consolidated with the 51st Troop Carrier Wing as the 551st Airborne Warning and Control Wing on 31 July 1985 (remained inactive)
Consolidated with the Battle Management Systems Wing on 6 April 2006

551st Electronic Systems Wing
Established as the Battle Management Systems Wing on 23 November 2004
Activated on 17 December 2004
Consolidated with the 551st Airborne Warning and Control Wing on 6 April 2006
Redesignated 551st Electronic Systems Wing on 17 April 2006
Inactivated on 30 June 2010

=== Assignments ===
- Air Transport Command (later I Troop Carrier Command), 1 June 1942
- Eighth Air Force, c. 18 August 1942
- Twelfth Air Force, 20 October 1942
- XII Air Force Service Command, 5 January 1943 (attached to Northwest African Troop Carrier Command (Provisional) (later XII Troop Carrier Command (Provisional)) 21 March 1943 – 19 February 1944; Provisional Troop Carrier Air Division (also known as IX Troop Carrier Command (Provisional)), 16 July – c. 25 August 1944)
- Air Service Command, Mediterranean Theater of Operations, 15 August 1945
- United States Air Forces in Europe, 31 August 1945 – 5 January 1948
- 8th Air Division, 18 December 1954
- Eastern Air Defense Force, 1 July 1957
- 26th Air Division, 1 July 1959
- First Air Force, 1 April 1966
- 21st Air Division; 4–31 December 1969
- Electronic Systems Center, 17 December 2004 – 30 June 2010

=== Components ===
==== Wing ====
- 302d Transport Wing: (attached 4 September – c. 9 December 1945)

==== Groups ====
- 27th Air Transport Group: 4 September – 15 October 1945
- 31st Transport Group (later 516th Troop Carrier Group): 4 September 1945 – 30 September 1946
- 33d Air Base Group: (attached 1 July – 18 August 1957)
- 33d Maintenance & Supply Group: (attached 1 July – 18 August 1957)
- 60th Transport Group (later 60th Troop Carrier Group): 1 June – 14 September 1942, 20 October 1942 – 25 May 1945 (detached 22 March – 20 April 1943 and 1 April – 5 October 1944), 30 September 1946 – 20 Dec 1947
- 61st Transport Group (later 61st Troop Carrier Group): 1 June – 6 August 1942, 30 September 1946 – 20 December 1947
- 62d Transport Group (later 62d Troop Carrier Group): 1 June – 14 September 1942; 20 October 1942 – 4 June 1945
- 64th Transport Group (later 64th Troop Carrier Group): 1 June – 14 September 1942, 20 October 1942 – 25 May 1945 (detached 20 April – c. 20 May 1943; Attached to 52d Troop Carrier Wing, 15 June – 11 July 1943, Tenth Air Force c. 7 April – 15 June 1944)
- 313th Troop Carrier Group: 30 September 1946 – 25 June 1947
- 314th Troop Carrier Group: 4 September 1945 – 15 February 1946
- 441st Troop Carrier Group: 4 September 1945 – 30 September 1946
- 442d Troop Carrier Group: 4 September 1945 – 30 September 1946
- 473d Air Service Gp; 4 September 1945 – c. 15 September 1947
- 551st Air Base Group (later 551st Combat Support Group): 18 August 1957 – 1 November 1969
- 551st Maintenance & Supply Group: 18 August 1957 – 8 November 1958
- E-3 Airborne Warning & Control Systems/Airborne Early Warning & Control Systems Group (later 551st Electronic Systems Group): 17 December 2004 – 30 June 2010
- E-8 Joint Surveillance Target Attack Radar System Systems Group (later 751st Electronic Systems Group): 17 December 2004 – 30 June 2010
- E-10 Multiplatform Radar Technical Insertion Program Systems Group (later 851st Electronic Systems Group): 17 December 2004 – 30 June 2010
- Mission Planning Systems Group (later 951st Electronic Systems Group): 17 December 2004 – 30 June 2010

==== Squadrons ====
Operational squadrons

- 158th Liaison Squadron: 25 September 1945 – 15 February 1946
- 960th Airborne Early Warning and Control Squadron: 8 March 1955 – 31 July 1969
- 961st Airborne Early Warning and Control Squadron: 18 December 1954 – 31 December 1969
- 962d Airborne Early Warning and Control Squadron: 8 July 1955 – 31 December 1969
- 966th Airborne Early Warning and Control Squadron: 1 February 1962 – 1 May 1963; 1 July – 15 November 1969
- 4753d Air Defense Squadron: 22 April 1968 – 31 December 1969

Maintenance squadrons

- 2d Mobile Reclamation and Repair Squadron: c. 9 October 1945 – November 1945
- 551st Electronics Maintenance Squadron (later 551st Avionics Maintenance Squadron): 18 December 1954 – 1 July 1957, 8 November 1958 – 31 December 1969
- 551st Field Maintenance Squadron: 8 November 1958 – 31 December 1969
- 551st Periodic Maintenance Squadron (later 551st Organizational Maintenance Squadron): 18 December 1954 – 1 July 1957, 8 November 1958 – 31 December 1969

==== Other ====
- European Air Transport Service (Provisional); 4 September 1945 – 20 December 1947
- 33d USAF Hospital: (attached 1 July – 18 August 1957)
- 551st USAF Hospital: 18 August 1957 – 31 December 1969
- 217th Medical Dispensary: unknown during World War II
- 47th Station Complement Squadron: unknown during World War II
- 302d Signal Company (later 22d Communications Squadron): February 1944 – 20 December 1947
- 2010th Labor Supervision Company: 1 July 1947 – unknown

=== Stations ===
- Pope Field, North Carolina, 1 June – 19 July 1942
- RAF Greenham Common, England, c. 4 September 1942
- Tafaraoui Airfield, Algeria, 14 November 1942
- Algiers, Algeria, 23 November 1942
- La Senia Airfield, Algeria, 28 March 1943
- Mascara Airfield, Algeria, 13 May 1943
- Goubrine Airfield, Tunisia, 24 June 1943
- Gela Airfield, Sicily, 29 August 1943
- Catania Airfield, Sicily, 29 September 1943
- Lido di Roma, Italy, 29 June 1944
- Siena, Italy, 8 January 1945
- Wiesbaden-Erbenheim Air Base, Germany, 30 August 1945 – 5 January 1948
- Otis Air Force Base, Massachusetts, 18 December 1954 – 31 December 1969
- Hanscom Air Force Base Massachusetts, 17 December 2004 – 30 June 2010

=== Aircraft ===
- Douglas C-47 Skytrain, 1942–1947
- Douglas C-53 Skytrooper, 1942–1946
- Waco CG-4 gliders, 1943–1944
- Curtiss C-46 Commando, 1945–1946
- Consolidated C-109 Liberator Express, 1945–1946
- Douglas C-54 Skymaster, 1946–1947
- Lockheed C-121 Constellation, 1955–1969
- Lockheed RC-121D (later EC-121D) Warning Star, 1955–1962
- Lockheed EC-121Q Warning Star, 1962–1963, 1969
- Lockheed EC-121H Warning Star, 1963–1969

=== Awards and campaigns ===
Award streamer	Award	Dates	Notes
	Air Force Outstanding Unit Award	1 July 1957 – 31 October 1958	551st Airborne Early Warning & Control Wing
	Air Force Outstanding Unit Award	1 July 1961 – 30 June 1963	551st Airborne Early Warning & Control Wing
	Air Force Outstanding Unit Award	15 April 1965 – 1 July 1966	551st Airborne Early Warning & Control Wing

Campaign Streamer	Campaign	Dates	Notes
	Tunisia	12 November 1942 – 13 May 1943	51st Troop Carrier Wing
	Sicily	14 May 1943 – 17 August 1943	51st Troop Carrier Wing
	Naples-Foggia	18 August 1943 – 21 January 1944	51st Troop Carrier Wing
	Rome-Arno	22 January 1944 – 9 September 1944	51st Troop Carrier Wing
	North Apennines	10 September 1944 – 4 April 1945	51st Troop Carrier Wing
	Po Valley	3 April 1945 – 8 May 1945	51st Troop Carrier Wing
	World War II Army of Occupation (Germany)	30 August 1945 – 5 January 1948	51st Troop Carrier Wing
