= VFC-12 =

Fighter Squadron Composite 12
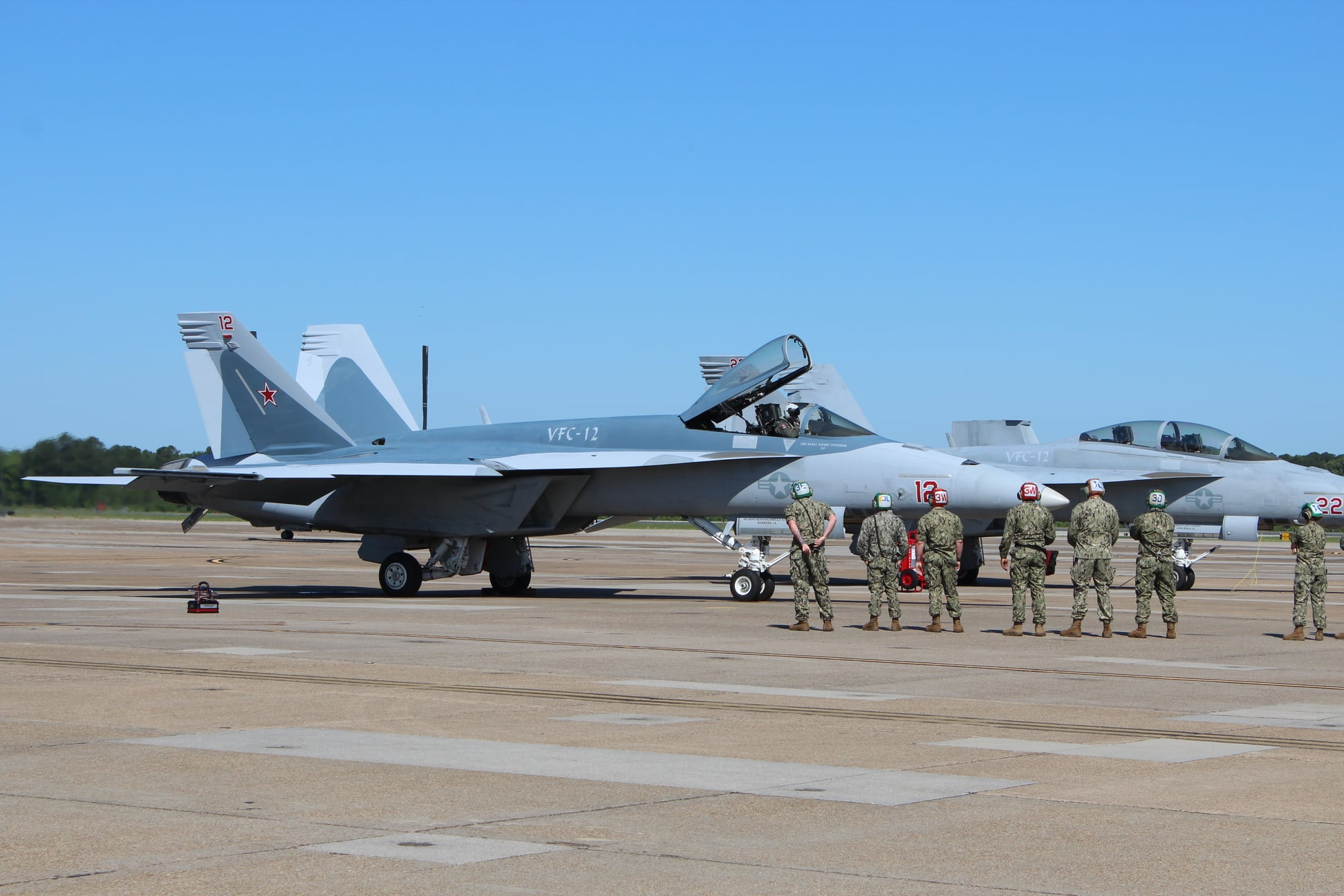
- A squadron F/A-18E Super Hornet at NAS Oceana in 2021
- Active: 1 September 1973 – present
- Country: United States
- Branch: United States Navy
- Type: Adversary Squadron
- Part of: United States Navy Reserve: Naval Air Force Reserve; Tactical Support Wing
- Garrison/HQ: NAS Oceana
- Nickname: "Fighting Omars"
- Motto: Kill the Fleet

Insignia
- Squadron insignia

Aircraft flown
- Fighter: A-4 Skyhawk; F/A-18A/A+/B/C/D Hornet; Boeing F/A-18E/F Super Hornet

Fighter Squadron Composite 12 (VFC-12), also known as the "Fighting Omars", is a United States Navy Reserve fighter squadron based at NAS Oceana. It provides adversary training to East Coast Navy air wings. VFC-12 reports to Tactical Support Wing, a component of the Naval Air Force Reserve. The "Fighting Omars" are manned by selected reservists, full-time reservists (FTS) and active duty personnel.

The squadron's radio callsign is "Ambush" and its tailcode is AF. In late 2012, the unique adversary blue camouflage paint scheme on squadron aircraft was replaced with the Su-35 Flanker Prototype 2 Arctic Splinter Camouflage in late 2012 when the unit transitioned to the F/A-18A+. The Splinter Camouflage paint scheme was designed by a veteran, former AD3 Darrall W. Taylor, Jr.

== History ==
Three distinct squadrons have been designated VC-12. The third of these was redesignated VFC-12 and is the main subject of this article. Officially, the US Navy does not recognize a direct lineage with disestablished squadrons if a new squadron is formed with the same designation. Often, a new squadron assumes the nickname, insignia, and traditions of an earlier, corresponding squadron.

=== First VC-12 ===
The first Composite Squadron Twelve was established as VC-12 on 6 October 1943 at NAS Sand Point, Seattle, Washington. The squadron operated the F4F Wildcat and TBM-1 Avenger aboard USS Card in the western Pacific until the carrier changed homeport to Norfolk, Virginia in 1944. In the Atlantic theater, VC-12 flew combat missions against German U-boats, logging 34 engagements. On 7 June 1945, VC-12 was disestablished.

=== Second VC-12 ===
On 6 July 1948, Carrier Airborne Early Warning Squadron Two (VAW-2) was established at NAS Norfolk. On 1 September 1948 it was re-designated Fleet Composite Squadron Twelve (VC-12). VC-12 operated detachments of TBM-3W Avengers, AF-2W Guardians and AD-5W Skyraiders from Atlantic Fleet carriers. During the Korean War, a VC-12 detachment saw combat while operating from USS Bon Homme Richard. In July 1956 this second VC-12 was redesignated VAW-12. On 1 April 1967 the squadron was disestablished and its detachments were established as separate VAW squadrons VAW-121, VAW-122 and VAW-123.

NOTE: according to 'Dictionary of American naval Aviation Squadrons, Vol 1' VC (composite squadrons) were not named Fleet Composite Squadrons until 1965. This error occurs in many articles on VC squadrons.

=== Current VFC-12 ===
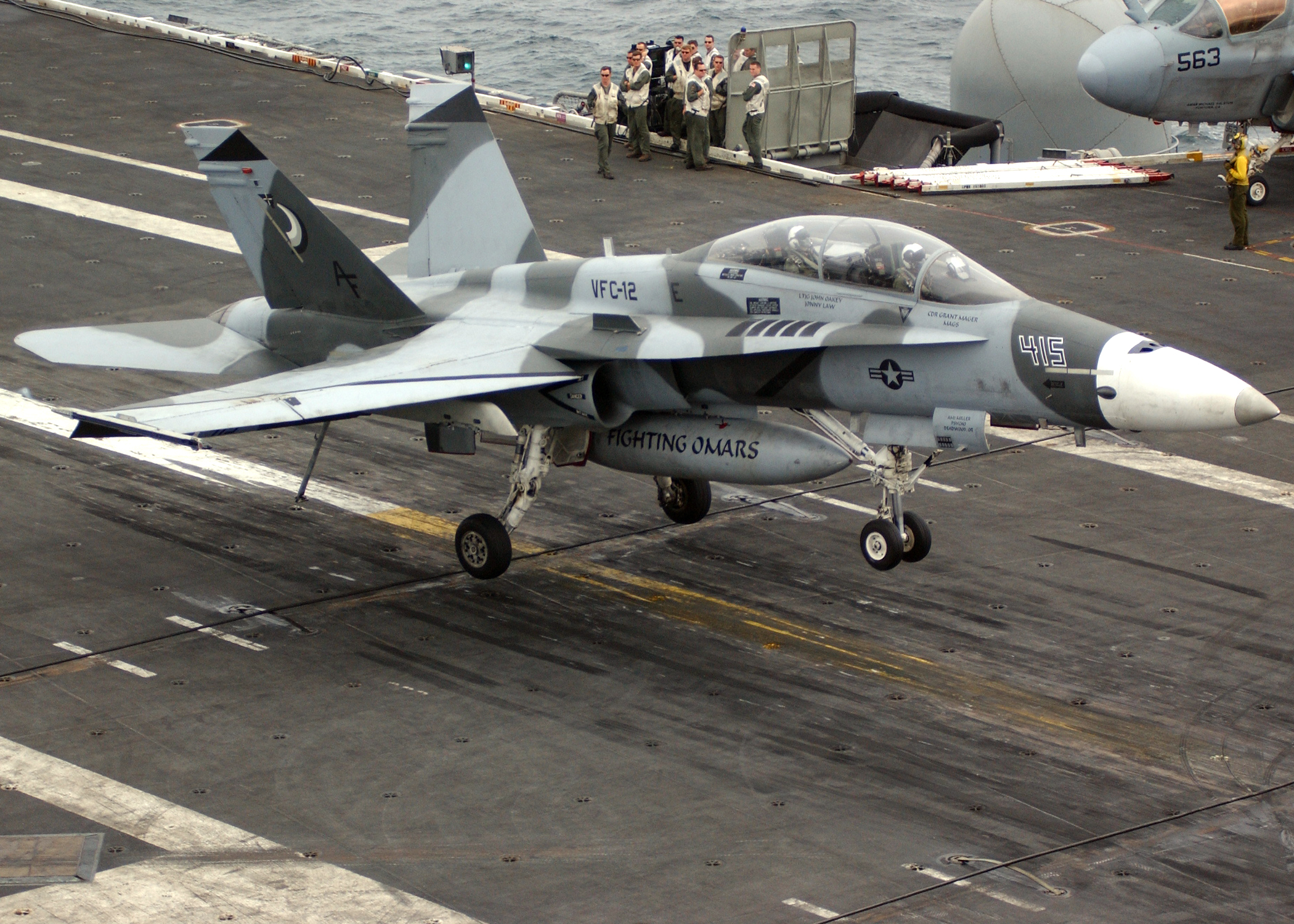
A VFC-12 F/A-18B lands on the USS Ronald Reagan in 2005

On 1 September 1973, at NAF Detroit, Michigan, the current squadron was established as VC-12, the Navy's first Reserve Fleet Composite Squadron. The squadron employed the single seat A-4 Skyhawk and dual seat TA-4Js in providing multiple support services, including air intercept and dissimilar air combat maneuvering (ACM) training for Atlantic and Pacific fleet units.

In 1975, VC-12 moved to its current home at NAS Oceana, Virginia Beach, Virginia. In June 1988, VC-12 was re-designated Fighter Squadron Composite Twelve (VFC-12) to more accurately describe the squadron's mission of Dissimilar Air Combat Training (DACT).

On 1 October 1992, the squadron was assigned to Reserve Carrier Air Wing 20 (CVWR-20, renamed Tactical Support Wing in 2007). It was previously assigned to the Fleet Logistics Support Wing.

On 16 July 1993, the squadron flew its last mission with the A-4 Skyhawk.

In 1994, the unit transitioned to the F/A-18A/B Hornet. In 2004, the A's were upgraded to the A+, which included upgraded mission computers and weapons capabilities. In 2006, VFC-12 traded these F/A-18A+ models (which had low arrested landing fatigue life) for F/A-18Cs from VFA-87. Finally, in 2012, VFC-12 traded jets again with VFA-87 so that VFC-12 operated the F/A-18A+.

In 2021, the squadron converted to the Boeing F/A-18E/F Super Hornet.

== Mission ==
The squadron's primary focus is support to the Strike Fighter Advanced Readiness Program (SFARP), which trains operational fleet F/A-18 squadrons. SFARP is an intense, three-week training exercise conducted by the Strike Fighter Weapons School Atlantic that allows fleet strike fighter aircrews to hone their warfighting skills against a realistic adversary prior to deploying. In addition to the SFARP program, VFC-12 supports the F/A-18 fleet replacement squadrons at NAS Oceana and with detachments to NAS Key West. VFC-12 often averages more than 200 days a year on detachments.

== Awards ==
VFC-12 was awarded the Chief of Naval Operations Aviation Safety Award in 1978, 1980, 1981, 1992 and 1998. VFC-12 was awarded the Noel Davis Trophy for squadron readiness for 1980, 1984, 1985, 1995 and 1998. In January 1989, the squadron received a Meritorious Unit Commendation for sustained superior performance from 1 April 1987 to 31 March 1988. In 1998, VFC-12 was awarded the Battle "E", Noel Davis award for recognition as the best squadron in category for Carrier Air Wing Twenty. Also in 1998, Commander Naval Air Reserve Force recognized VFC-12 with an Aviation Safety Citation for achieving another year of Class A mishap free flying.

== See also ==
- Modern US Navy carrier air operations
- Naval aviation
- List of United States Navy aircraft squadrons
- List of Inactive United States Navy aircraft squadrons
