= VAW-121 =

Carrier Airborne Early Warning Squadron 121
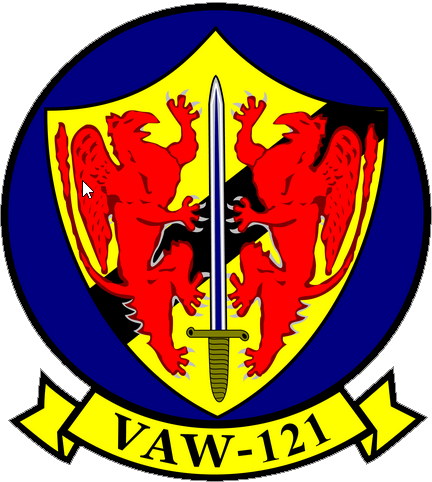
- Founded: 1 April 1967
- Country: United States
- Branch: United States Navy
- Type: Airborne Early Warning
- Part of: Carrier Air Wing 17
- Garrison/HQ: NAS Norfolk, Virginia
- Nickname: "Bluetails"
- Motto: Bluetails take care of Bluetails!
- Mascot: Griffin
- Engagements: Operation Desert Storm; Operation Southern Watch; Global War on Terrorism; War in Afghanistan; Iraq War; Operation Inherent Resolve Operation Epic Fury

Aircraft flown
- Electronic warfare: E-1 Tracer; E-2 Hawkeye

Airborne Command & Control Squadron 121 (VAW-121), also known as the "Bluetails", is an Airborne Early Warning (AEW) and Command and control (C2) squadron of the United States Navy, operating the E-2D Advanced Hawkeye. Established in 1967, the squadron is based at NAS Norfolk. It is currently assigned to Carrier Air Wing 17 and deploys aboard the aircraft carrier USS Nimitz

== Squadron History ==
=== 1960s ===
Along with VAW-122, VAW-123 and VAW-120, VAW-121 was created out of the "super squadron" VAW-12 on 1 April 1967. Until then, VAW-12 had deployed 4-plane detachments to accompany carrier air wings.

=== 1970s ===
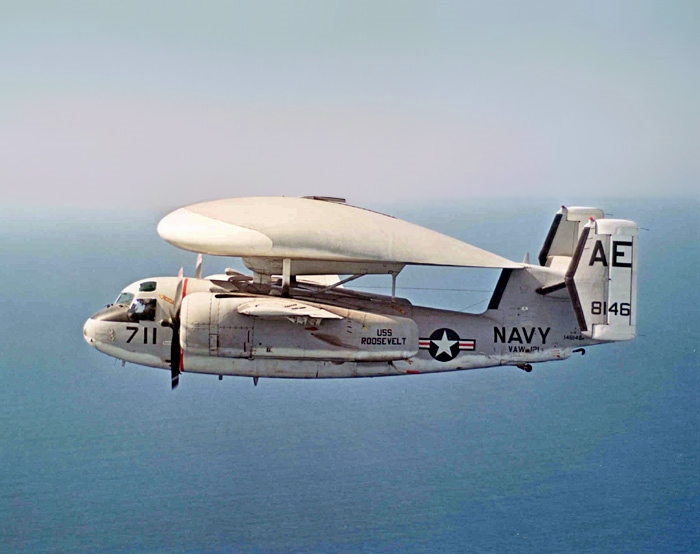
VAW-121 E-1B Tracer in 1971

Unlike its siblings, VAW-121 flew the E-1B Tracer, until the mid-1970s. This was due to the fact there were still carriers in the fleet that were not capable of handling for the larger E-2 Hawkeye, principally USS Franklin D. Roosevelt and the Essex-class carriers.

In July 1975, VAW-121 transitioned to the newer Grumman E-2C Hawkeye.

In 1978 VAW-121 made its first deployment as part of Carrier Air Wing Seven (CVW-7) on the newly commissioned USS Dwight D. Eisenhower. During this deployment, VAW-121 changed its squadron call sign from “Griffin” to “Bluetail” and adopted its current tail design.

=== 1980s ===
In 1980 VAW-121 deployed for 347 days at sea with Dwight D. Eisenhower/CVW-7 setting a modern-day record that would not be broken until the deployment of USS Theodore Roosevelt during Operation Enduring Freedom.

In 1981 the squadron deployed for three months to NAS Keflavik, Iceland, in support of the Icelandic Defense Force. Upon their return, VAW-121 deployed to the North Atlantic for a large NATO exercise in which VAW-121 kept squadron aircraft continuously airborne for 23 days.

The squadron returned to the Mediterranean Sea in January 1982 and was awarded its third consecutive Battle "E" and AEW Excellence Awards, both firsts for a VAW squadron. During this deployment, the squadron was involved in overseeing the evacuation of Americans from Beirut. Returning from the three-month winter deployment to Iceland, the squadron found themselves again in the North Atlantic conducting three CVBG operations with USS Forrestal and HMS Hermes, the later deploying with the new Sea Harrier.

The 1983 Mediterranean deployment included contingency operations near Libya and periods of 95 and 92 consecutive days at sea in support of multi-national peacekeeping forces in the Eastern Mediterranean.

=== 1990s ===
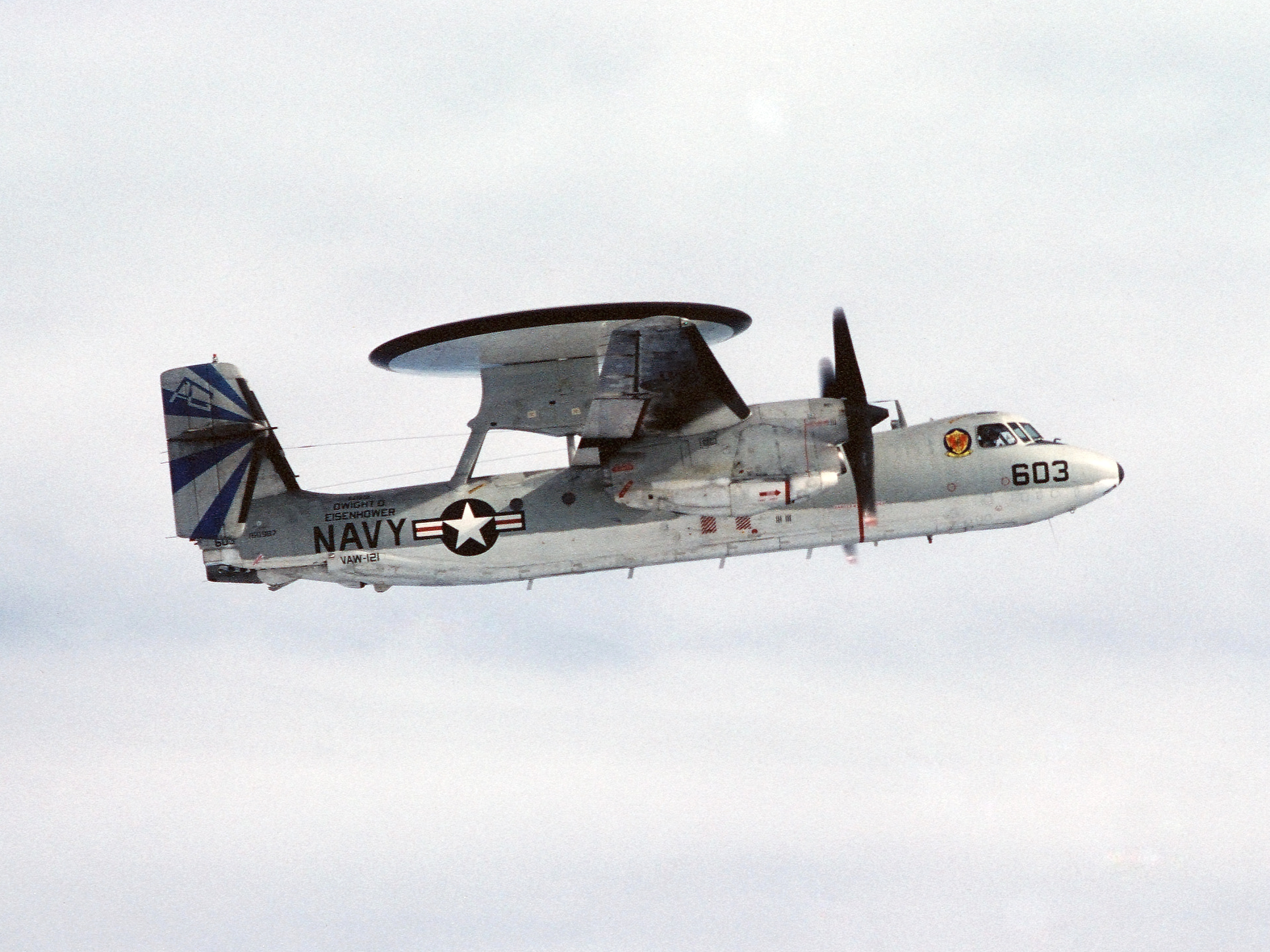
VAW-121 E-2C in April 1987

March 1990 saw VAW-121 embark on USS Dwight D. Eisenhower for another Mediterranean deployment. This deployment was highlighted by 15 days of around the clock operations in the Red Sea in support of the initial phase of Operation Desert Shield when external AEW support was non-existent. Once again, in March 1991, VAW-121 was awarded both the Battle "E" and AEW Excellence Awards for 1990.

In September 1991, the squadron sailed east once again on USS Dwight D. Eisenhower becoming the first battle group to return to Operation Desert Storm. Although hostilities had ended, the squadron provided coordination and control for several joint multi-national exercises. The cruise culminated in a two-week NATO exercise, Teamwork '92, in the fjords of Norway.

In September 1992, VAW-121 were reassigned to the navy's newest aircraft carrier, USS George Washington, and participated in its initial two-month "shakedown".

February 1993 found VAW-121 deployed to Howard Air Force Base, Panama. For two months, the squadron, as part of Joint Task Force 4, provided airborne surveillance to help stem the flow of drugs in the Central American region, fusing the efforts of the U.S. Air Force, DEA, and Coast Guard units in the interdiction of numerous narcotics flights.

On 20 May 1994, after an extensive work-up period, the squadron, embarked aboard USS George Washington for her maiden deployment. Highlights of the voyage included the commemoration of the 50th anniversary of D-Day off Normandy as well as critical participation in Operation Deny Flight over Bosnia-Herzegovina and Southern Watch over Iraq.

VAW-121 departed on deployment bound for the Mediterranean Sea and Arabian sea in January 1996. The squadron supported Operation Decisive Endeavor over Bosnia-Herzegovina and Southern Watch over Iraq. The squadron returned home in July 1996 and immediately began their transition to the new E-2C Group II aircraft. In December 1996, the squadron passed the 30 year-59,000 hours mishap free hour mark, the best safety record in carrier aviation.

In February 1998 the squadron deployed on board USS John C. Stennis. During the ship's around the world deployment, the squadron coordinated multi-service operations with the United States Air Force, United States Army, and United States Marine Corps in support of Joint Task Force-Southwest Asia Operation Southern Watch. In addition, the squadron controlled many multi-national exercises involving air and naval forces of Saudi Arabia, Kuwait, Bahrain, the United Arab Emirates, Oman, France, United Kingdom and Australia. The squadron went on to win three consecutive TOP HOOK awards and became the first E-2C squadron to win the CVW-7 TOP HOOK award for deployment. From October through December 1998 the squadron operated from NS Roosevelt Roads in support of Counter Narcotics operations. The squadron earned the "Triple Crown" of AEW Awards- the COMNAVAIRLANT Battle "E", the CNO Safety "S" and the Fred Akers AEW Excellence Award.

The squadron and CVW-7 returned to USS Dwight D. Eisenhower for their latest set of workups and deployment. In December 1999, the squadron passed the 33 year-64,000 hours mishap-free mark, the best safety record in carrier aviation. VAW-121 supported peacekeeping missions over Kosovo and Albania while operating in the Adriatic Sea. USS Eisenhower proceeded to the Persian Gulf to support Operation Southern Watch, while the squadron flew multiple missions over Kuwait in support of strikes on Iraq, providing command and control for the first strikes in the Eisenhower's 22-year history to actually drop bombs on foreign soil.

=== 2000s ===
In 2005, VAW-121 proved support or recovery efforts after Hurricane Katrina. While deployed aboard USS George Washington in May 2006, the squadron along with rest of battle group conducted training with the Colombian Navy. The exercise was part of "Partnership of the Americas." Between 2006-2009, participated in several multi-national deployments and exercises.

In 2009-2010, VAW-121 deployed in support of Operation Enduring Freedom on USS Dwight D. Eisenhower (CVN-69).

=== 2010s ===
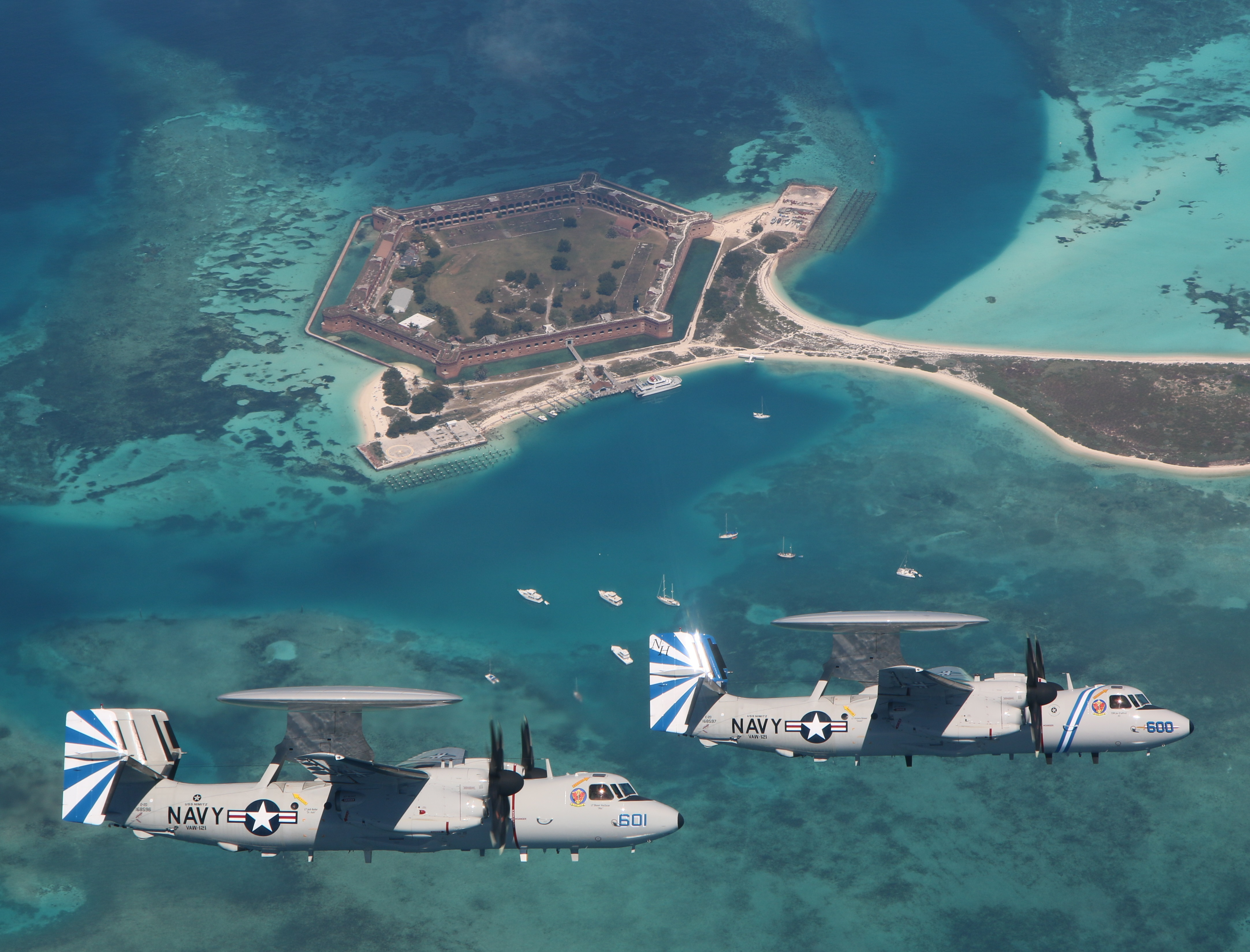
Two E-2D from VAW-121 over Fort Jefferson.

On returning from a mission on 31 March 2010, an E-2C Hawkeye suffered a catastrophic engine failure. The condition of the starboard engine made the aircraft almost impossible to control. The pilot, LT Steven Zilberman, made sure the aircraft stayed level so the other three crew members could bail out safely. Seconds later, the Hawkeye crashed into the sea. After three days of a massive search, he was declared lost at sea. For his courage, he was posthumously awarded the Distinguished Flying Cross.

The squadron began using its first E-2D Advanced Hawkeye aircraft in 2014, ending 37-years operating the E-2C Hawkeye, being the second fleet squadron to receive the Advanced Hawkeye.

In 2017, they deployed onboard USS Nimitz in support of Operation Inherent Resolve, performing combat Defensive Counter-Air (DCA) operations, being the first E-2 squadron to conduct combat DCA since 1991.Between 2019-2020, VAW-121 complete a near ten-month deployment around the world.

=== 2020s ===
On 1 January 2020 all VAW-squadrons were redesignated Airborne Command and Control Squadron. In 2022-2023, VAW-121 added aerial refueling capability, and deployed aboard the USS George H.W. Bush, in the U.S. Naval Forces Europe-Africa area of operations. The squadron was assigned to the United States Sixth Fleet to defend the U.S. and allies.

In April 2023, VAW-121 returned from deployment and conducted a scheduled maintenance period.

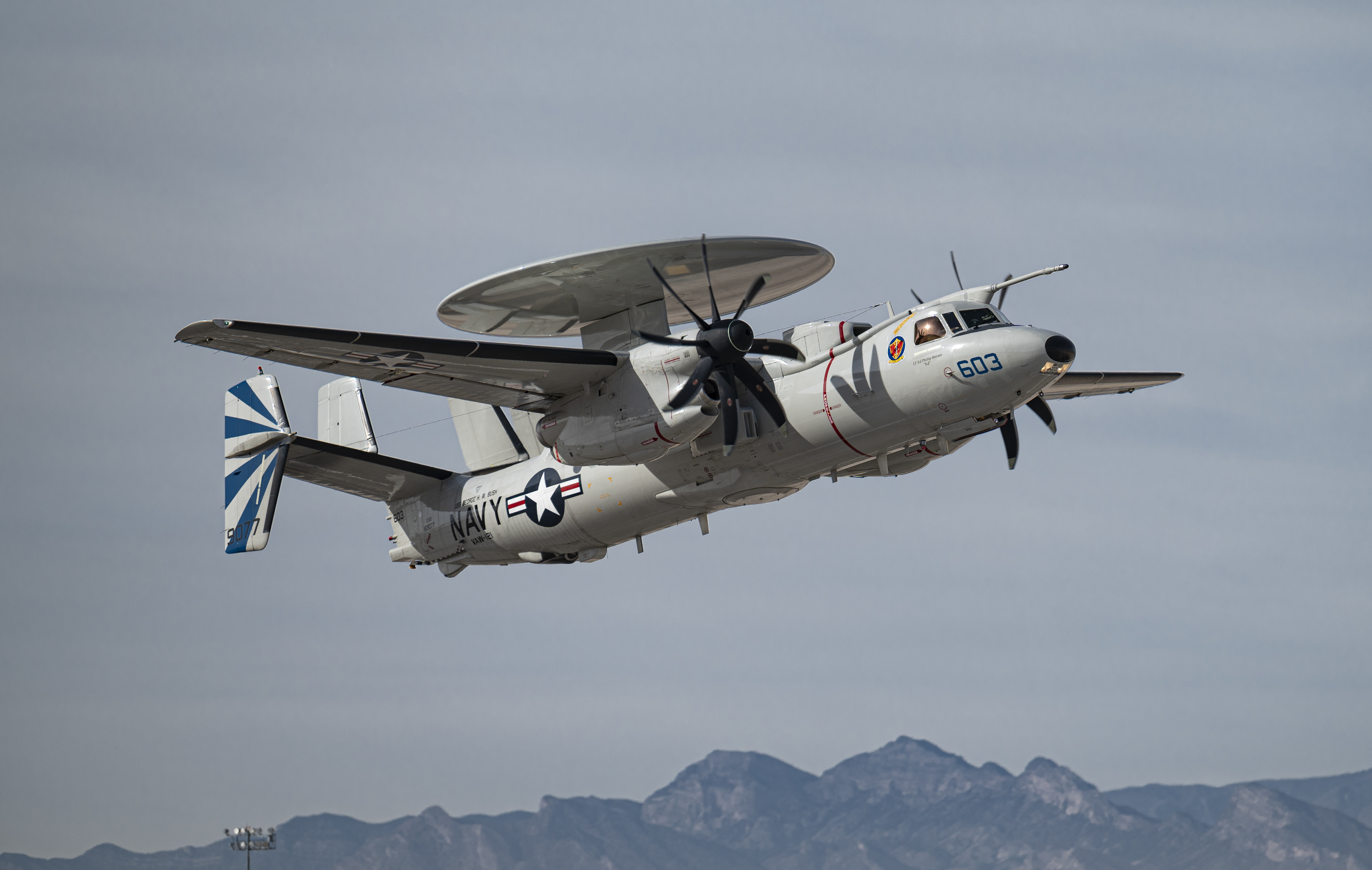
VAW-121 E-2D operated by Carrier Airborne Early Warning Weapons School (CAEWWS) takes off from Nellis AFB.

In the middle of March 2026, VAW-121 via Lajes Air Base and Aviano Air Base deployed across the Atlantic and Mediterranean for the Middle East. The deployment placed VAW-121 within the CENTCOM AOR for combat operations against Iran within Operation Epic Fury.

== See also ==
- History of the United States Navy
- List of United States Navy aircraft squadrons
