= Mascara Airfield =

Mascara Airfield
- Part of Twelfth Air Force

Site information
- Type: Military airfield
- Controlled by: United States Army Air Forces

Location
- Coordinates: 35°22′57.48″N 000°07′57.50″E

Site history
- Built: 1942
- In use: 1942-1943

Location of Mascara Airfield, Algeria

Mascara Airfield is an abandoned military airfield and later civilian airport in Algeria, located in the southwestern suburbs of Mascara.

During World War II it was used by the United States Army Air Force Twelfth Air Force during the North African Campaign against the German Afrika Korps.
