= VAW-120 =

Airborne Command & Control Squadron 120
- VAW-120 insignia
- Founded: 1 April 1967
- Country: United States of America
- Branch: United States Navy
- Type: Airborne early warning Carrier onboard delivery
- Part of: Fleet Replacement Squadron
- Garrison/HQ: Naval Station Norfolk
- Nickname(s): Greyhawks

Commanders
- Current commander: Commander David "Pawnshop" Wiltshire

Aircraft flown
- Electronic warfare: E-2C / E-2D Hawkeye
- Transport: C-2A(R) Greyhound

Airborne Command & Control Squadron 120 (VAW-120) is a United States Navy Fleet Replacement Squadron responsible for training crews on the E-2 Hawkeye and the C-2A(R) Greyhound.

== Squadron history ==
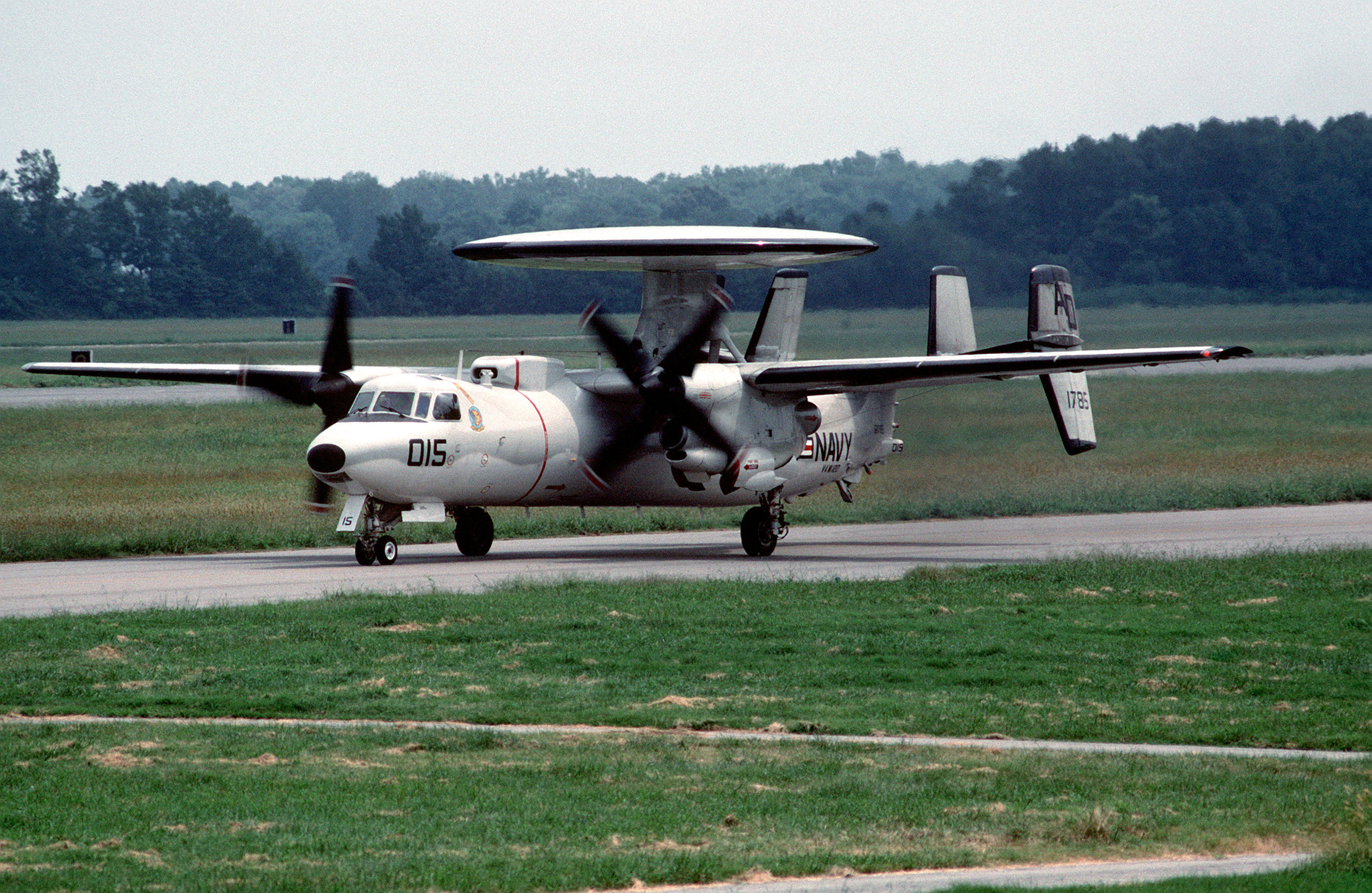
VAW-120 E-2C at NAS Oceana in 1989

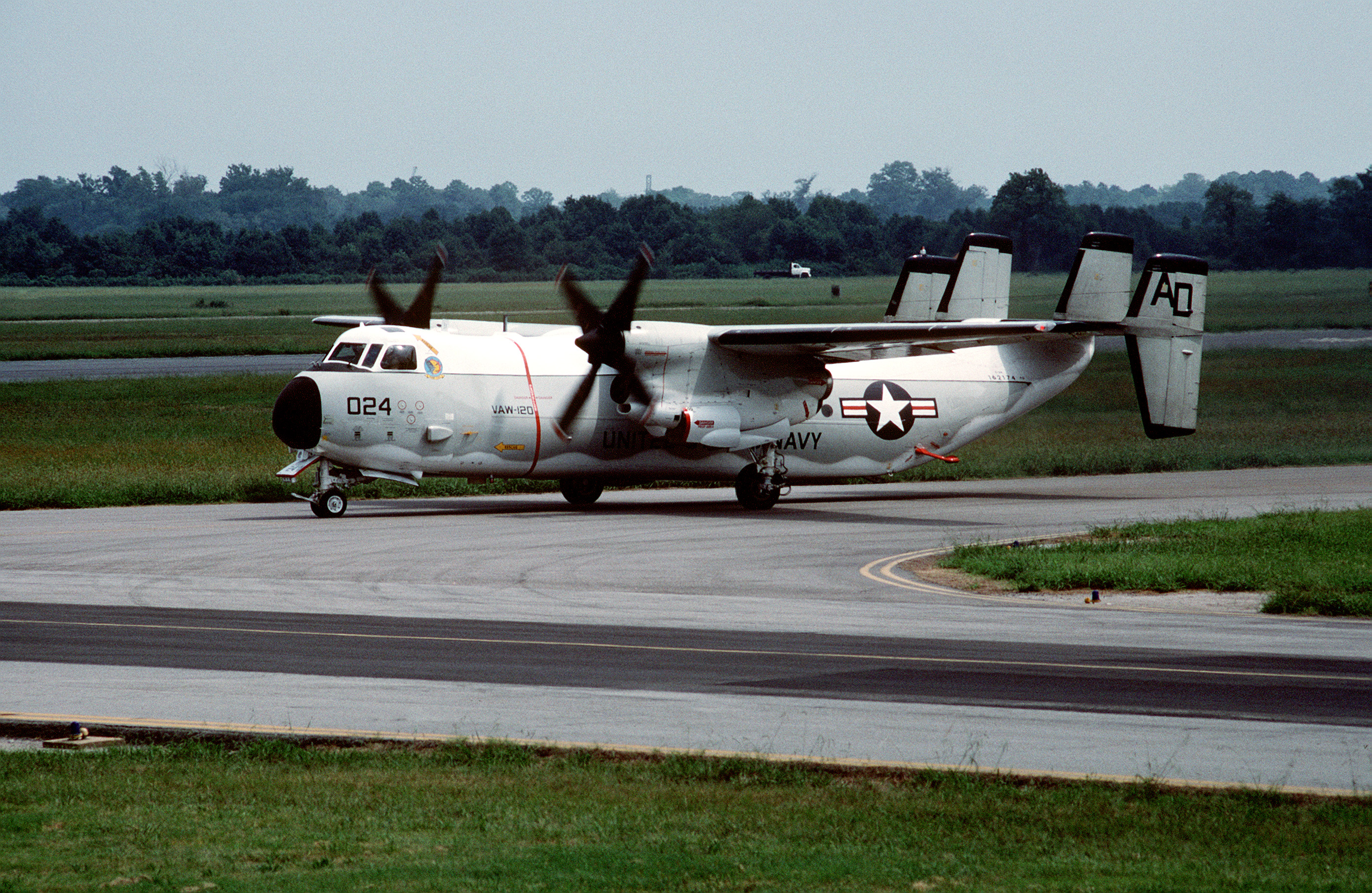
VAW-120 C-2A at NAS Oceana in 1989

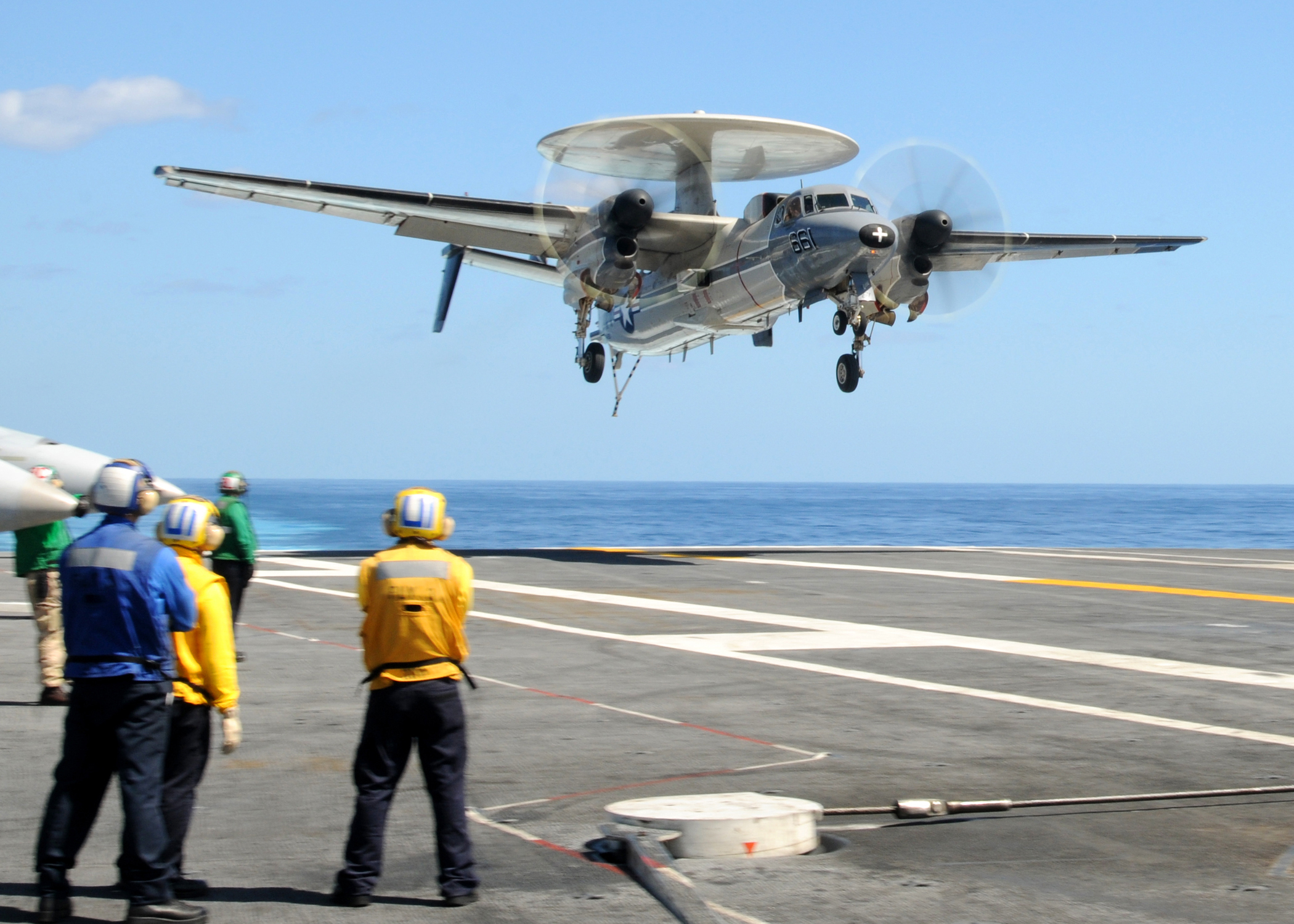
VAW-120 E-2C lands aboard USS George H. W. Bush

The squadron was originally established on 6 July 1948 as Carrier Airborne Early Warning Squadron TWO (VAW-2) at NAS Oceana. It later relocated to NAS Norfolk.

=== 1960s ===
In July 1966, VAW-12 received the first E-2A Hawkeye and was supplying detachments utilizing two different aircraft aboard ten Atlantic Fleet aircraft carriers in addition to training personnel for those detachments. With over 200 officers and 800 enlisted personnel, VAW-12 was reorganized as an Air Wing, and on 1 April 1967, Admiral T.E. Moore, Commander-in-Chief, U.S. Atlantic Fleet, commissioned Carrier Airborne Early Warning Wing Twelve with six operating squadrons. Later renamed RVAW-120, it became the Atlantic Fleet Replacement Squadron (FRS).

=== 1970s ===
The squadron received the E-2B Hawkeye aircraft in 1970, followed by the arrival of the E-2C on 31 May 1973. With the delivery of the first Advanced Radar Processing System (ARPS) aircraft in 1978, RVAW-120 trained Naval Flight Officers (NFO), Flight Technicians and maintenance personnel in both the APS-120 and APS-125 radars. This continued until 1980 when all east coast VAW squadrons completed the transition to the APS-125.

=== 1980s ===
In 1983, RVAW-120 officially became VAW-120, reflecting the task load of a fleet squadron and a training squadron. NFO training was moved to a new site in April 1983. Pilot training was also moved to the new E-2 Training Building in late 1984 for consolidation of the training mission. In June 1985, VAW-120 received the first re-procured C-2As delivered to the Navy. This delivery marked the commencement of a long-range procurement program designed to greatly enhance the Carrier onboard delivery (COD) capability for Carrier Battle Groups. The addition of the re-procured C-2A Greyhound brought the added responsibility of creating a new training program for the pilots and aircrew of Fleet Logistics Support Squadrons VRC-30 and VRC-40 which included the first ever C-2A night carrier qualifications.

=== 1990s ===
In November 1993, VAW-120 received its first E-2C+ aircraft. The E-2C continued its technological growth and in February 1994 the command took custody of its first E-2C (Group II) aircraft. This version of the E-2C introduced the APS-145 radar and Global Positioning System (GPS) to aid in navigation. VAW-120 became the single site Fleet Replacement Squadron in September 1994 when VAW-110, its west coast counterpart, was decommissioned.

=== 2000s ===
In response to the September 11 attacks, VAW-120 launched aircraft in support of homeland defense operations. their missions included airborne surveillance, ground communication relay, and track management along the east coast.

=== 2010s ===
In 2010, VAW-120 received its first C-2A Greyhound aircraft upgraded with a new 8-bladed propeller. In addition, VAW-120 received the E-2D Advanced Hawkeye.

== See also ==
- History of the United States Navy
- List of United States Navy aircraft squadrons
