= Grumman E-1 Tracer =

United States Navy airborne early warning aircraft

E-1 (WF) Tracer
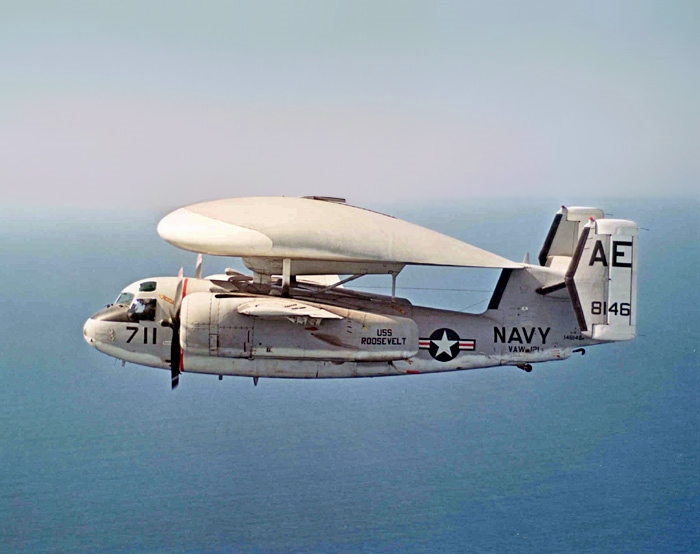
- E-1B Tracer

General information
- Type: Carrier-based airborne early warning
- National origin: United States
- Manufacturer: Grumman
- Primary user: United States Navy
- Number built: 88

History
- Introduction date: 1960
- First flight: 17 December 1956
- Retired: 1977
- Developed from: Grumman C-1 Trader

The Grumman E-1 Tracer (WF prior to 1962) was the first purpose-built airborne early warning aircraft used by the United States Navy. It was a derivative of the Grumman C-1 Trader and entered service in 1960. It was replaced by the more modern Grumman E-2 Hawkeye by the mid-1960s-1970s.

== Design and development ==
Following World War II, modified attack aircraft, including the AD-3W Skyraider and TBM-3W Avengers, filled the airborne early warning role. In 1951, the US Navy, seeking a replacement for the TBM-3W, asked Grumman and Vought for new AEW aircraft based on their competing designs for a carrier-based anti-submarine aircraft, the Grumman XS2F Tracker and the Vought XS2U. Grumman's design, Design 95, which was designated XWF-1 under the 1922 United States Navy aircraft designation system, used the same fuselage and wings as the XS2F, with an AN/APS-20 radar mounted on a pylon over the forward fuselage. The arrangement was chosen to not require changes to the Tracker's wing folding design. Two prototypes were ordered, but the project was cancelled late in 1952.

In 1955, engineers at Grumman Aircraft Engineering Corporation began studies on how to accommodate a new radar being developed by Hazeltine (which became the AN/APS-82) aboard a carried-based aircraft, and concluded that a design based on the Tracker would be the best option. When, later that year, the US Navy's Bureau of Aeronautics (BuAer) developed requirements for a new AEW aircraft, Grumman proposed a development of the Tracker, and began detailed work on the project.

The E-1 was designated WF under the 1922 United States Navy aircraft designation system; the designation earned it the nickname "Willy Fudd". The Tracer was derived from the C-1 Trader, itself a derivative of the S-2 Tracker carrier-based antisubmarine aircraft, known as S2F under the old system, nicknamed "Stoof", leading to the WF/E-1, with its distinctive radome, being known as "Stoof with a Roof." The E-1 featured folding wings of a very particular design for compact storage aboard aircraft carriers; unlike the S-2 and C-1 in which the wings folded upwards, the radome atop the fuselage required the E-1's designers to re-adopt an updated version of the Grumman-patented "Sto-Wing" folding wing system, pioneered on their earlier Grumman F4F-4 Wildcat piston-engined fighter of the early-WWII period, to fold its wings aftwards along the sides of the fuselage.

Its prototype made its first flight on December 17, 1956. Just over fourteen months later the first WF-2 (E-1B) Tracer made its maiden flight.

With carrier operations being a necessity for the aircraft, various features are geared towards providing stability and control when launching from and landing on an aircraft carrier. The distinct twin-tail found on the E-1 allows for greater rudder control and stability on the yaw axis without the implementation of one large unwieldy space-taking vertical stabilizer. It also provides a degree of redundancy, allowing a pilot to maintain some yaw control if one rudder is damaged. The positioning of the rudders also place them on the edges of the prop wash generated by the spinning propellers of the aircraft, creating additional stability as the fast wind flowing over the stabilizers creates a stronger rectifying force for any sideslip or rudder input than if the vertical stabilizers were placed out of the prop-wash zone. While this placement would lead to a yawing moment on most smaller aircraft, as the helical motion of the prop wash would collide with only one side of the vertical stabilizer, the dual propellers on the E-1 create opposing yawing torques on the aircraft of the same magnitude, leading to approximately net zero yaw as a result of prop wash.

The E-1, despite having a set of landing gear mounted under its nose, is a tail-dragger aircraft. This configuration provides the airframe with a distinct "nose-up" appearance when taxiing, and allows for the wings to generate more lift on launch from a catapult than if the aircraft was level due to the higher angle-of-attack (AoA) of the aircraft.

=== Radar ===
The Tracer was fitted with the Hazeltine AN/APS-82 in its radome and fuselage, a substantial upgrade to its predecessor the AN/APS-20. The AN/APS-82 featured an airborne moving target indicator (AMTI), which compares the video of one pulse time to the next in reflected radar energy to distinguish a flying aircraft from the clutter produced by wave action at the ocean's surface. The energy reflected from an aircraft changes position rapidly compared to the energy reflected from the surrounding sea.

The radar was also capable of ground stabilization and target height determination.

An airfoil-shaped dome protects the 17 by 5 feet (5.2 m × 1.5 m) parabolic dish antennae, mounted above the fuselage.

== Operational history ==
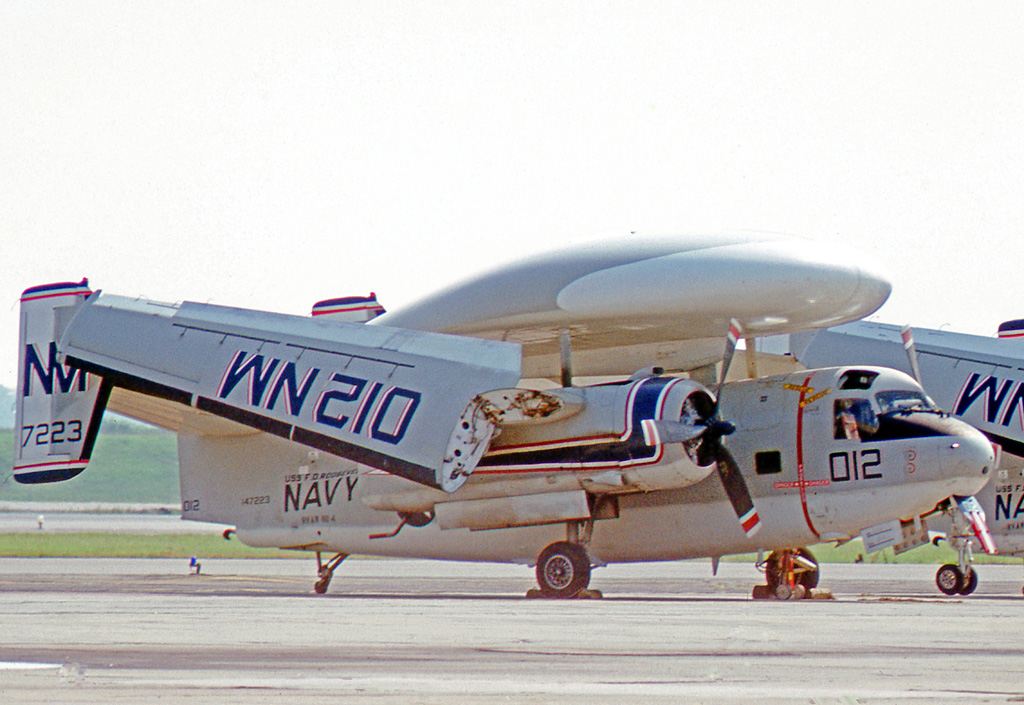
Grumman E-1B Tracer of RVAW-110 after service aboard USS Franklin D. Roosevelt in 1976, showing the Grumman-patented Sto-Wing wing folding arrangement

As one of the first carrier based early warning aircraft, the E-1 Tracer served from 1960 to 1977, although considered only an interim type, being replaced by the Grumman E-2 Hawkeye in the mid-1960s. First deployed with VAW-11 on board USS Constellation (CV-64). During the early years of the Vietnam War, E-1s saw extensive service, providing combat air patrol (CAP) fighters with target vectors, and controlling Alpha strikes over North Vietnam. With a radius of 250–300 miles, the E-1B served as an early warning to strike aircraft of enemy MiG activity. Tracer-equipped VAW squadrons logged 56 deployments in support of operations over Southeast Asia.

By May 1973, most E-1Bs were retired, with only four VAW-121 Tracers based at NAS Norfolk, Virginia, still in service. These aircraft were soon retired during mid-summer 1977 following a final cruise on board USS Franklin D. Roosevelt and were ferried to the Davis-Monthan storage facility. The E-1B Tracer was struck from the inventory by 1977.

== Variants ==
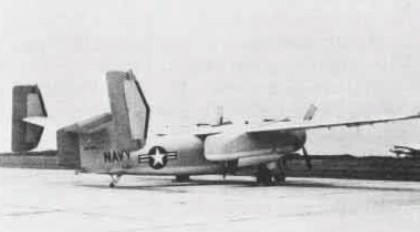
The WF-2 prototype.

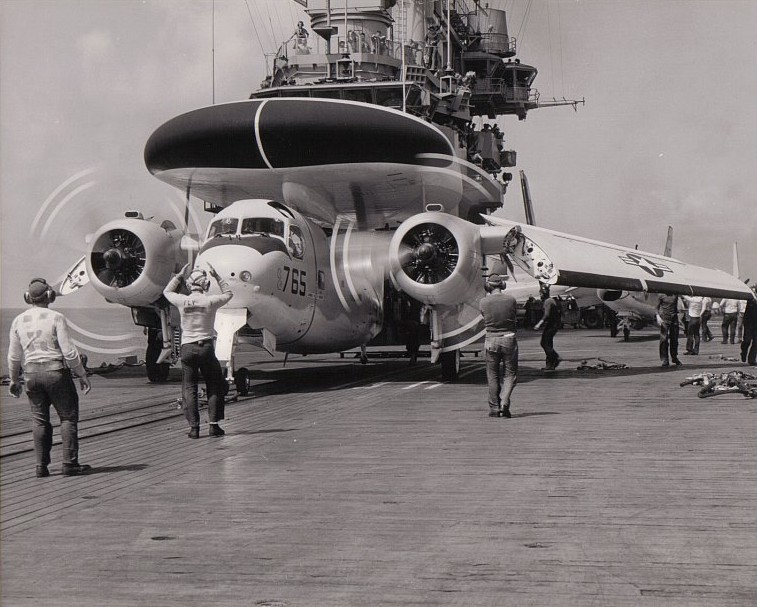
WF-2 of VAW-11 on the catapult of USS Hancock in 1962

XWF-1
Proposed AEW derivative of the S2F-1 equipped with the AN/APS-20; not built.
G-117
Company designation for WF-2. One TF-1 (BuNo 136792) converted into aerodynamic prototype for WF-2 without electronics, later rebuilt as a standard C-1A, retaining the twin tail.
WF-2
Production Airborne Early Warning version of the TF-1 Trader, redesignated E-1B in 1962, 88 built.
E-1B
WF-2 redesignated in 1962.

== Operators ==
United States

- United States Navy
  - VAW-11
  - VAW-12
  - VAW-121

== Aircraft on display ==
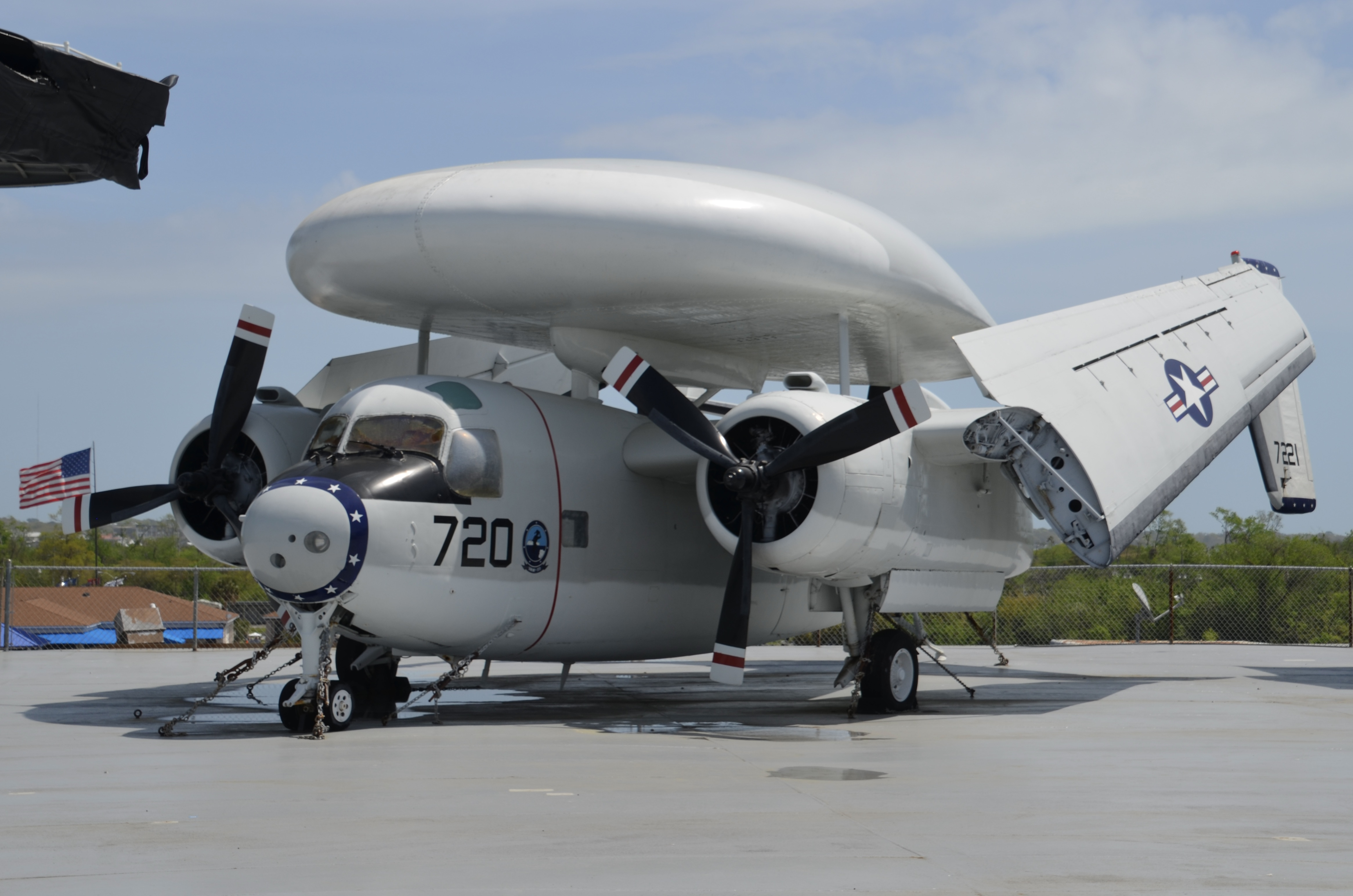
E-1B 147225 at Patriots Point Naval & Maritime Museum

There are five E-1 Tracers preserved at museums throughout the United States:

- E-1B, BuNo 147212: Intrepid Sea, Air & Space Museum, New York City
- E-1B, BuNo 147217: New England Air Museum, Windsor Locks, Connecticut
- E-1B, BuNo 147225: On board the USS Yorktown (CV-10), Patriots Point, Mount Pleasant, South Carolina
- E-1B, BuNo 147227: Pima Air & Space Museum, adjacent to Davis-Monthan AFB in Tucson, Arizona
- E-1B, BuNo 148146: National Naval Aviation Museum, Naval Air Station Pensacola

Another 11 E-1 Tracers are in storage at United Aeronautical, an aircraft surplus yard located just outside Davis–Monthan Air Force Base in Tucson, Arizona. At least one of those aircraft (E-1B, BuNo 148922) was sold to a private collector in 2011 with the intent to restore to fly, although no updates on the project have been posted since 2012.

== Specifications ==
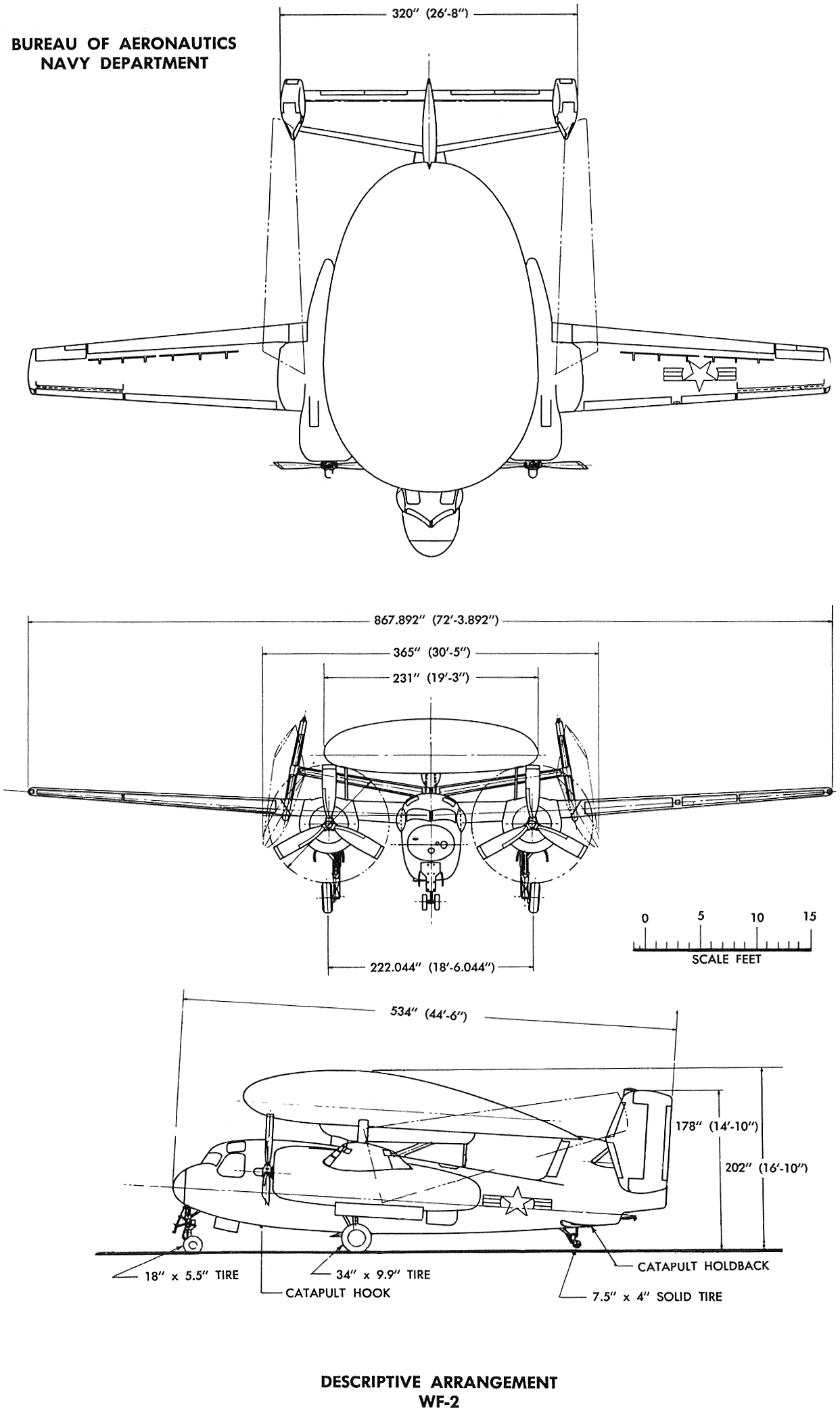
3-view line drawing of the Grumman WF-2 Tracker

Data from Standard Aircraft Characteristics

General characteristics

- Crew: 4 (2 flight crew with 2 radar/intercept controllers)
- Length: 45 ft 4 in (13.82 m)
- Wingspan: 72 ft 4 in (22.05 m)
- Height: 16 ft 10 in (5.13 m)
- Wing area: 506 sq ft (47.0 m^{2})
- Airfoil: root: NACA 63A420; tip: NACA 63A415
- Empty weight: 20,638 lb (9,361 kg)
- Gross weight: 24,800 lb (11,249 kg)
- Max takeoff weight: 26,600 lb (12,066 kg)
- Powerplant: 2 × Wright R-1820-82A Cyclone 9-cylinder air-cooled radial piston engines, 1,525 hp (1,137 kW) each for take-off
- Propellers: 3-bladed constant-speed reversible propellers

Performance

- Maximum speed: 238 mph (383 km/h, 207 kn) at 4,000 ft (1,200 m)
- Cruise speed: 163 mph (262 km/h, 142 kn)
- Range: 1,035 mi (1,666 km, 899 nmi)
- Endurance: 6 hours 50 minutes
- Service ceiling: 15,800 ft (4,800 m)
- Rate of climb: 1,120 ft/min (5.7 m/s)

Avionics

- Radar: AN/APS-82

== See also ==
Related development

- Grumman C-1 Trader
- Grumman S-2 Tracker

Aircraft of comparable role, configuration, and era

- Fairey Gannet AEW.3
- Northrop Grumman E-2 Hawkeye
