= VAW-12 =

US Navy squadron

Carrier Airborne Early Warning Squadron 12
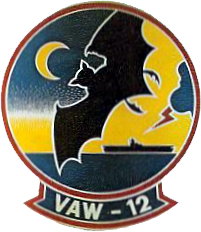
- Active: 1956– 1 April 1967
- Country: United States of America
- Branch: United States Navy
- Type: Airborne Early Warning
- Nickname(s): "Bats"

Aircraft flown
- Electronic warfare: E-2 Hawkeye; WF-2 Tracer; AD-5W Skyraider

Carrier Airborne Early Warning Squadron 12 (VAW-12), nicknamed the "Bats", was a U.S. Navy Carrier Airborne Early Warning Squadron. The squadron was disestablished on 1 April 1967.

== Squadron history ==
On 6 July 1948, VAW-2 (Carrier Airborne Early Warning Squadron TWO) was established at NAS Norfolk. The squadron quickly moved to NAS Quonset Point, and was redesignated VC-12. In succession, it operated the TBM Avenger, AF Guardian, and the AD-5W Skyraider.

In 1956, the squadron was re-designated VAW-12 (Carrier Airborne Early Warning Squadron TWELVE) and acquired a new aircraft, the "Guppy" version of the Skyraider. In 1961, the WF-2 Tracer, affectionately called the "Willie Fudd", arrived, and the following year the squadron returned to NAS Norfolk.

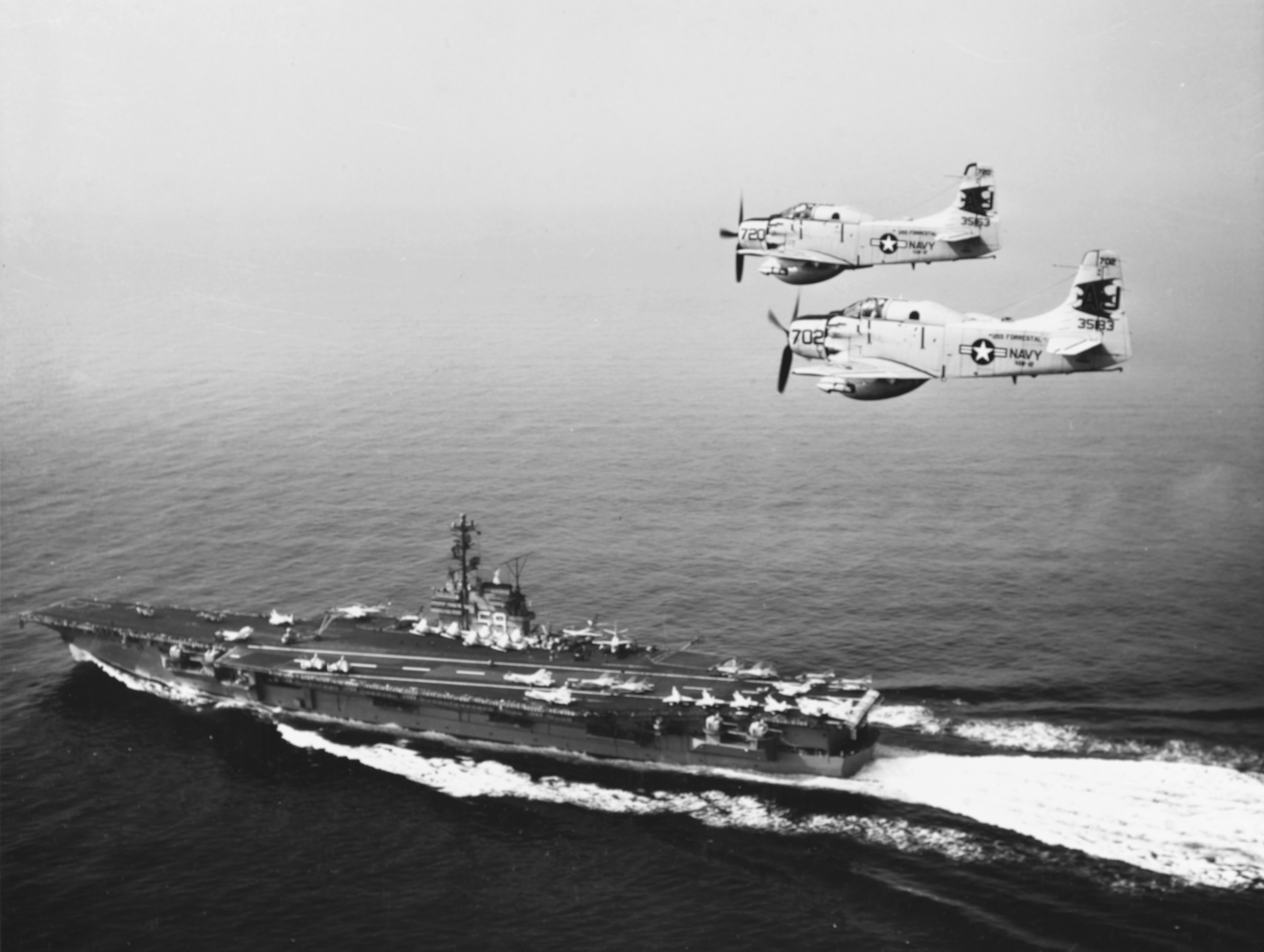
Two of VAW-12's AD-5W Skyraider AEW aircraft fly over USS Forrestal (CVA-59), while she was operating with the Sixth Fleet in the Mediterranean Sea, 25 April 1960.

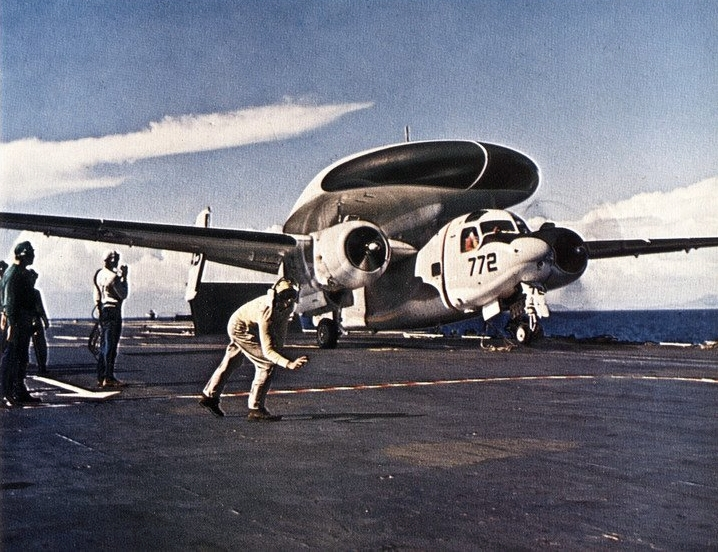
E-1B VAW-12 on cat of USS FD Roosevelt (CVA-42) 1961

In July 1966, VAW-12 received its first E-2A Hawkeye and was supplying detachments using two different aircraft aboard ten aircraft carriers of the Atlantic Fleet, as well as training personnel for those detachments. The squadron had grown to over 200 officers and 800 enlisted personnel, and VAW-12 was reorganized as an air wing.

On 1 April 1967, VAW-12 was disestablished and Carrier Airborne Early Warning Wing Twelve was formed to command all Atlantic Fleet Airborne Early Warning (AEW) efforts. Replacement Airgroup Squadron RVAW-120 was formed to train aviators and enlisted personnel in carrier-based AEW aircraft. VAW-121, VAW-122, and VAW-123 were formed on the same day from former VAW-12 operating detachments.

== See also ==
- History of the United States Navy
- List of inactive United States Navy aircraft squadrons
