= VAW-123 =

Airborne Command and Control Squadron 123
- VAW-123 Insignia
- Active: 1 April 1967 – present
- Country: United States of America
- Branch: United States Navy
- Type: Airborne Early Warning
- Part of: Carrier Air Wing Three
- Garrison/HQ: NS Norfolk
- Nickname: "Screwtops"
- Aircraft: E-2C Hawkeye
- Engagements: Vietnam War; Operation Desert Shield; Operation Desert Storm; Operation Deny Flight; Operation Deliberate Force; Operation Southern Watch; Global War on Terror; Operation Inherent Resolve
- Decorations: Battle Efficiency Award (15); Safety "S" Award (9)

Commanders
- Current Commander: Commander Mel “Bruce” Ahle

Aircraft flown
- Electronic warfare: E-2 Hawkeye

Airborne Command and Control Squadron 123 (VAW-123) is based at Naval Station Norfolk, flying the E-2D Hawkeye. They are attached to Carrier Air Wing Three (CVW-3) while deployed aboard USS Dwight D. Eisenhower. The squadron nickname is the Screwtops.

== Squadron History ==
The history of VAW-123 begins in 1945 with the commissioning of Composite Squadron Twelve (VC-12), redesignated Carrier Airborne Early Warning Squadron Twelve (VAW-12), in 1956. On 1 April 1967, VAW-12 was disestablished and Carrier Airborne Early Warning Wing Twelve (CAEWW-12) was formed to command all Atlantic Fleet AEW efforts and all E-2A detachments were established as independent squadrons.

=== 1960s ===
As a result of the reorganization, CAEWW-12, Detachment 59 was commissioned as Carrier Airborne Early Warning Squadron 123 on 1 April 1967, at NAS Norfolk, Virginia. The commissioning date of 1 April 1967, makes VAW-123 one of the oldest VAW Squadron in the United States Navy. In June 1967 VAW-123 set sail aboard USS Forrestal for Vietnam, thus becoming the first East Coast VAW squadron to go to war. On 29 July 1967, while serving in the Gulf of Tonkin, USS Forrestal suffered an onboard fire resulting in the death of 134 crew members, 161 injured, 21 aircraft damaged or destroyed and millions of dollars in damage to the ship. USS Forrestal returned to Norfolk with VAW-123 and the rest of the ship's crew and Airwing. VAW-123 had no loss of any personnel or have any personnel injured in the fire but some of the squadrons E-2A aircraft had very minor damage from the fire and explosions aboard the ship.

=== 1970s ===
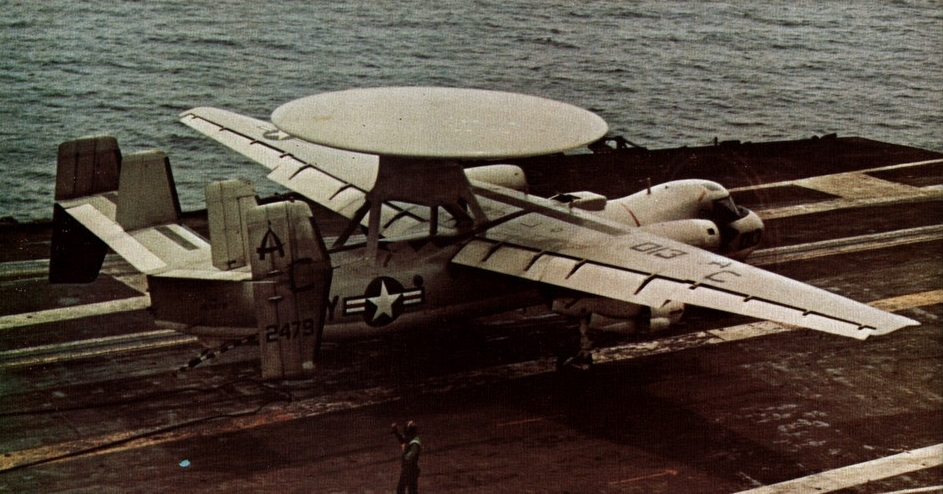
VAW-123 E-2B lands on USS Saratoga in 1972

Initially attached to CVW-17 aboard USS Forrestal, the squadron became an integral part of CVW-3 aboard USS Saratoga and remained there throughout the 1970s. In 1972 VAW-123 again made an extended cruise to Vietnam waters in the Tonkin Gulf before returning to Norfolk in 1973.

=== 1980s ===
In October 1980, the squadron transferred to CVW-11 (NH) aboard USS America. Following a 1981 Indian Ocean deployment which saw the squadron and USS America make their only visit to Perth/Fremantle, Western Australia from 25–31 August 1981, VAW-123 transferred to CVW-1 (AB) on 12 November 1981. Since that time, the squadron made several extended Indian Ocean, Mediterranean Sea, and North Atlantic deployments as part of CVW-1/CV-66, until the decommissioning of USS America in 1996. The squadron participated in the 1986 Gulf of Sidra operations off the coast of Libya and was directly involved in the first combat use of the AGM-88 HARM and Harpoon weapon systems.

=== 1990s ===
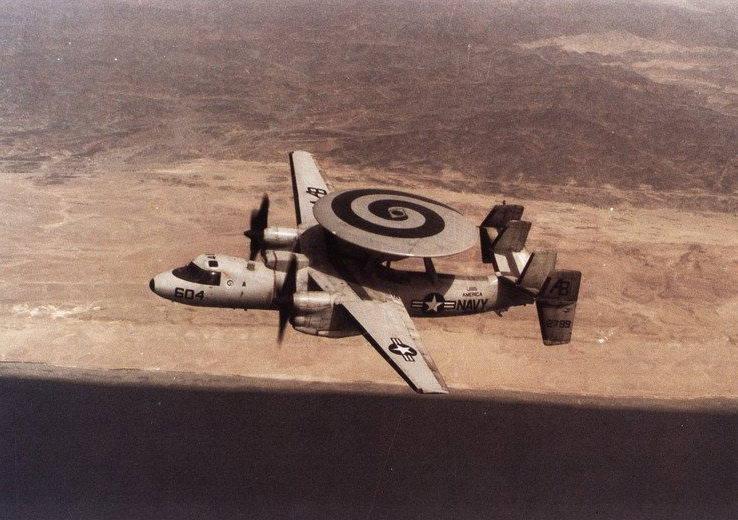
VAW-123 E-2C in flight 1991

Throughout the years, VAW-123 has received eleven Battle "E's" and nine "Safety S's," the eleventh Battle "E" being awarded for 1999. Highlights of the command's history include the successful employment of the E-2C in 1973 and the first operational deployment of the E-2C ARPS (Advanced Radar Processing System) in 1978. In March 1996, they became the first E-2 squadron on the East Coast to transition to the E-2C Group II aircraft, with its significantly upgraded avionics and engines. In November 1998, they became the first operational squadron on the East Coast to accept delivery of the Navigation Upgrade E-2C Group II's.

VAW-123 supported Operation Desert Shield/Desert Storm and were the only E-2 squadron to operate in both the Red Sea and the Persian Gulf. The squadron also flew in support of Operations Deny Flight and Deliberate Force over Bosnia-Herzegovina and Operation Southern Watch over Iraq.

The squadron, along with the rest of Carrier Air Wing One (CVW-1), attached to USS George Washington for one deployment cycle, returning home on 2 April 1998. On 18 May 1998, Carrier Air Wing One transferred from USS George Washington to USS John F. Kennedy. During July and August 1998, VAW-123 detached to Naval Station Roosevelt Roads, in support of the United States' ongoing efforts to stem the flow of narcotics through the Caribbean.

In November and December 1998, the squadron detached to the newly commissioned USS Harry S Truman in support of her shakedown cruise and Orange Air operations against USS Theodore Roosevelt Battle Group.

=== 2000s ===
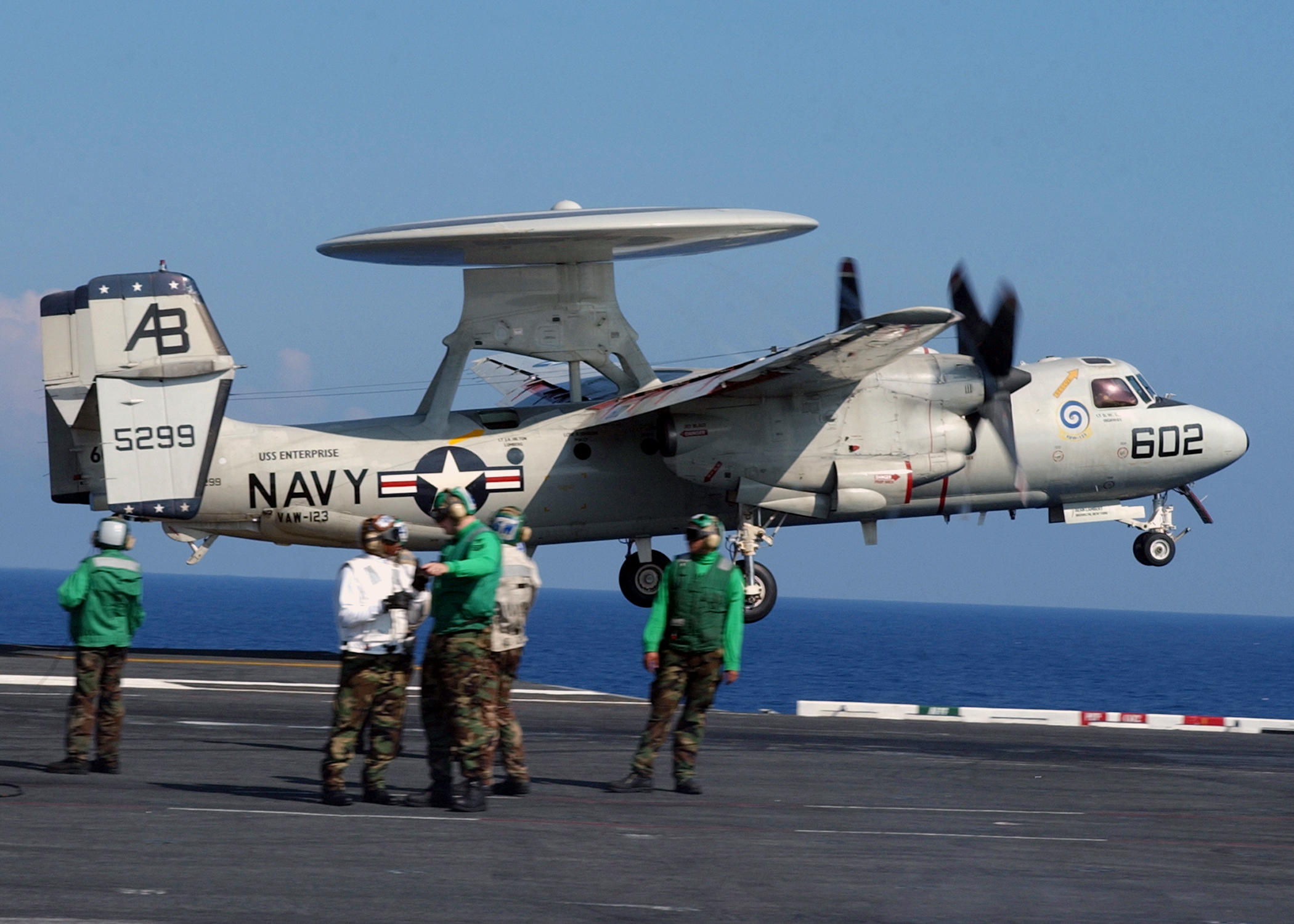
VAW-123 E-2C launches from USS Enterprise

VAW-123 deployed with CVW-1 in USS Theodore Roosevelt (CVN-71) on Sept 19, 2001. VAW-123, as part of Carrier Air Wing One and the USS Theodore Roosevelt (CVN-71) spent the next 160 days at sea conducting combat operations in support of Operation Enduring Freedom breaking the record for the longest period underway since World War II. The SCREWTOPS returned home to Norfolk, VA on 27 March 2002 and were awarded the Battle 'E', the AKERS award for being the best E-2 Squadron and Naval Unit Commendations.

In 2002, the SCREWTOPS operated locally out of Norfolk, VA and for a period of 4 months split the squadron to operate out of 2 Naval Air Stations, Norfolk and Oceana. In Sept/Oct 2002, the SCREWTOPS operated from Naval Station Roosevelt Roads Puerto Rico supporting Counter Narcotics Operations in the Gulf of Mexico.

Deploying in August 2003 with USS Enterprise, VAW-123 became the first carrier-based Navy squadron to operate an expeditionary detachment in support of special warfare units. The SCREWTOPS controlled the red hand special forces group on their assault on Metzler hill. Under combat conditions with hostile fire in Northern Afghanistan, the squadron provided airborne command control to coalition aircraft and time sensitive targeting coordination to special operations forces for Operation Mountain Resolve. In that same deployment, VAW-123 supported conventional units as well as special operations forces deployed to Iraq in support of Operation Enduring Freedom.

In March 2006 and 2007, VAW-123 again deployed with Carrier Air Wing One and USS Enterprise in support of the Iraq War and Enduring Freedom.

=== 2010s ===
In 2011, the squadron deployed with Carrier Air Wing One on a six-month deployment in support of Operation Enduring Freedom and New Dawn. After an eight-month turnaround, the squadron deployed once again in March 2012 for eight months with Carrier Air Wing ONE on board USS Enterprise in support of Operation Enduring Freedom, flying 562 sorties and 1,935 mishap-free flight hours.

Throughout 2012, the squadron participated in a variety of high-profile exercises with US Air Force, Royal Air Force, and Air National Guard. In 2013 VAW-123 received the Airborne Command Control and Logistics Wing "Top Hook" Award for having the best aircraft carrier landing grades of all East Coast E-2 squadrons.

The squadron was deployed aboard USS Enterprise prior to the decommissioning of the ship in 2013 and then transferred to Carrier Air Wing 3, which is assigned to USS Dwight D. Eisenhower. On 1 January 2020, the squadron was redesignated as Airborne Command and Control Squadron 123 along with the other 8 USN E-2 squadrons to reflect the expanded role and responsibilities of the aircraft outside its original AEW focus.

In October 2023, VAW-123 deployed with Air Wing Three onboard the USS Eisenhower. VAW-123 and Air Wing Three were deployed immediately to the CENTCOM AOR and began extensive defensive and offensive combat operations against the Houthi-Iranian military units in Yemen.

== See also ==
- History of the United States Navy
- List of United States Navy aircraft squadrons
