= VRC-40 =

Logistics aircraft squadron of the US Navy

Fleet Logistics Support Squadron 40
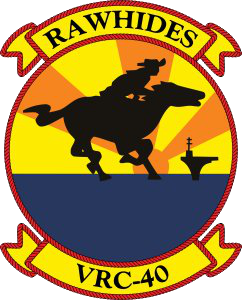
- VRC-40 Insignia
- Active: 1 July 1960 – 23 July 2026
- Country: United States
- Branch: United States Navy
- Role: Medium Lift
- Garrison/HQ: Naval Station Norfolk, Virginia
- Nickname: "Rawhides"

Commanders
- Current commander: CDR Paul "PETA" Ingram

Aircraft flown
- Transport: Grumman C-2A Greyhound

Fleet Logistics Support Squadron 40 (VRC-40), also known as the "Rawhides", was a United States Navy fleet logistics support squadron based at NS Norfolk. Commissioned in 1960, it was the last active fleet logistics squadrons in the Navy, since VRC-30 decommissioned in 8 December 2023.

== History ==
Fleet Logistics Support Squadron 40 (VRC-40) was commissioned on 1 July 1960 and is tasked with providing Carrier onboard delivery (COD) services to the U.S. Navy's Second, Fifth, and Sixth Fleets. VRC-40, homeported at NS Norfolk, operates the Grumman C-2A Greyhound and reports to Commander, Airborne Early Warning Wing, U.S. Atlantic Fleet.

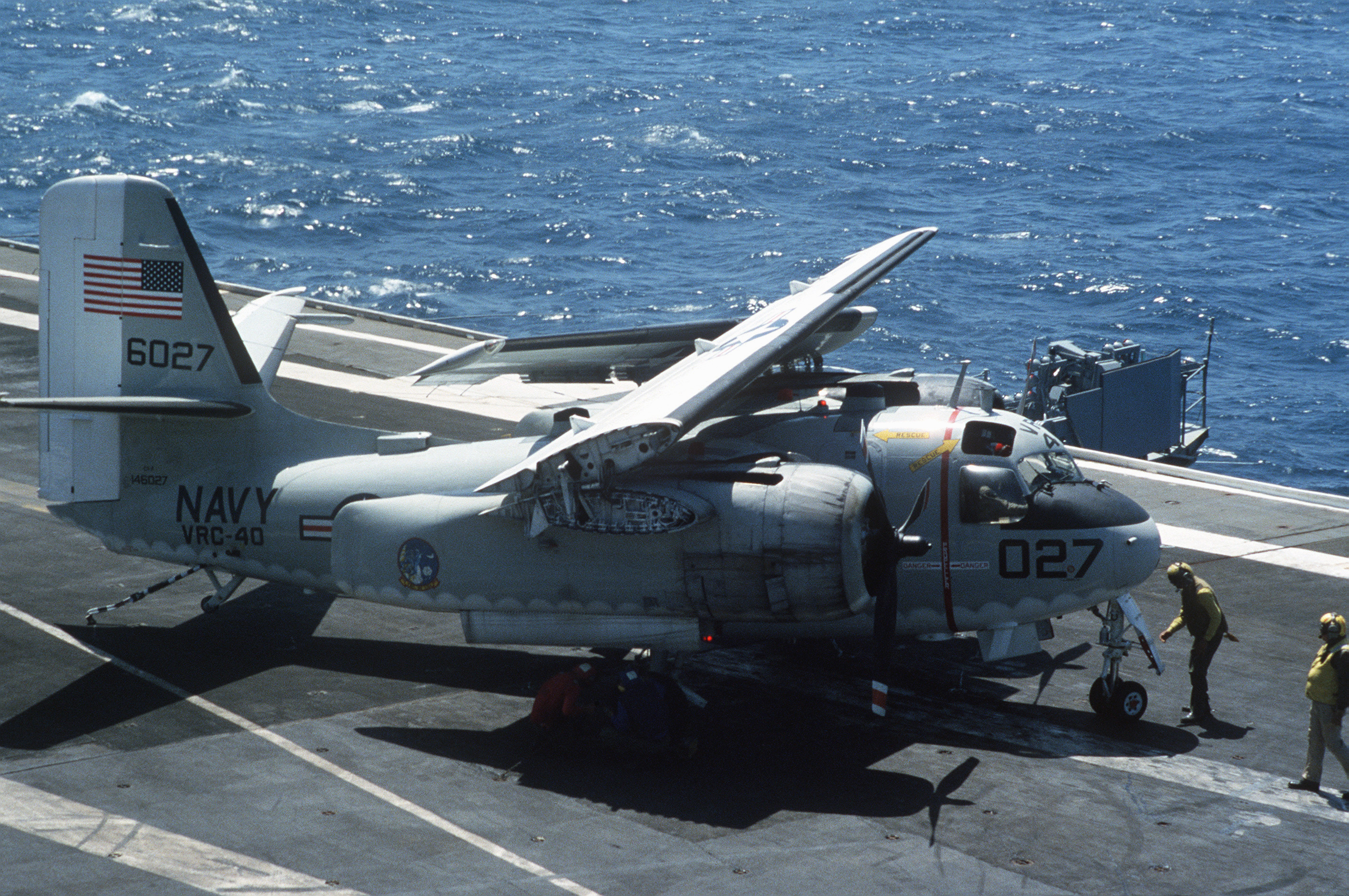
A VRC-40 C-1 Trader on the USS Lexington (AVT-16) in 1985.

Maintaining and flying the squadron's 14 aircraft are nearly 320 enlisted personnel and 42 officers. Unlike most squadrons, VRC-40 does not deploy as a unit. Instead, it prepares five separate sea going detachments with a two-plane complement while maintaining ashore "Homeguard" to support local operational commitments. Based at remote forward logistics sites, the deployed detachments support multiple carrier strike groups that operate in the Second, Fourth, Fifth, and Sixth Fleets aboard deployed aircraft carriers providing continuous fleet support. VRC-40 supports the fleet from ships and bases as far north as Norway, down the Eastern Seaboard and Gulf Coast, throughout the Caribbean, in Central and South America, and all over the Mediterranean and Middle Eastern theaters. Recently, VRC-40 played a vital role in support of combat missions during Operations Enduring and Iraqi Freedom and was selected as the Commander Naval Air Force Battle "E" winner for the 2010 calendar year.

After flying the Grumman C-1A Trader aircraft for over 26 years, VRC-40 completed a transition to the C-2A in 1986, marking the end of the reciprocating engine era in Naval Aviation history. VRC-40's continuing mission is the efficient transportation of passengers, mail, and cargo to and from carriers at sea.

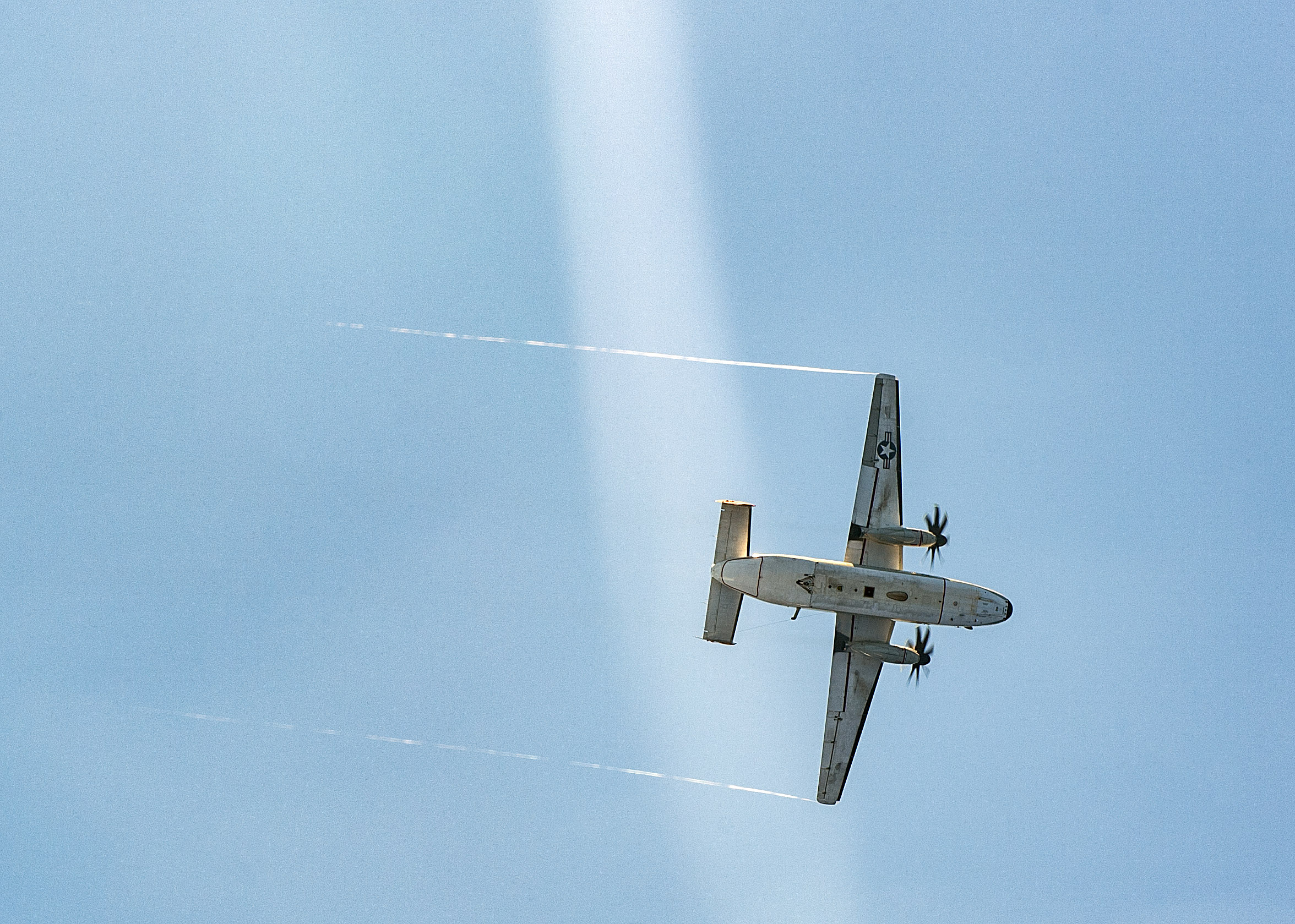
A C-2A Greyhound attached to the "Rawhides" of Fleet Logistics Support Squadron (VRC) 40 flies over the aircraft carrier USS George H.W. Bush (CVN-77) on 17 July 2019

While speed and efficiency are requisite to completion of the squadron's mission, safety is of paramount importance. Among VRC-40's many achievements and accomplishments, the "Rawhides" recently reached one of the highest honors in Aviation Safety by successfully completing 25 years of class "A" mishap free flying.

Every year, VRC-40 carries over 1,300 ton (three million pounds) of mail and cargo and effects over 1,000 arrested landings. Astronauts Alan Shepard and Scott Carpenter, sports icons including Tiger Woods, Dale Earnhardt Jr., numerous Congressional and Cabinet members, business leaders, and entertainers such as Bruce Willis, Charlie Daniels, Jimmy Buffett, Halle Berry and Robin Williams have all flown aboard "Rawhides" aircraft.

== See also ==
- History of the United States Navy
- List of United States Navy aircraft squadrons
