= USS Midway Museum =

Museum in San Diego, California

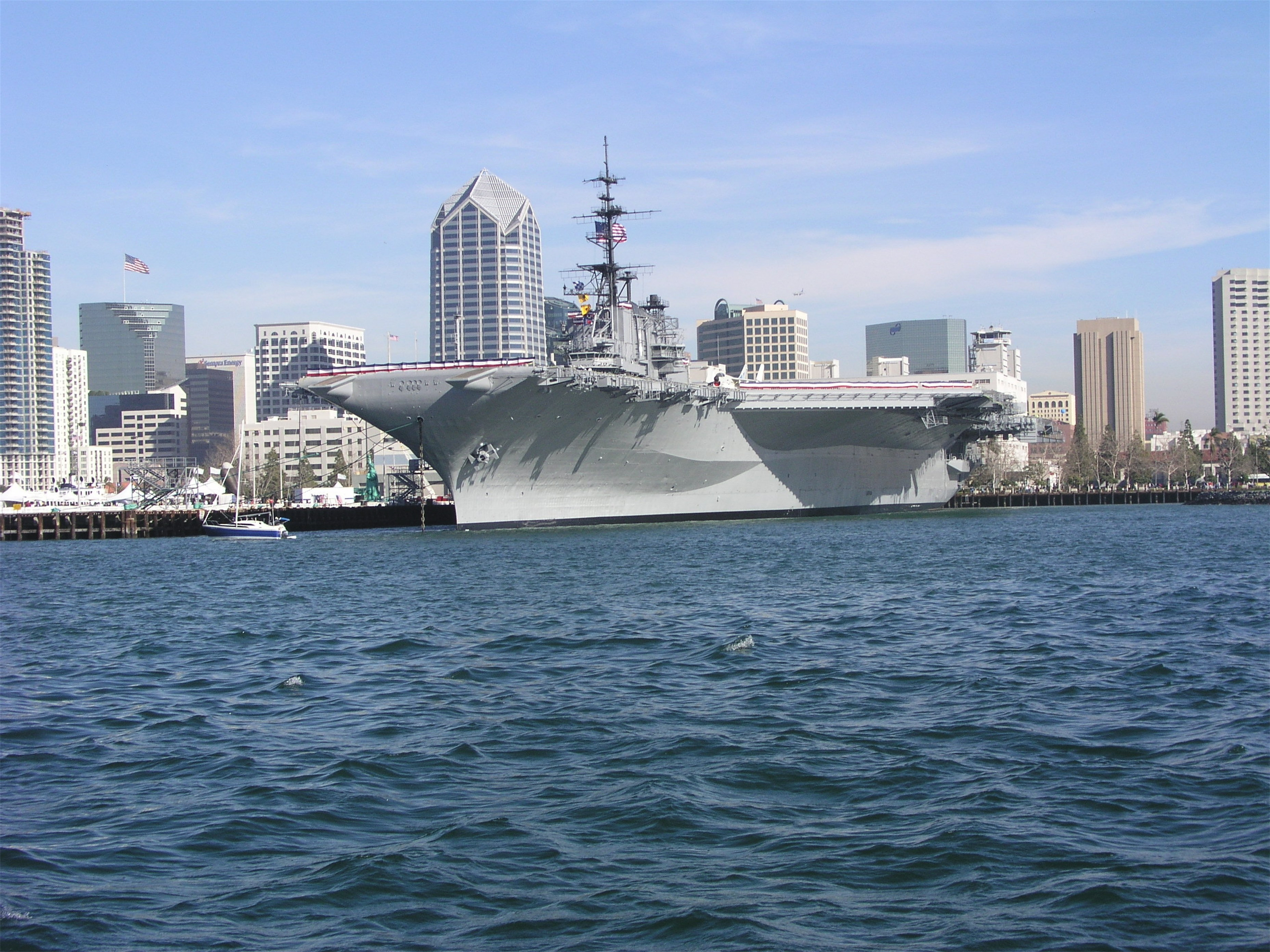
- Midway moored at its permanent resting place at Navy Pier to this day in San Diego where it became the largest museum devoted to carriers and naval aviation. (2007)

- Location within San Diego Location within California Location within the United States
- Established: 7 June 2004
- Coordinates: 32.71445°N 117.17315°W
- Type: Maritime museum
- Website: www.midway.org

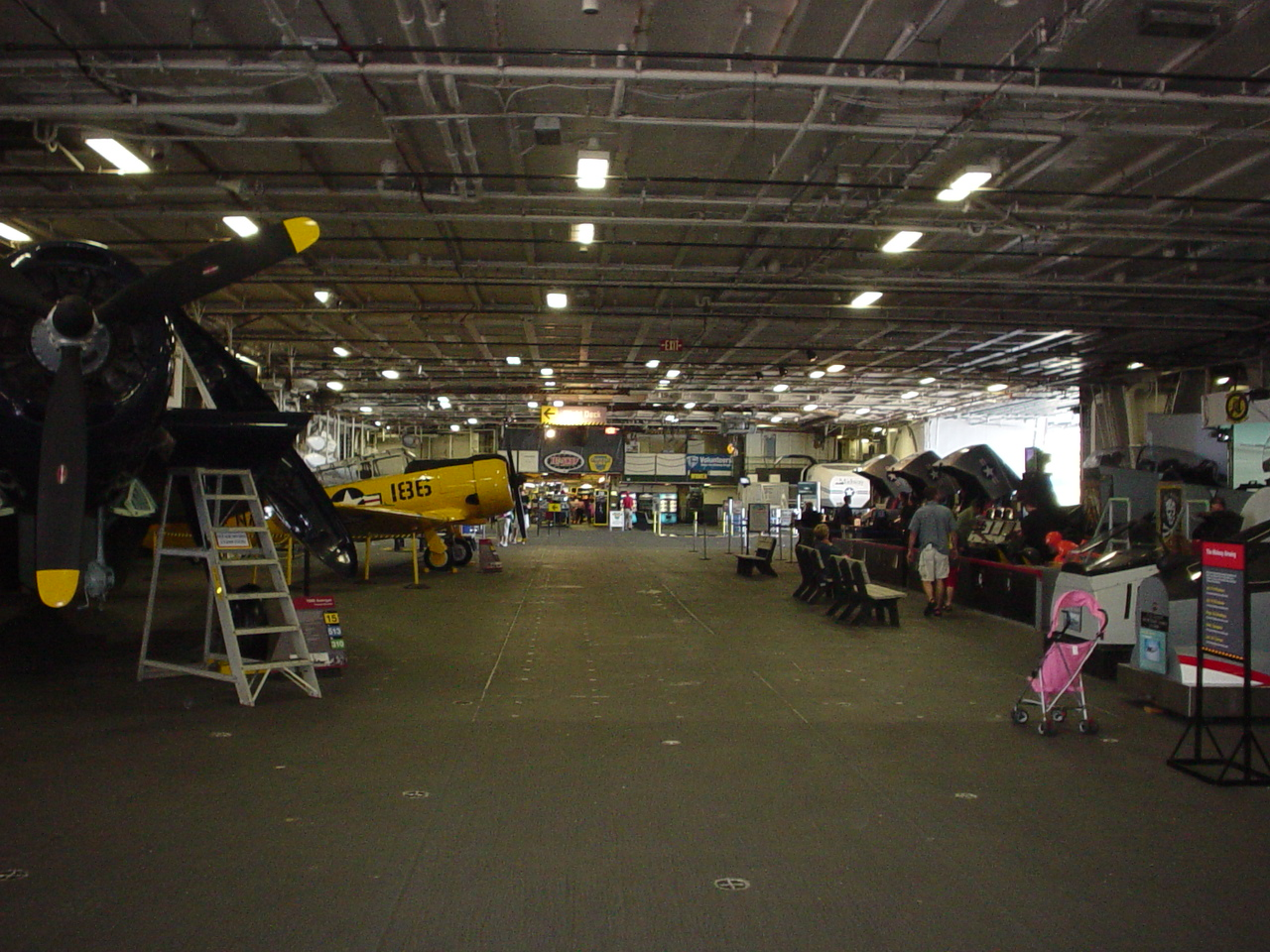
Main exhibit area of Midway on the hangar deck

The USS Midway Museum is a historical naval aircraft carrier museum in San Diego, California, United States, located at Navy Pier in San Diego Bay. The museum consists of the aircraft carrier Midway. The ship houses an extensive collection of aircraft, many of which were built in Southern California.

== History ==
The USS Midway was the United States' longest-serving aircraft carrier of the 20th century, from 1945 to 1992. Approximately 200,000 sailors served aboard the carrier, known for several naval aviation breakthroughs as well as several humanitarian missions. It was the only carrier to serve the entire length of the Cold War and beyond. It is currently a museum ship in San Diego, California.

In February 2001, a restoration facility was established in Hangar 805 at Naval Air Station North Island.

Midway opened as a museum on June 7, 2004. By 2012 annual visitation exceeded 1 million visitors. As of 2015 Midway is the most popular naval warship museum in the United States. The museum has over 13,000 members, and hosts more than 700 events a year, including more than 400 active-duty Navy retirements, re-enlistments, and changes of command. The museum also hosts approximately 50,000 students on field trips and 5,000 children in its overnight program annually.

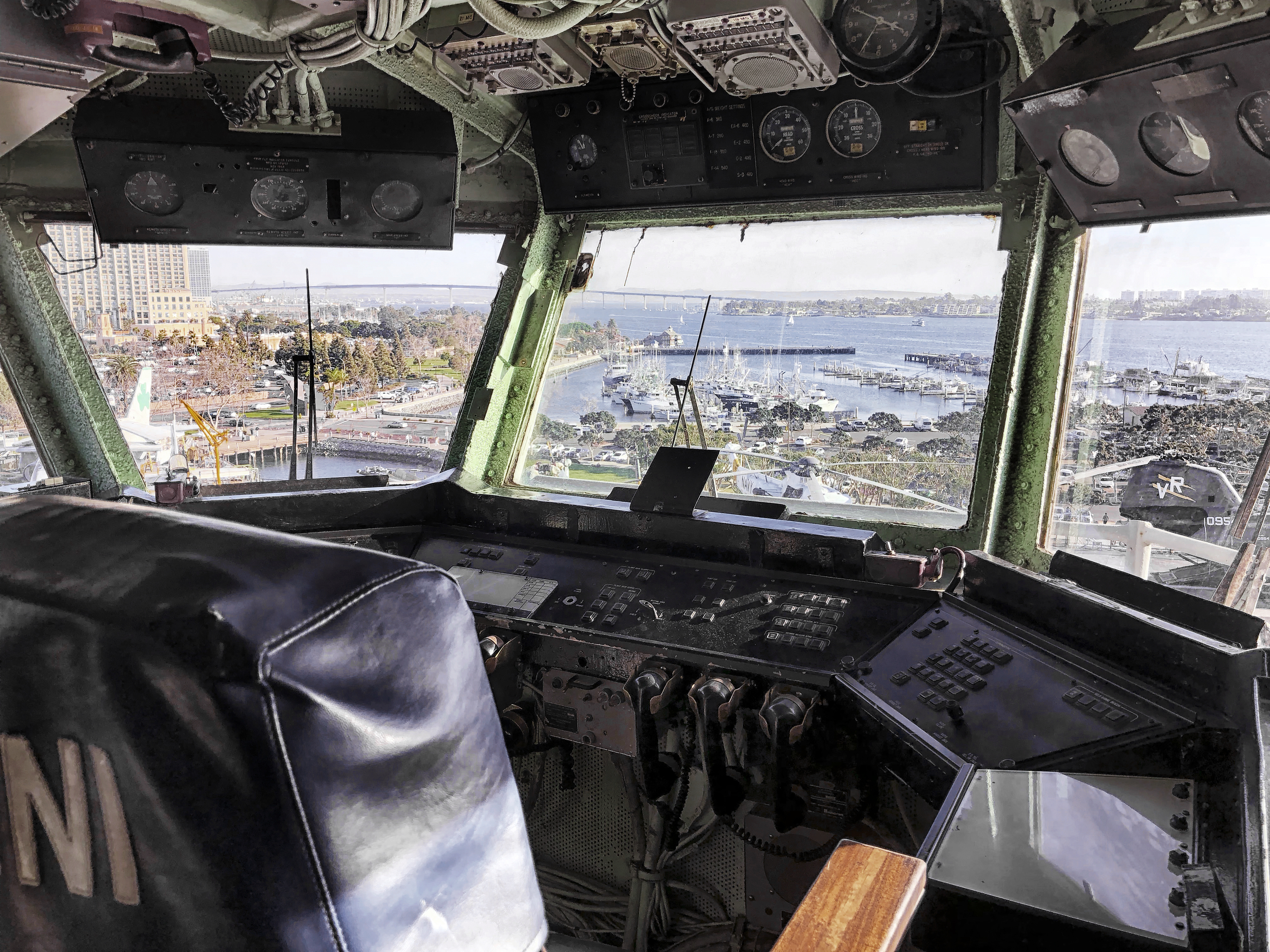
Midway Tower

Admission includes a self-guided audio tour, narrated by former Midway Sailors to more than 60 locations, including sleeping quarters, engine room, galley, bridge, brig, post office, fo'c'sle, pilots' ready rooms, officers quarters, primary flight control, Carrier Intelligence Center (CVIC), and "officers country". Other features include climb-aboard aircraft and cockpits, videos, flight simulators, and a narrated audio tour for youngsters.

Membership has grown to more than 25,000. A high definition, holographic movie theater, "The Battle of Midway Theater", was added in 2017, and in 2019 the museum added a virtual reality flight simulator ride in addition to its existing four flight simulators. The GI Film Festival and the San Diego International Film Festival have scheduled screenings at the museum.

A Grumman C-2 Greyhound was craned aboard the carrier in June 2023.

On 18 July 2025, a private 60-foot (18 m) sportfishing boat collided with Midway at slow speed. There were no injuries, or significant damage, and the captain of the vessel was later arrested on suspicion of boating while under the influence.

== Pier update ==
The McGarth Family Foundation's donation of US$10 million to the USS Midway Museum was the largest donation to date, helping begin construction on a renovation of the naval pier. The project was projected to cost US$46 million originally, but as of two years ago the cost is expected to be US$77 million.

=== Donation history ===
The reason for the donation goes back to World War II when Director Laurie McGarth's late father served in the war as a naval engineer in San Diego Bay. He was then later discharged and became the largest engineer contractor for Southern California from 1970 to 1980. Director Laurie believes by this donation she will be honoring her late father's legacy by maintaining a part of San Diego's history and rebuilding the breaking down naval pier.

=== Projected finish ===
The project is set to be finished by 2028 with a rundown building being set for demolition and clean up in 2027. Once finished, there is expected to be a new pier with park amenities such as parking, play places, parades, and possible new exhibits dedicated to US Navy Seals.

== Exhibits and collection ==
=== Aircraft ===
==== Bombers/attack ====
- Curtiss SB2C Helldiver
- Douglas A-1 Skyraider
- Douglas A-3 Skywarrior
- Douglas A-4 Skyhawk
- Douglas SBD Dauntless
- Douglas TBD Devastator (replica)
- Grumman A-6 Intruder
- Grumman TBM Avenger
- LTV A-7 Corsair II
- Northrop Grumman EA-6B Prowler

==== Fighters ====
- Grumman F4F Wildcat
- Grumman F9F Panther
- Grumman F-11 Tiger
- North American FJ-2/-3 Fury
- Vought F4U Corsair
- Vought F7U Cutlass
- Vought F-8 Crusader

==== Multirole ====
- Grumman F-9 Cougar
- Grumman F-14 Tomcat
- McDonnell Douglas F-4 Phantom II
- McDonnell Douglas F/A-18 Hornet

==== Helicopters ====
- Bell UH-1 Iroquois gunship
- Boeing Vertol CH-46 Sea Knight
- Kaman SH-2 Seasprite
- Piasecki HUP Retriever
- Sikorsky HO3S
- Sikorsky H-34 Seabat
- Sikorsky SH-3 Sea King
- Sikorsky SH-60 Seahawk

==== Reconnaissance and surveillance ====
- Lockheed S-3 Viking
- North American A-5 Vigilante
- Northrop Grumman E-2 Hawkeye

==== Trainers ====
- North American T-2 Buckeye
- North American T-6 Texan

==== Transport/Utility ====
- Cessna O-1 Bird Dog
- Grumman C-1 Trader
- Grumman C-2 Greyhound

=== Voices of Midway (2015) ===
Voices of Midway is a 2015 short film directed by Scott Levitta and written by Richard Christian Matheson. The film is based on true events at the Battle of Midway on 4 June 1942 and plays continuously at the Battle of Midway Theater.

=== New exhibit for naval Intelligence (2025) ===
In June 2025, the USS Midway Museum opened a new exhibit titled "Top Secret: Inside the High-Stakes World of Naval Intelligence." Located in the ship's restored Carrier Intelligence Center (CVIC), the space was previously restricted due to the classified nature of its operations. Developed under the direction of museum president and CEO Terry Kraft, the exhibit covers the role of naval intelligence during operations Desert Shield and Desert Storm.

“I took over the Midway museum in 2023 and thought about spaces that were important to me when I served on Midway. I did two deployments on Midway. I flew forward to combat missions from Desert Storm,” Kraft said.

The USS Midway's carrier Intelligence Center or CVIC once served as the backbone and nerves to naval intelligence during Operation Desert storm and shield in the 90s. The museum hopes to honor its intelligence officers with this new exhibit.

== Events ==
In addition to private events, the museum has hosted several events, including a nationally broadcast NCAA basketball game between San Diego State University and Syracuse University in 2012. American Idol has filmed an episode on Midway, as have the Travel Channel, Discovery Channel, FOX News, The Bachelor, Extreme Makeover, History Channel, and Military Channel. The nationally televised annual "Battle on the Midway" collegiate wrestling showcase has been staged each November on the flight deck of the museum since 2017.

The USS Midway Museum has had the opportunity to host various high-profile events and productions throughout its lifetime. In 2018 and 2019, scenes from the critically acclaimed film Top Gun: Maverick were filmed on the museum premises. Additionally, planes featured in the movie, such as the F/A-18 Hornet Jet, are displayed at the museum now that filming has concluded. Moreover, the USS Midway Museum hosted the global premiere of the film on 4 May 2022.

=== Memorial services ===
On every anniversary of the September 11 attacks, the USS Midway Museum hosts a memorial service to remember the lives lost during the incident. This is in conjunction with the FDNY retirees of San Diego, San Diego Fire & Rescue Department, National City FD, SDFF Emerald Society and the Wounded Warrior Project. During the ceremony, the names of all the first responders that have died during 9/11 are read out loud. The service takes place on the flight deck, where hundreds of people gather each year.

== See also ==
- U.S. Navy museums (and other aircraft carrier museums)
- National Naval Aviation Museum
- San Diego Air & Space Museum – Another air museum in San Diego located at Balboa Park
