= VRC-30 =

Logistics aircraft squadron of the US Navy

Fleet Logistics Support Squadron 30
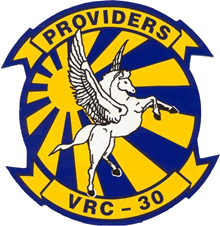
- VRC-30 Insignia
- Active: 24 June 1943 – 8 December 2023 (planned)
- Country: United States
- Branch: United States Navy
- Garrison/HQ: NAS North Island
- Nickname: "Providers"

Aircraft flown
- Transport: Grumman C-2 Greyhound

Fleet Logistics Support Squadron 30 (VRC-30) was a United States Navy aviation unit responsible for carrier onboard delivery (COD) operations. Nicknamed the "Providers", the squadron was based at Naval Air Station North Island, California. Unlike most other Navy squadrons, VRC-30 operated through five separately designated detachments, each assigned to different carrier air wings.

== History ==
VRC-30 was originally established as Air Transport Squadron 5 (VR-5) on 24 June 1943 at Naval Air Station Seattle. The squadron was operated the Douglas R4D Skytrain, Douglas R5D Skymaster, Beechcraft SNB Expeditor, and the Noorduyn JA-1 Norseman in regular service to Seattle, Washington, Oakland, California, San Francisco, the Aleutian Islands, Fairbanks, Alaska, and Point Barrow, Alaska.

In 1948, the Naval Air Transportation Service and Air Transport Command of the United States Air Force merged and became the Military Air Transport Service (MATS). VR-5 was placed under the command of the newly formed MATS and assigned to the U.S. Pacific Fleet.

=== 1950s ===
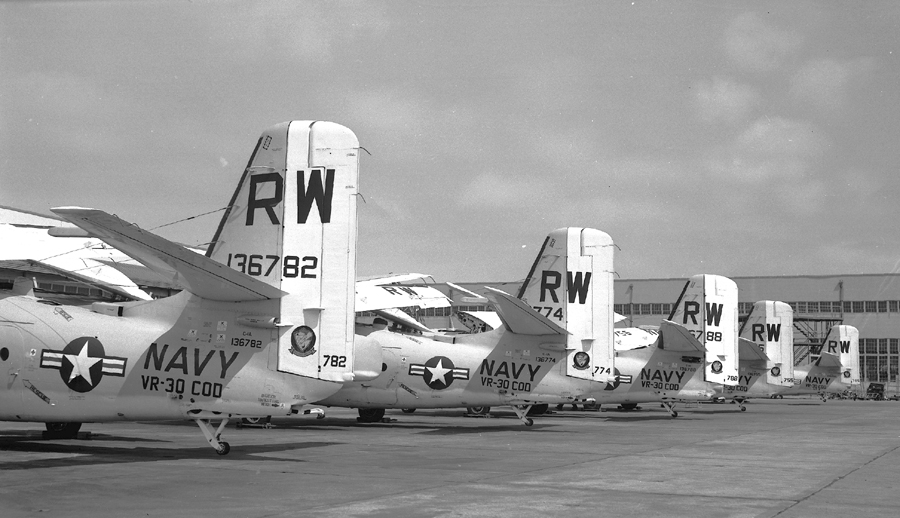
C-1A Traders of VR-30 in 1974

In 1950, VR-5 moved its base of operations from NAS Seattle to Naval Air Station Moffett Field, California. Detachments were established in Seattle and at Naval Air Station North Island, California. VR-5 was decommissioned on 15 July 1957 and became VR-21, with detachments at Naval Air Facility Atsugi, Japan and NAS North Island.

VR-21 was the first squadron to fly dedicated carrier onboard delivery (COD) aircraft, the Grumman TBM-3R Avenger. On 26 June 1958, the VR-21 NAS North Island Detachment was equipped with the Grumman C-1A Trader. The detachment relocated to NAS Alameda in 1960. The squadron also operated the Douglas C-118B Liftmaster from Naval Air Station Barbers Point, Hawaii, into the early 1970s.

=== 1960s and 1970s ===
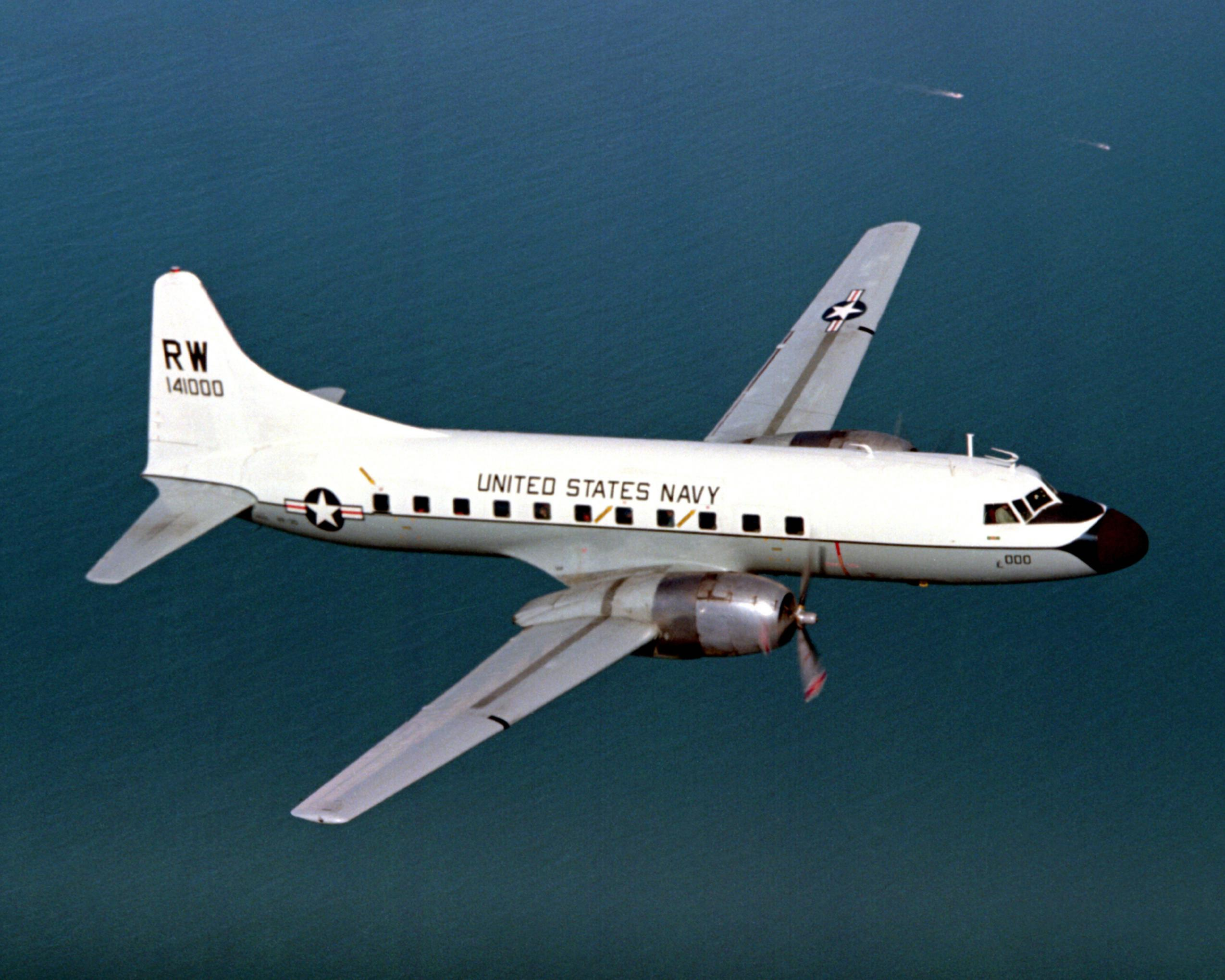
A C-131F Samaritan of VR-30.

On 1 October 1966 VR-21 was decommissioned. The Atsugi detachment was redesignated VRC-50, and the Alameda Detachment was redesignated VR-30, equipped with Convair C-131 Samaritan and C-1A Trader aircraft. On 9 November 1966, VR-30 made their first landing in the C-1A aboard the aircraft carrier USS Bon Homme Richard. The squadron was awarded the Meritorious Unit Commendation for exemplary service from 1 January to 30 November 1967. From 1968 to 1973, VR-30 COD detachments also operated aboard various carriers in support of recovery operations for Apollo 10, 11, 12, and 16.

In 1969, squadron C-1As and crews operated from Danang, Vietnam, in support of the U.S. Navy's Task Force 77, the carrier strike force operating in the Gulf of Tonkin during the Vietnam War. In 1971, VR-30 received its first jet aircraft with two North American CT-39 Saberliner for executive airlift. In May 1973 the squadron received the first of four McDonnell Douglas C-9B Skytrain II.

On 12 March 1974 the U.S. Navy's first female aviator, Lieutenant (Junior Grade) Barbara A. Allen reported for duty. After relocating to NAS North Island, VR-30 was decommissioned on 1 October 1978 and VRC-30 was concurrently commissioned.

=== 1980s ===
In February 1980, VRC-30 was also tasked with training aviators on the Beechcraft C-12 Huron. IN late 1985, VRC-30 retired the 6 C-1A Trader and transitioned to the Grumman C-2A Greyhound by accepting deliveries of five C-2A Greyhounds. These were later replaced by newer C-2A(R).

=== 1990s ===
In 1994 VRC-30 became the sole United States Pacific Fleet COD squadron as VRC-50 was decommissioned and its personnel and aircraft were transferred to VRC-30. VRC-30 Detachment 5 was established in August 1994 at Naval Air Facility Atsugi, Japan as part of Carrier Air Wing Five. Four other detachments were formed at NAS North Island, supported by a shore component. In 1997 VRC-30 Detachment 1 earned the Golden Hook Award for the best landing grades in the air wing aboard Abraham Lincoln. Detachment 2 supported U.S. Navy carrier operations aboard USS Carl Vinson during Operation Desert Fox and Operation Southern Watch. In the calendar year 1998, VRC-30 made 1356 carrier landings, transported 14,360 passengers, 1,877,973 lbs (938.986,5 kg) of cargo, and had a sortie completion rate of 99.9%.

In December 1999, the squadron has achieved 24 years and over 149,600 hours of accident-free flight. VRC-30 was awarded the Chief of Naval Operations Safety Award six times between 1979 and 1992 and the Meritorious Unit Commendation for exemplary service from October 1993 to September 1994. In 1996 and 1998, VRC-30 received the Battle Efficiency Award.

=== 2000s ===
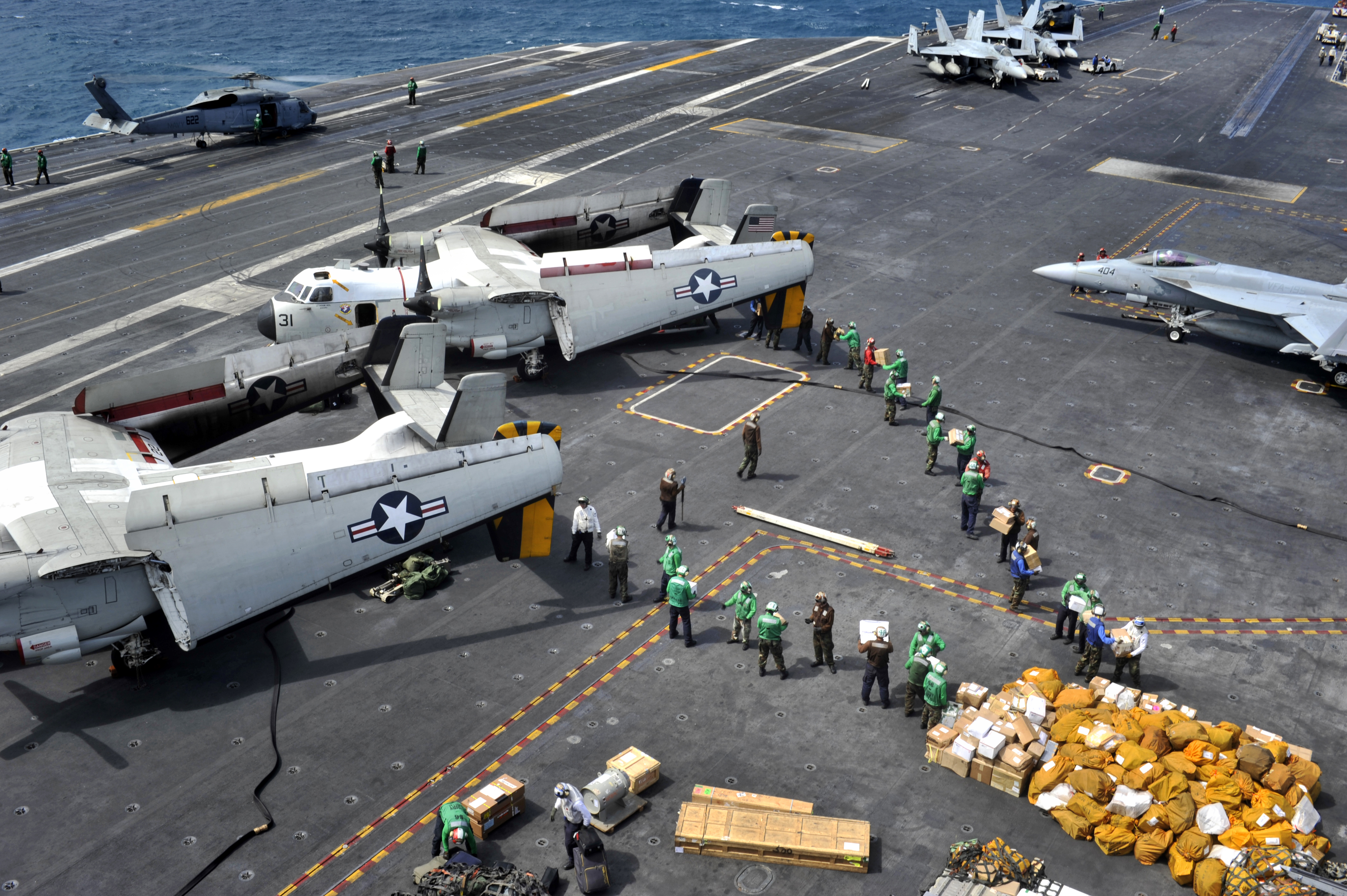
C-2As are unloaded aboard USS George Washington in 2011.

The squadron supported Operation Iraqi Freedom and Operation Enduring Freedom and also earned the Battle Efficiency Award in 2002 and 2003. In 2004 VRC-30 ended the C-12 operations.

The years to follow saw several major developments and upgrades in the C-2A, beginning with the critical Service Life Extension Program (SLEP) in 2006. The SLEP increased the airframe lifespan from 10,000 flight hours or 15,000 carrier landings to 15,000 flight hours or 36,000 carrier landings. The program allowed the aircraft to operate until 2027. The SLEP was followed by an aircraft rewire in 2008, and the "LOT 4" upgrade in August 2010. The LOT 4 upgrade, completed in September 2012, provided pilots with a new glass cockpit and the eight-bladed NP2000 propeller system, which increased performance, reduced airframe vibration, and improved maintainability. During this period, VRC-30 earned five more Battle Efficiency awards in 2005, 2006, 2007, 2011 and 2012.

On 22 November 2017 a VRC-30 Detachment 5 C-2A carrying 11 passengers and crew crashed into the Philippine Sea 90.1 miles (145 km) Northwest of Okinotorishima while flying from Marine Corps Air Station Iwakuni to USS Ronald Reagan. 8 people were recovered but 3 were not found. It was the first loss of a C-2 since 2005, and the first fatal accident of VRC-30 since 1973. The aircraft was located at a depth of 18,500ft (5,640 meters) in the last week of December 2017, when a salvage ship used a pinger receiver to locate the aircraft's emergency signal.

With the retirement of the C-2A Greyhound, VRC-30 Det.5 at Marine Corps Air Station Iwakuni, Japan, was assigned to VRC-40 on 30 September 2023. The final flight of a C-2A Greyhound of VRC-30 took place on 20 September 2023 and the squadron was deactivated on 8 December 2023.

== Detachments ==
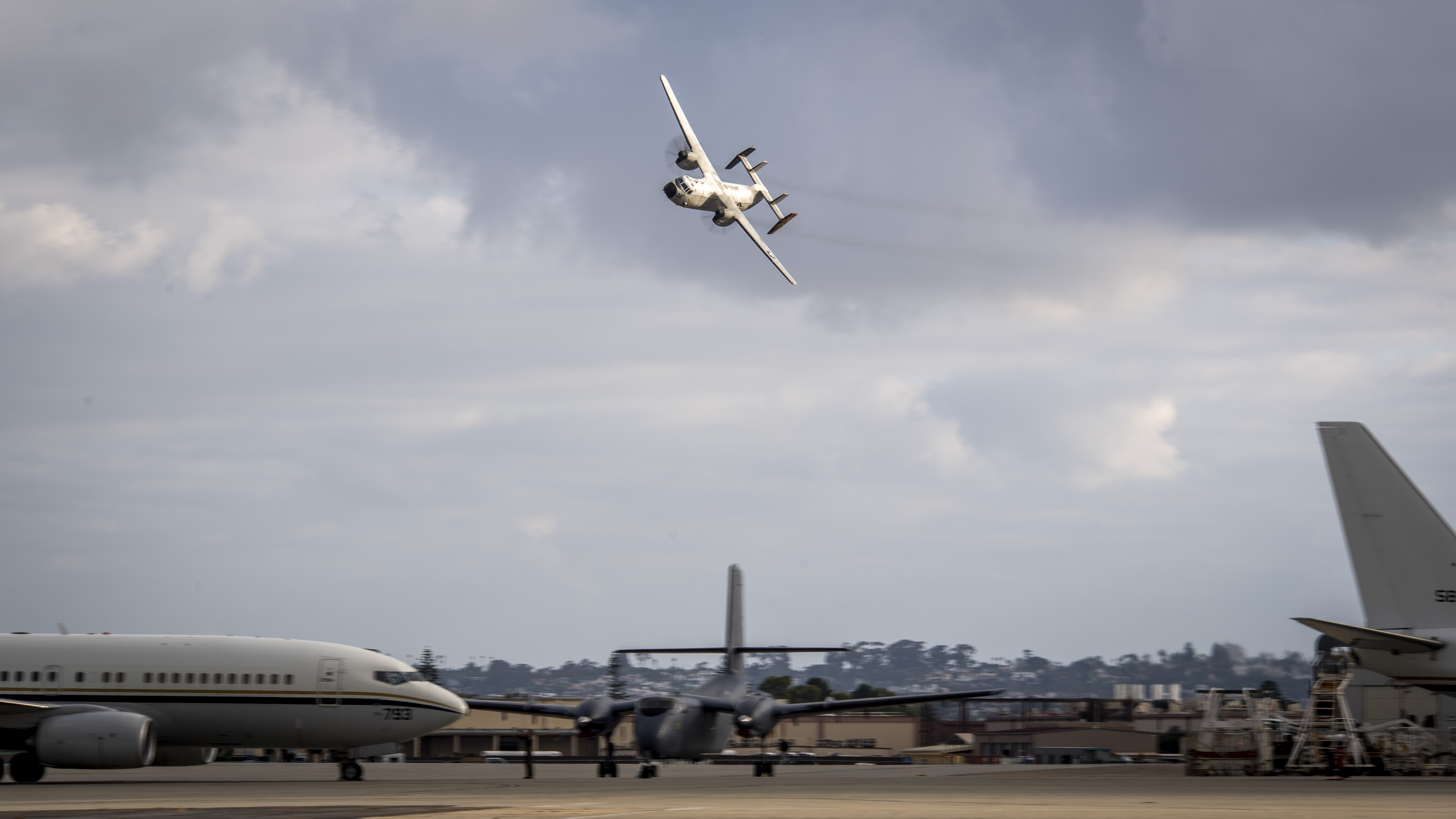
Final flight of VRC-30, 20 September 2023.

Detachment 1
Detachment 2
Detachment 3
Detachment 4
Detachment 5

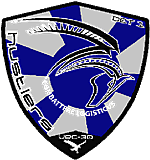
Hustlers

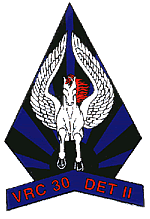
Roughnecks

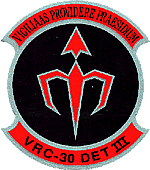
Crusaders

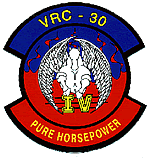
Pure Horsepower

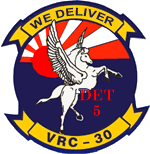
We Deliver

== See also ==
- History of the United States Navy
- List of United States Navy aircraft squadrons
