= Carrier onboard delivery =

Air transport between an aircraft carrier and land bases

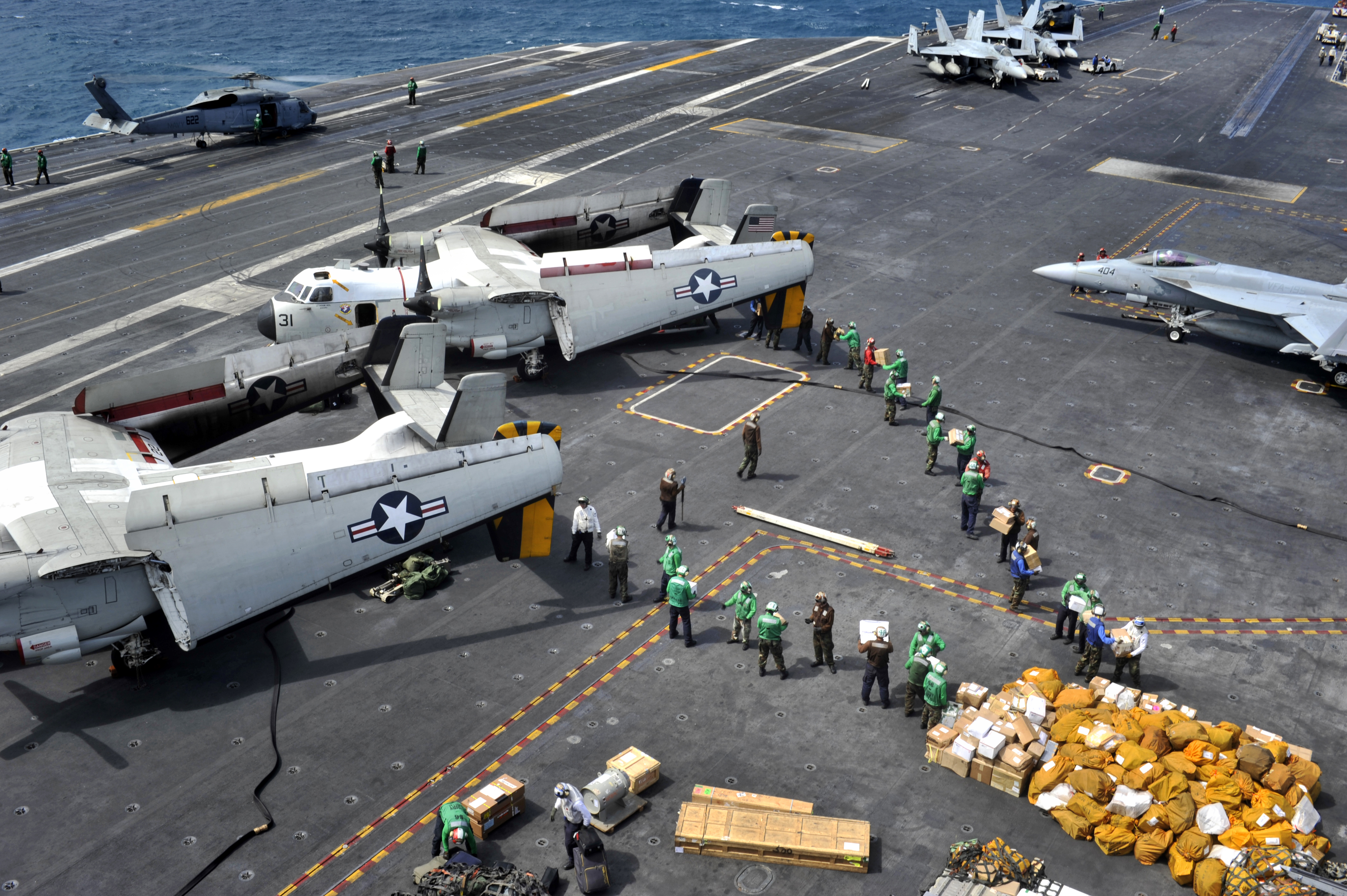
USS George Washington (CVN-73) crew unload mail from two C-2A Greyhounds in 2011

Carrier onboard delivery (COD) is the use of carrier-based aircraft to transport personnel, mail, supplies and high-priority cargo such as replacement parts, from shore bases to an aircraft carrier at sea. Several types of aircraft, including utility helicopters and tiltrotor aircraft, have been used by navies in the COD role. The Grumman C-2 Greyhound has been the United States Navy's primary fixed-wing aircraft for COD operations since the mid-1960s.

== History ==
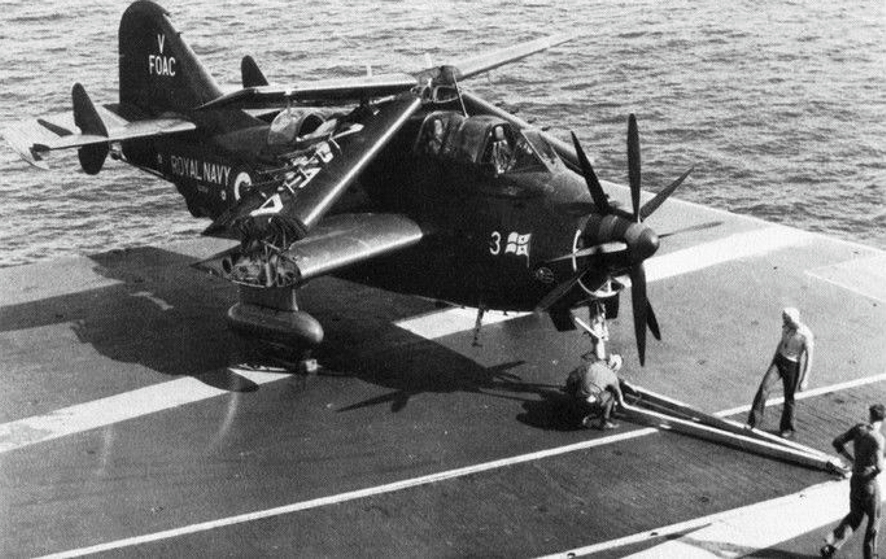
A Gannet COD.4 from HMS Victorious (R38) aboard USS Bennington in 1965

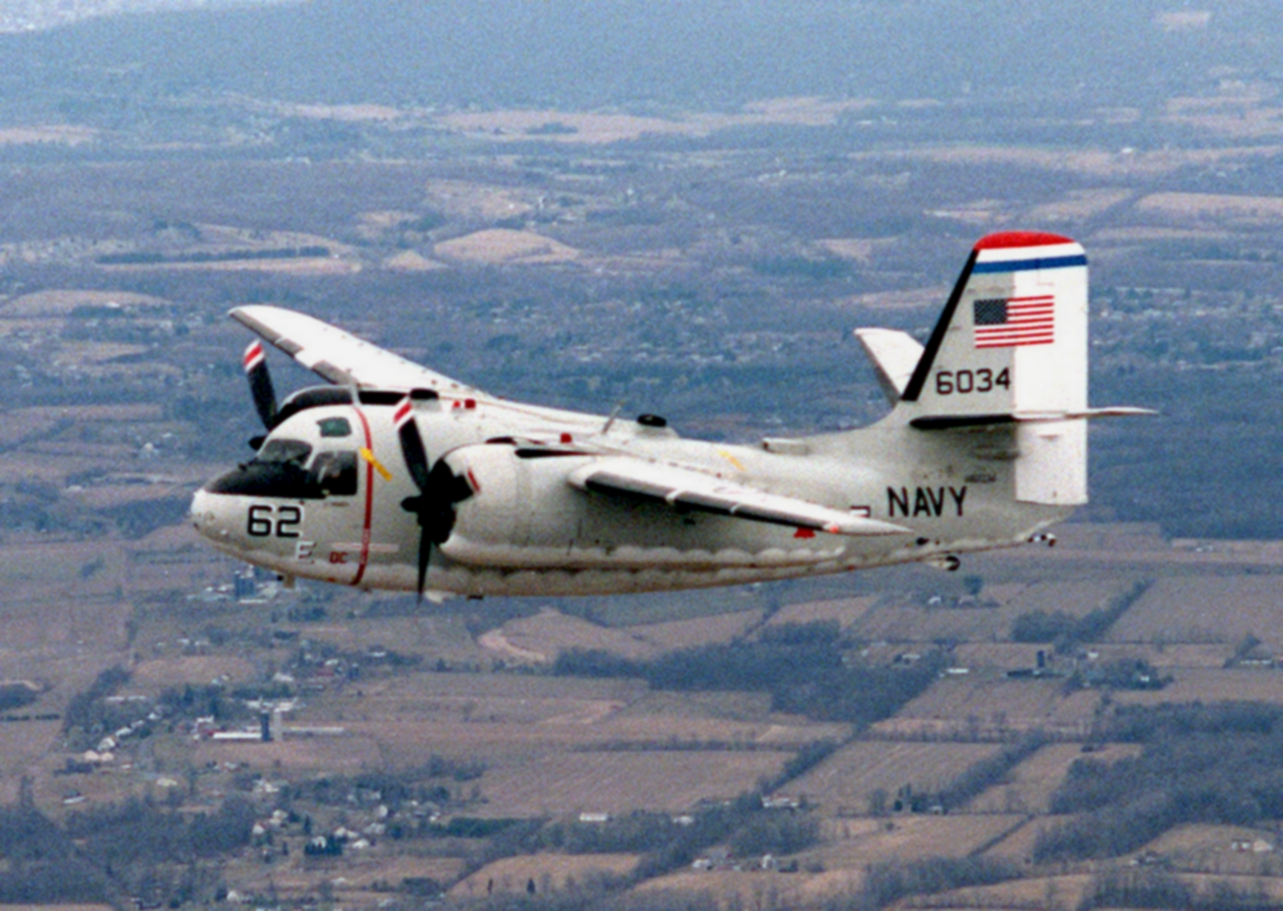
A C-1A Trader in 1987

US-3A of VRC-50 in 1987

Early United States Navy (USN) recognition of need for a cargo plane capable of carrier landings resulted in airframe conversion of Grumman TBM-3 Avenger torpedo bombers to unarmed seven-passenger COD aircraft designated TBM-3R. Replacement of TBM-3Rs began in the late 1950s. Grumman built a cargo variant of its twin-piston-engined Grumman S-2 Tracker anti-submarine warfare bomber as the C-1A Trader. (Contrary to popular belief, C-130 Hercules was not tested for COD.) In the late 1960s Grumman began production of a cargo variant of its twin-turboprop E-2 Hawkeye Airborne Early Warning aircraft known as the C-2A Greyhound. Five Lockheed US-3A Viking aircraft were also used from the early 1980s to the mid-1990s. The C-2 has remained the U.S. Navy's primary COD vehicle since that time.

Several U.S. Navy "Fleet Logistics Support Squadrons" provided COD services aboard carriers since the World War II, including VR-5, VR-21, VR-22, VR-23, VR-24, VRC-30, VRC-40, and VRC-50. On 6 October 2012, a MV-22 tilt-rotor aircraft from squadron VMM-165 landed and refueled on board USS Nimitz (CVN-68). This operation was part of an evaluation of the feasibility of the MV-22 as a potential replacement for the current C-2 cargo transport aircraft. Further cargo handling trials took place in 2013 on Harry S. Truman.

In April 2014 Lockheed Martin announced that they would offer refurbished and remanufactured Lockheed S-3 Vikings as a replacement for the decades-old Northrop Grumman C-2A Greyhound on-board carrier delivery aircraft. Dubbed the C-3, the aircraft would have a wider fuselage, but would retain the original wings, tail assembly, engines and crew compartment. With an unrefueled range of 2,400 nautical miles (4,400 km; 2,800 mi) carrying a 10,000-pound (4,500 kg) load, Lockheed stated that the C-3 would have twice the range of a new C-2, and triple the range of a V-22 Osprey. Unlike other competitors, the C-3 could meet the critical requirement to transport replacement Pratt & Whitney jet engines for the F-35. The requirement for 35 aircraft would be met from the 91 S-3s currently in storage. In 2015, the Navy published a memorandum of understanding (MoU) for using 4 to 12 HV-22s as COD. On 3 February 2016, the future COD version was designated as the CMV-22B.

== List of COD aircraft ==
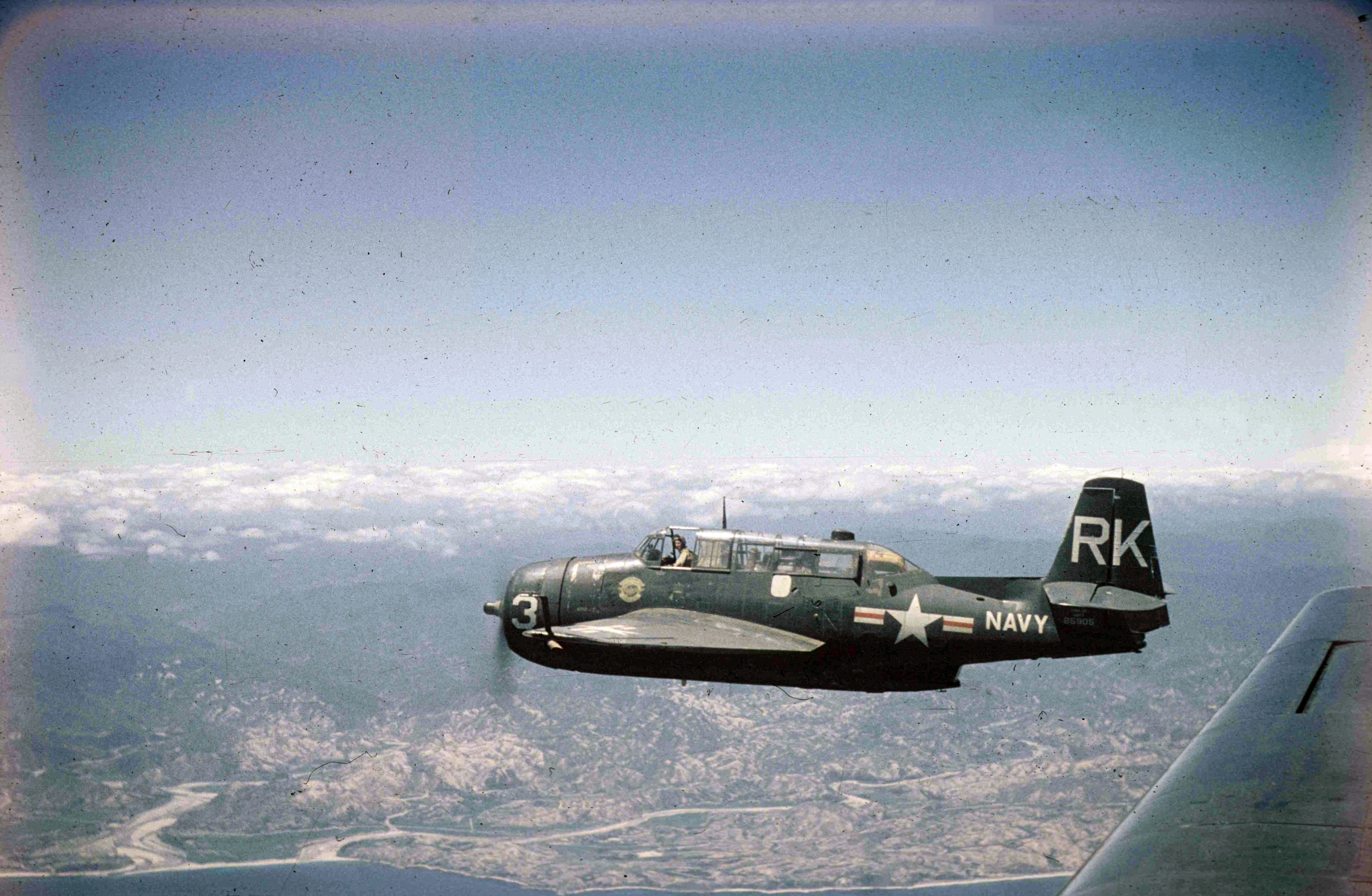
A TBM-3R COD plane in the early 1950s

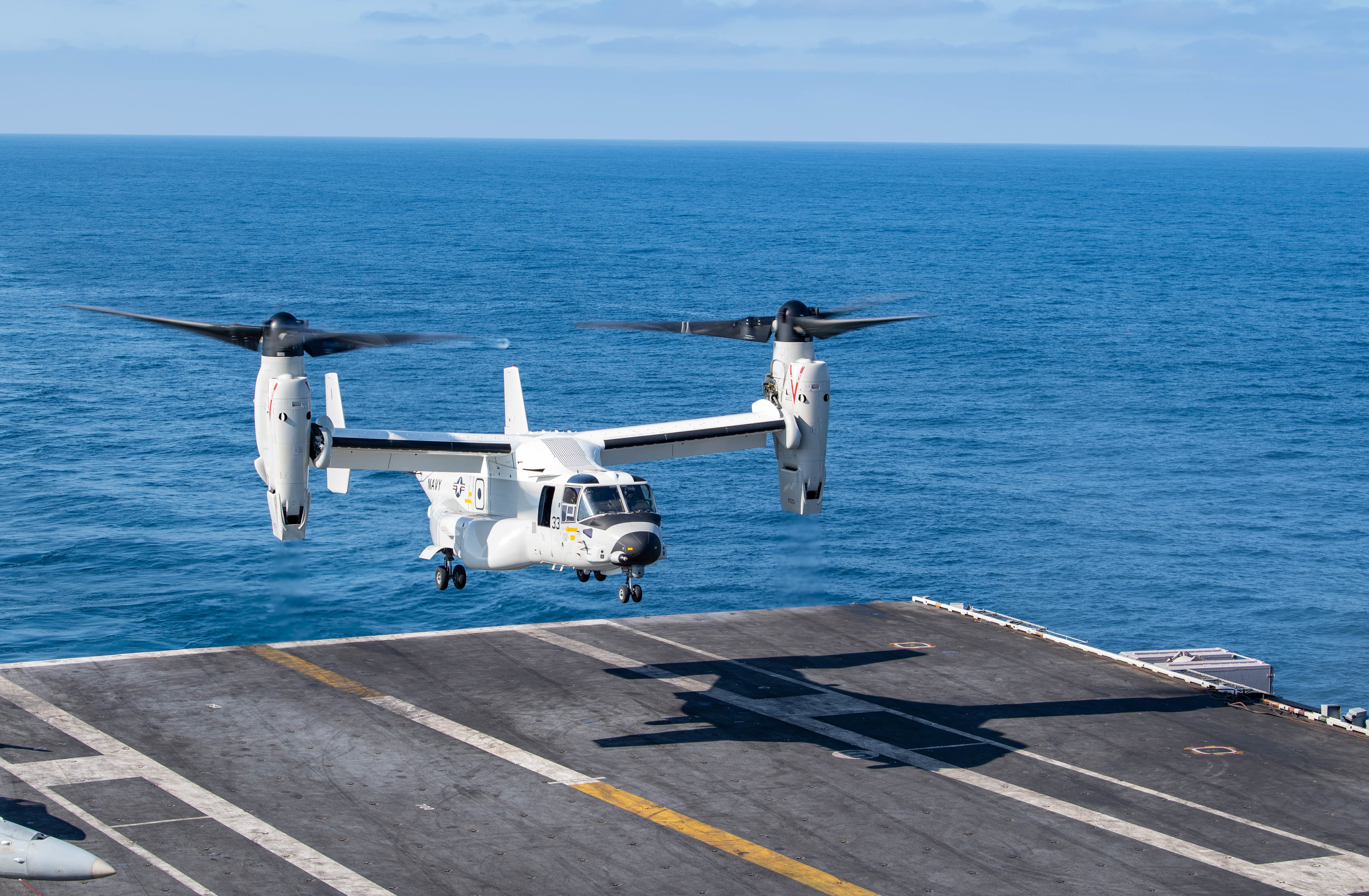
A CMV-22 Osprey landing on the aircraft carrier USS Nimitz

Several aircraft types have been specifically designed or modified for COD missions:

- Bell Boeing CMV-22B Osprey
- Agusta Westland AW609
- Fairey Gannet COD.4
- Grumman/General Motors TBM-3R Avenger
- Grumman TF/C-1 Trader
- Grumman C-2 Greyhound
- Lockheed US-3A Viking
- Xi'an KJ-600

== See also ==
- Military logistics
- Seabasing
- Sealift
- Underway replenishment
- Vertical replenishment (VERTREP)
