= VRC-50 =

United States Navy Fleet Logistics Support squadron

Fleet Logistics Squadron 50
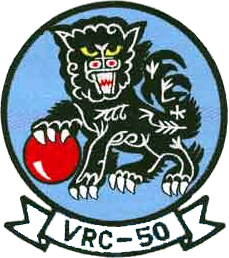
- Active: 1 October 1966 – 7 October 1994
- Country: United States
- Branch: United States Navy
- Role: Logistics
- Part of: Inactive
- Nickname: Foo Dogs

VRC-50 was a Fleet Logistics Squadron of the U.S. Navy. The squadron was established as Fleet Tactical Support Squadron 50 (VRC-50) on 1 October 1966, redesignated as Fleet Logistics Support Squadron Fifty (VRC-50) on 1 April 1976 and disestablished on 7 October 1994.

== Operational history ==
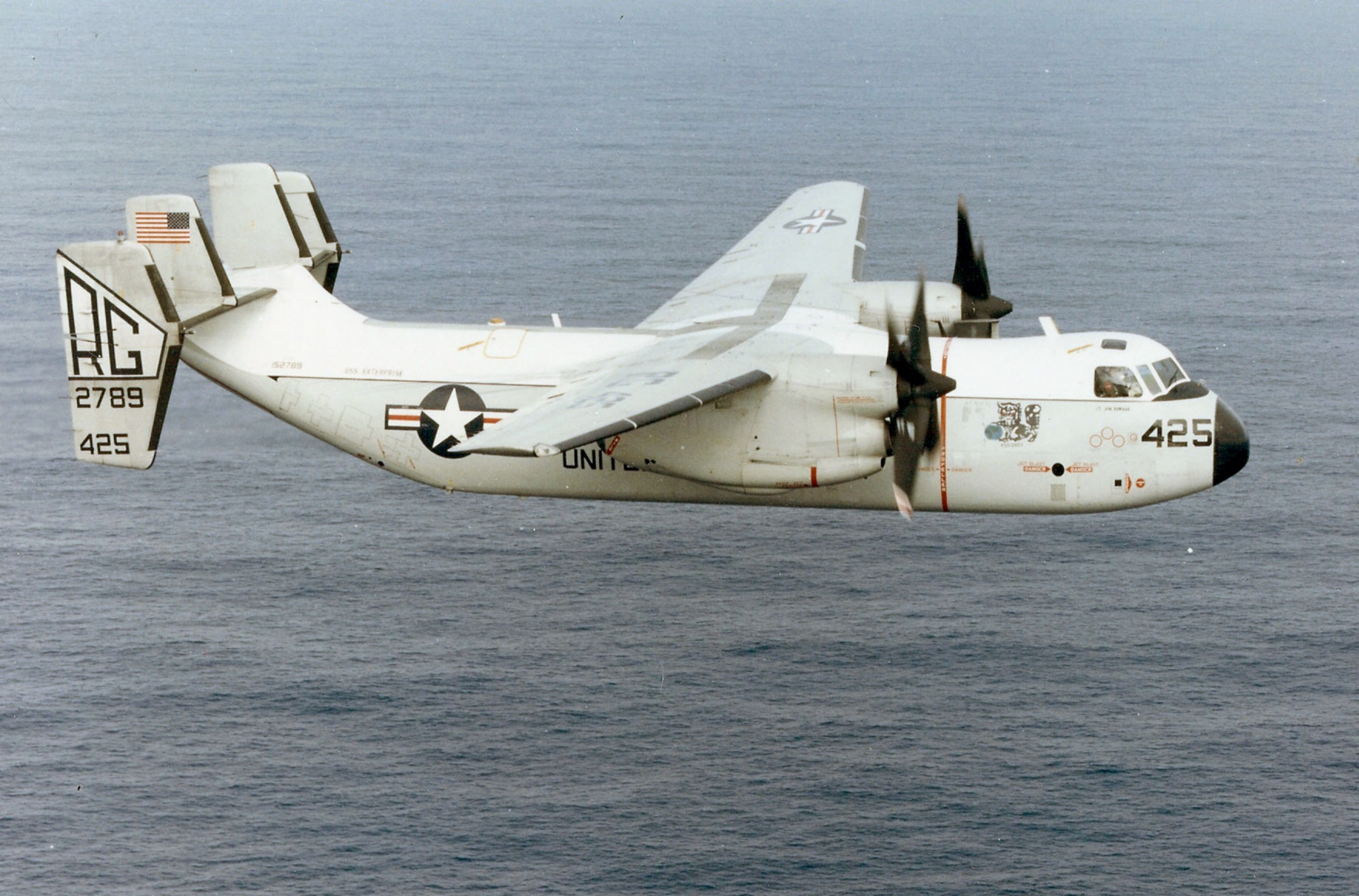
VRC-50 C-2A from USS Enterprise

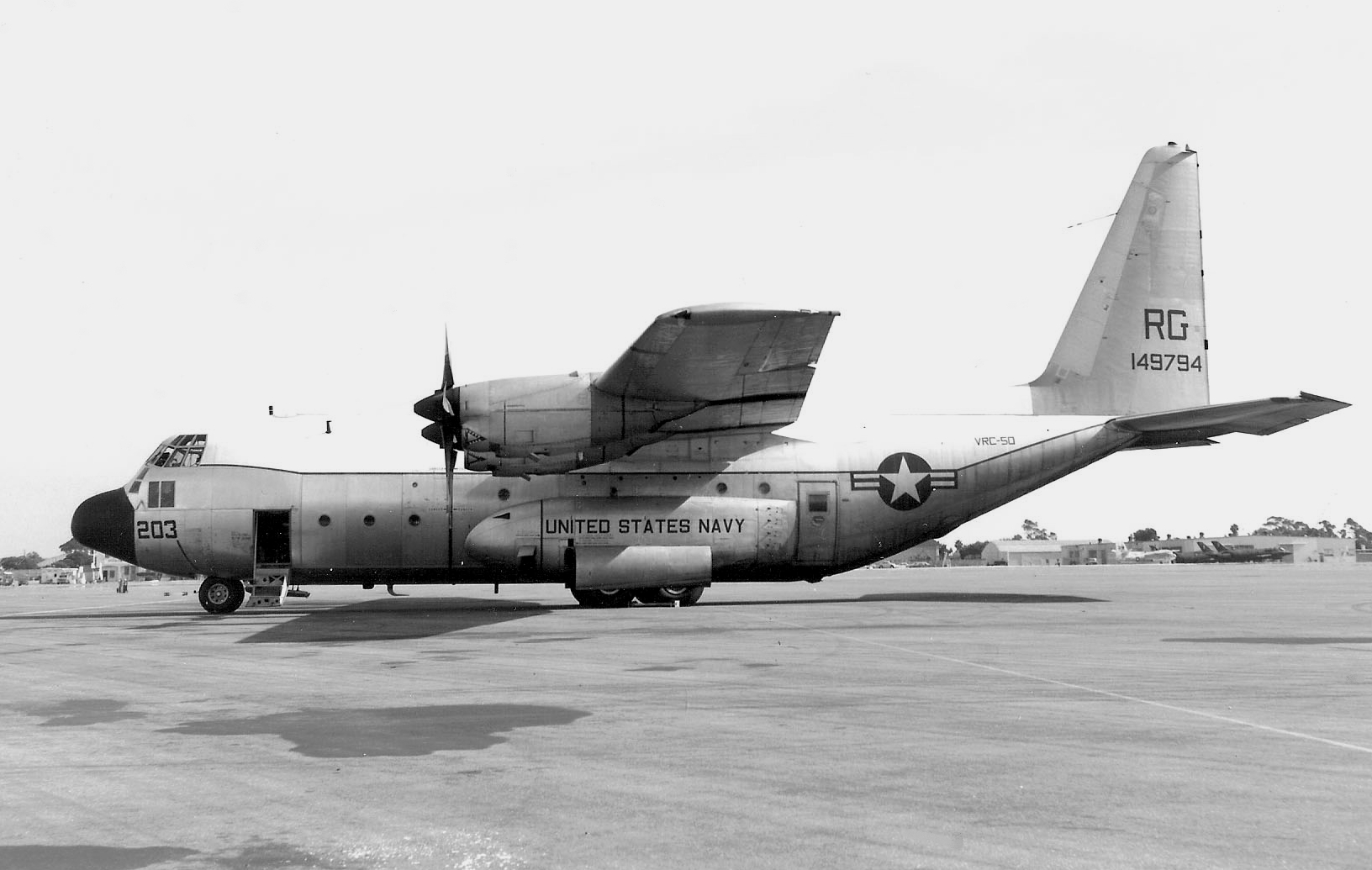
VRC-50 C-130F Hercules at NAS Atsugi

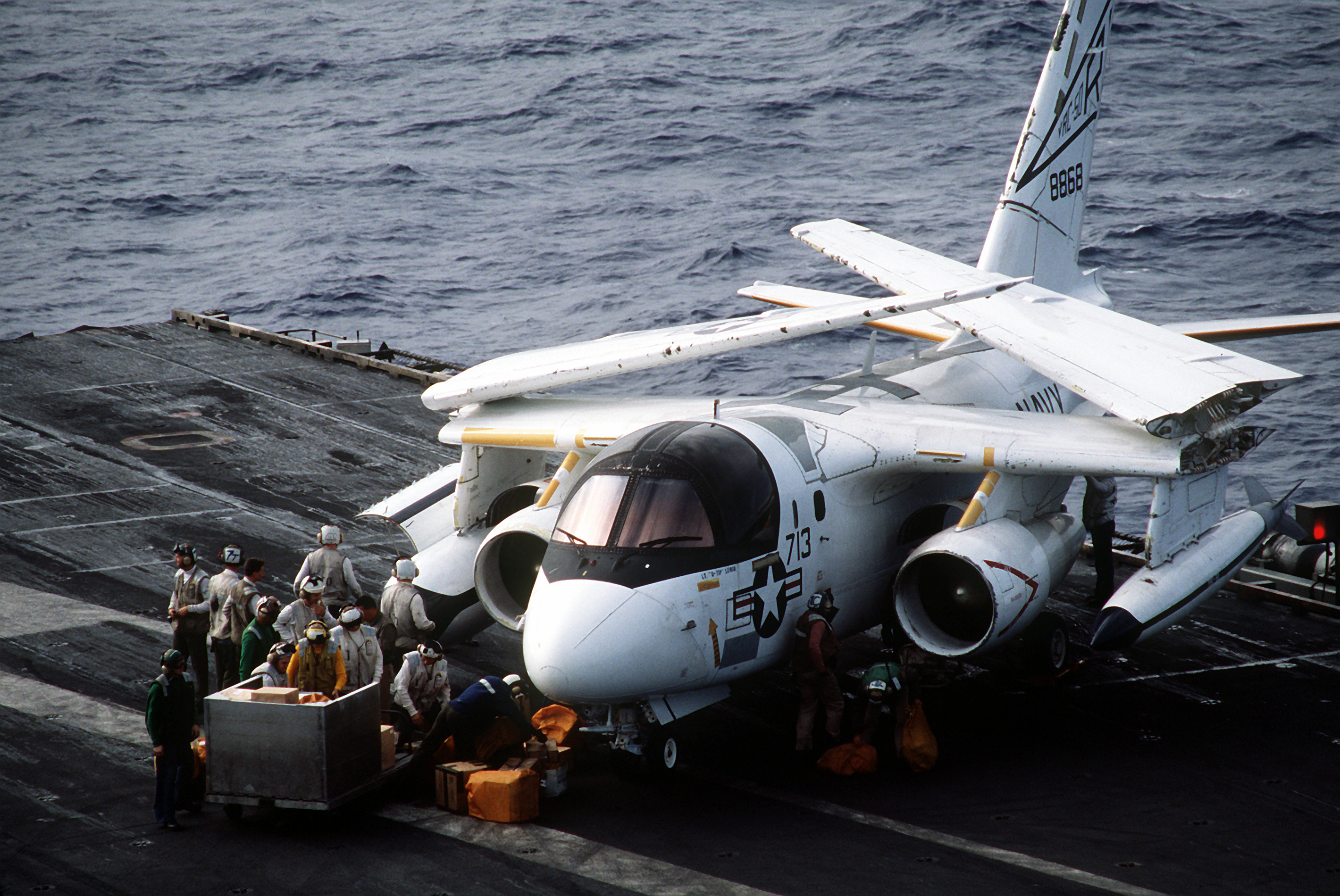
VRC-50 US-3A on USS Abraham Lincoln in 1993

- 2 October 1969, C-2A #152796 crashed on approach to the USS Constellation on a flight from NAS Cubi Point, all 26 passengers and crew were listed as killed in action, the bodies were not recovered.
- 15 December 1970, C-2A #155120 crashed shortly after launch from USS Ranger. 4 crewmen and five passengers were listed as missing in action and presumed dead. Bodies not recovered.
- 20 January 1989, US-3A #157996 crashed near Subic Bay, Philippines. Both crewmen, including the commanding officer were killed

== Home port assignments ==
The squadron was assigned to these home ports:

- NAS Atsugi
- NAS North Island
- NAS Cubi Point
- Andersen Air Force Base

== Aircraft assignment ==
- C-1 Trader
- R-5D Skymaster
- C-2 Greyhound
- CT-39 Sabreliner
- C-130F Hercules
- US-3A Viking

== See also ==
- List of inactive United States Navy aircraft squadrons
- History of the United States Navy
