= Grumman C-2 Greyhound =

U.S. military cargo aircraft (1966-2026)

C-2 Greyhound
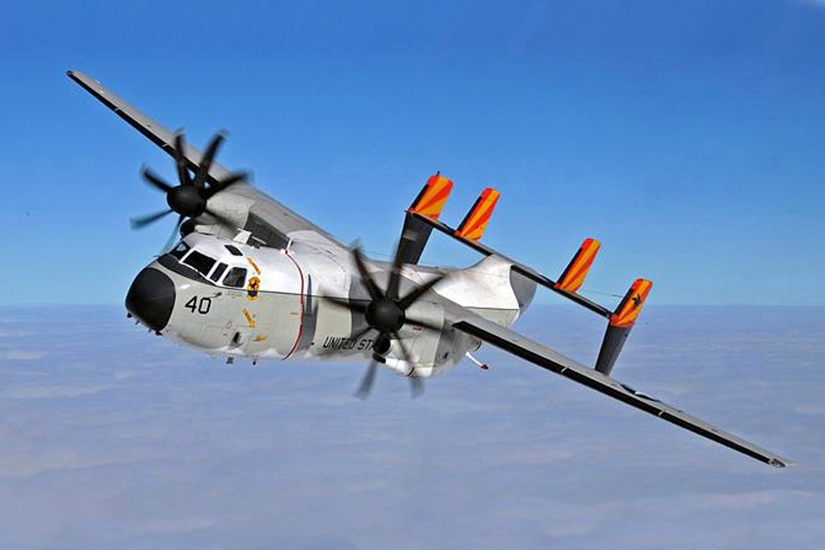
- A U.S. Navy C-2A(R) Greyhound of fleet logistics support squadron VRC-40 Rawhides

General information
- Type: Carrier-capable transport / Carrier onboard delivery
- National origin: United States
- Manufacturer: Grumman; Northrop Grumman
- Status: Retired
- Primary user: United States Navy
- Number built: C-2A: 17; C-2A(R): 39

History
- Manufactured: C-2A: 1965–1968; C-2A(R): 1985–1989
- Introduction date: 1966
- First flight: 18 November 1964
- Retired: 28 July 2026
- Developed from: Northrop Grumman E-2 Hawkeye

The Grumman C-2 Greyhound is a retired twin-engine, high-wing aircraft designed to carry supplies, mail and passengers to and from aircraft carriers of the United States Navy. Its primary mission was carrier onboard delivery (COD). The aircraft provided critical logistics support to carrier strike groups. The aircraft was mainly used for high-priority cargo such as jet engines and special stores, mail, and passengers between carriers and shore bases. Prototype C-2s first flew in 1964, and production followed the next year. The initial Greyhound aircraft were overhauled in 1973.

In 1984, more C-2As were ordered under designation Reprocured C-2A or C-2A(R). In 2010, all C-2A(R) aircraft received updated propellers (from four to eight blades) and navigational updates (glass cockpit). The U.S. Navy began replacing the remaining 27 C-2As with 44 Bell Boeing CMV-22Bs Osprey tiltrotors in 2020 and fully replaced the Greyhound for the COD mission in 2026.

== Design and development ==
=== Origins ===
The C-2 Greyhound, a derivative of the Northrop Grumman E-2 Hawkeye, shares the folding "Sto-Wings" and engines with the E-2, but has a widened fuselage with a rear loading ramp. The first of two prototypes flew in 1964. After successful testing, Grumman began production of the aircraft in 1965. The C-2 replaced the piston-engined Grumman C-1 Trader in the carrier onboard delivery (COD) role. The original C-2A aircraft were overhauled to extend their operational life in 1973.

Powered by two Allison T56 turboprop engines, the C-2A can deliver up to 10,000 pounds (4,500 kg) of cargo or up to 28 passengers, and is normally configured for a cargo/passenger mix. It can also carry litter patients in medical evacuation missions. A cage system or transport stand restrains cargo during carrier launch and landing accelerations to prevent weight redistribution, which might adversely affect in-flight stability. The large aft cargo ramp and door and a powered winch allow straight-in rear cargo loading and unloading for fast turnaround. The Greyhound's ability to airdrop supplies and personnel, fold its wings, and generate power for engine starting and other uses provide greater operational versatility. Some parts are shared with the E-2 Hawkeye and the Grumman A-6 Intruder to ease logistics support.

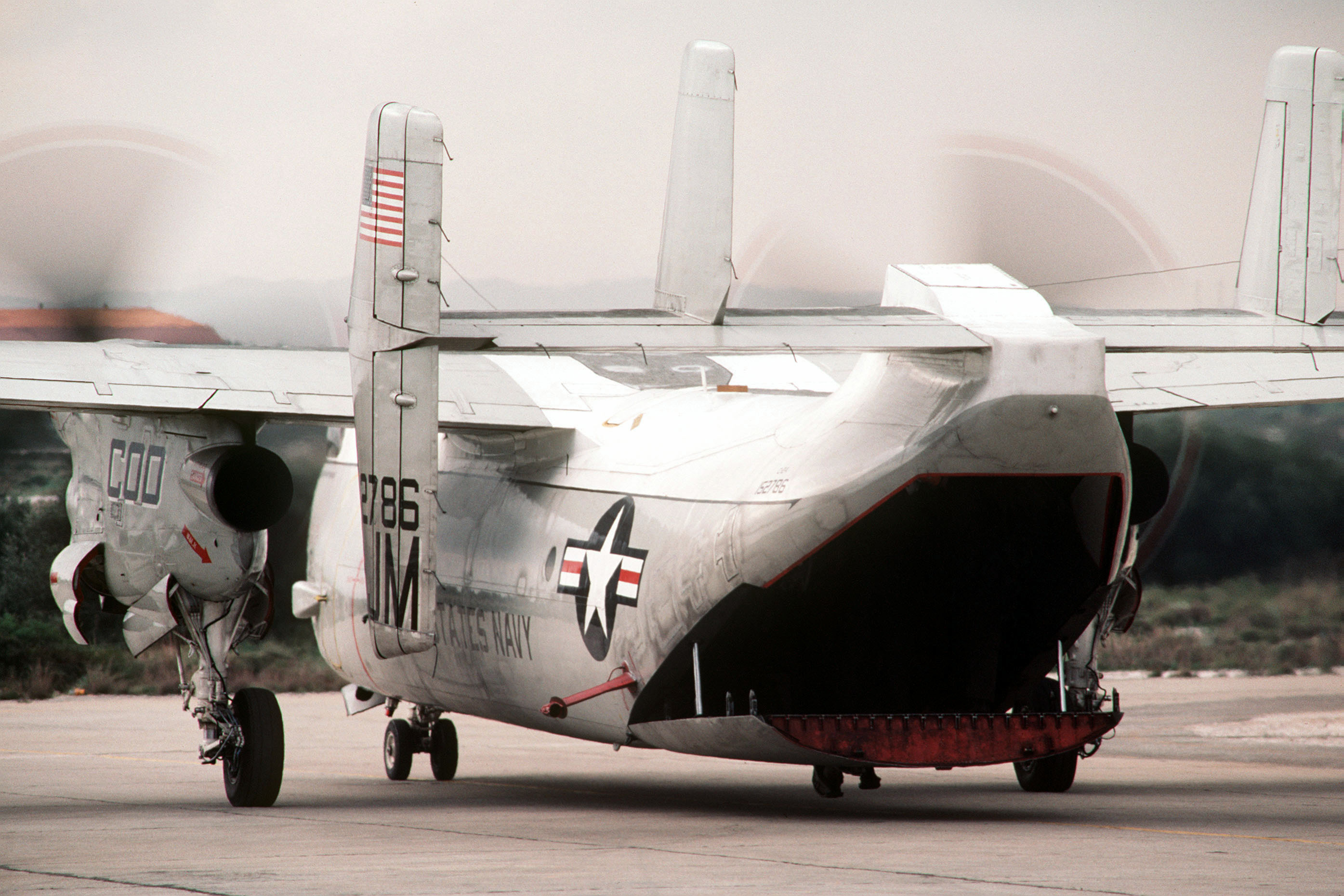
A C-2A taxis prior to takeoff on a flight to USS John F. Kennedy in February 1984. This was the first Greyhound delivered in 1966.

The C-2 has four vertical stabilizers with three of which are fitted with rudders. A single vertical stabilizer large enough for adequate directional control would have made the aircraft too tall to fit on an aircraft carrier hangar deck. The four-stabilizer configuration has the advantage of placing the outboard rudder surfaces directly in line with the propeller wash, providing effective yaw control down to low airspeeds, such as during takeoff and landing. The inner-left stabilizer lacks a rudder, and has been called the "executive tail", as it has nothing to do compared to the other three. A single C-2 (2797) was equipped with an air-to-air refueling probe, but this was not installed in other aircraft.

In 1984, the Navy ordered 39 new C-2A aircraft to replace older airframes. Dubbed the Reprocured C-2A or C-2A(R) due to the similarity to the original, the new aircraft has airframe improvements and better avionics. The older C-2As were phased out in 1987, and the last of the new models was delivered in 1990.

=== Upgrades ===
The 36 C-2A(R)s underwent a critical service life extension program (SLEP). The C-2A(R)'s lifespan was 10,000 hours, or 15,000 carrier landings; plans require the C-2A to perform its mission supporting battle group operational readiness through 2015. The lower landing limit was approaching for most airframes, and the SLEP will increase their projected life to 15,000 hours or 36,000 landings. Once complete, the SLEP will allow the 36 aircraft to operate until 2027. The SLEP includes structural improvements to the center wing, an eight-bladed NP2000 propeller, navigational upgrades including the addition of GPS and the dual CAINS II navigation system, the addition of crash-survivable flight-incident recorders, and a ground proximity warning system. The first upgraded C-2A(R) left NAVAIR Depot North Island on 12 September 2005, after sitting on the ground for three and a half years while the SLEP was developed and installed. All aircraft were to receive the SLEP by 2015.

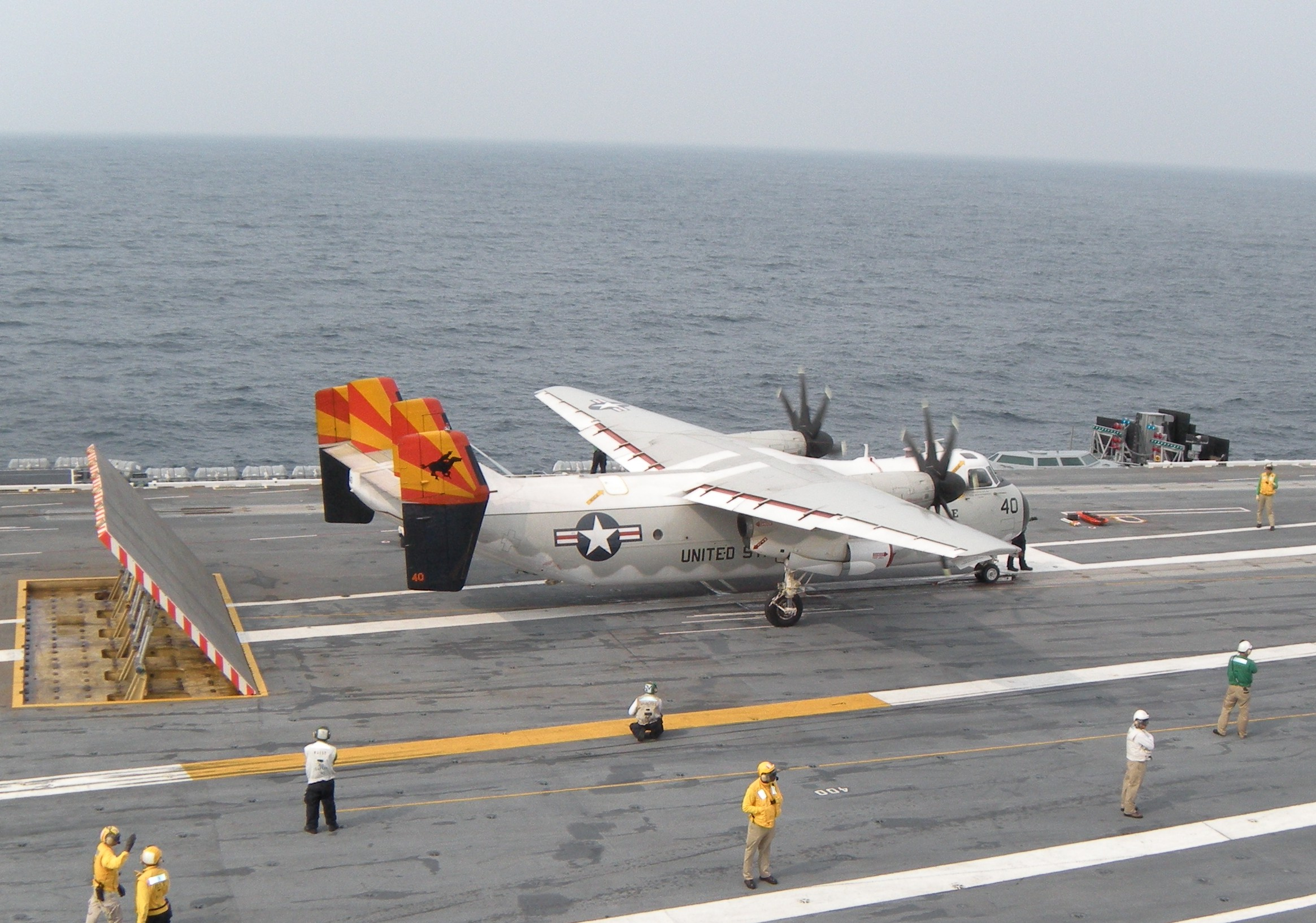
A VRC-40 C-2A(R) after SLEP on USS Carl Vinson, July 2009

In November 2008, the company also obtained a $37M contract for the maintenance, logistics, and aviation administration services over five years for the C-2A fleet assigned to VX-20 test and evaluation squadron at Patuxent River. Northrop Grumman worked on an upgraded C-2 version, and offered to modernize the fleet with components common to the E-2D Hawkeye.

== Operational history ==
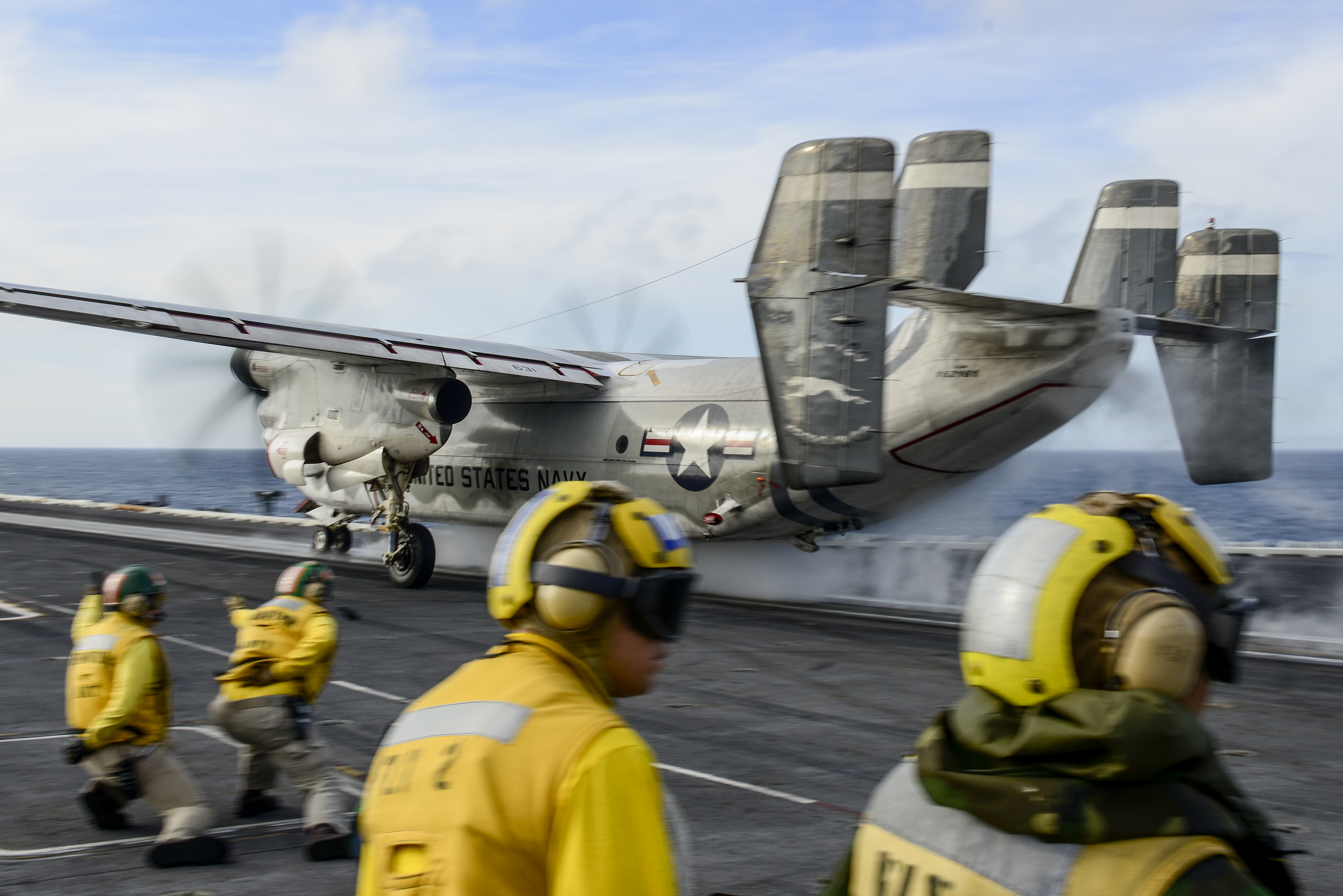
A C-2 Greyhound launches from a carrier at sea

Between November 1985 and February 1987, VR-24 (former Navy Transport Squadron) and its seven reprocured C-2As demonstrated the aircraft's exceptional operational readiness. The squadron delivered 2,000,000 pounds (910 t) of cargo, 2,000,000 pounds (910 t) of mail, and 14,000 passengers in the European and Mediterranean theaters. The C-2A(R) also served the carrier battle groups during Operations Desert Shield and Desert Storm during the Gulf War, as well as Operation Enduring Freedom during the war in Afghanistan.

On 2 June 2011, the US Navy lent two C-2A(R) Greyhounds from VRC-40 to the French Navy. The two aircraft were stationed at Toulon-Hyères Airport, Hyères, to assist in improving the flow of logistics and supplies to the French aircraft carrier Charles de Gaulle operating in the Mediterranean Sea off Libya in support of the NATO intervention in Libya. After 16 days, both aircraft returned to the U.S. via Shannon Airport, Ireland, on 18 June 2011.

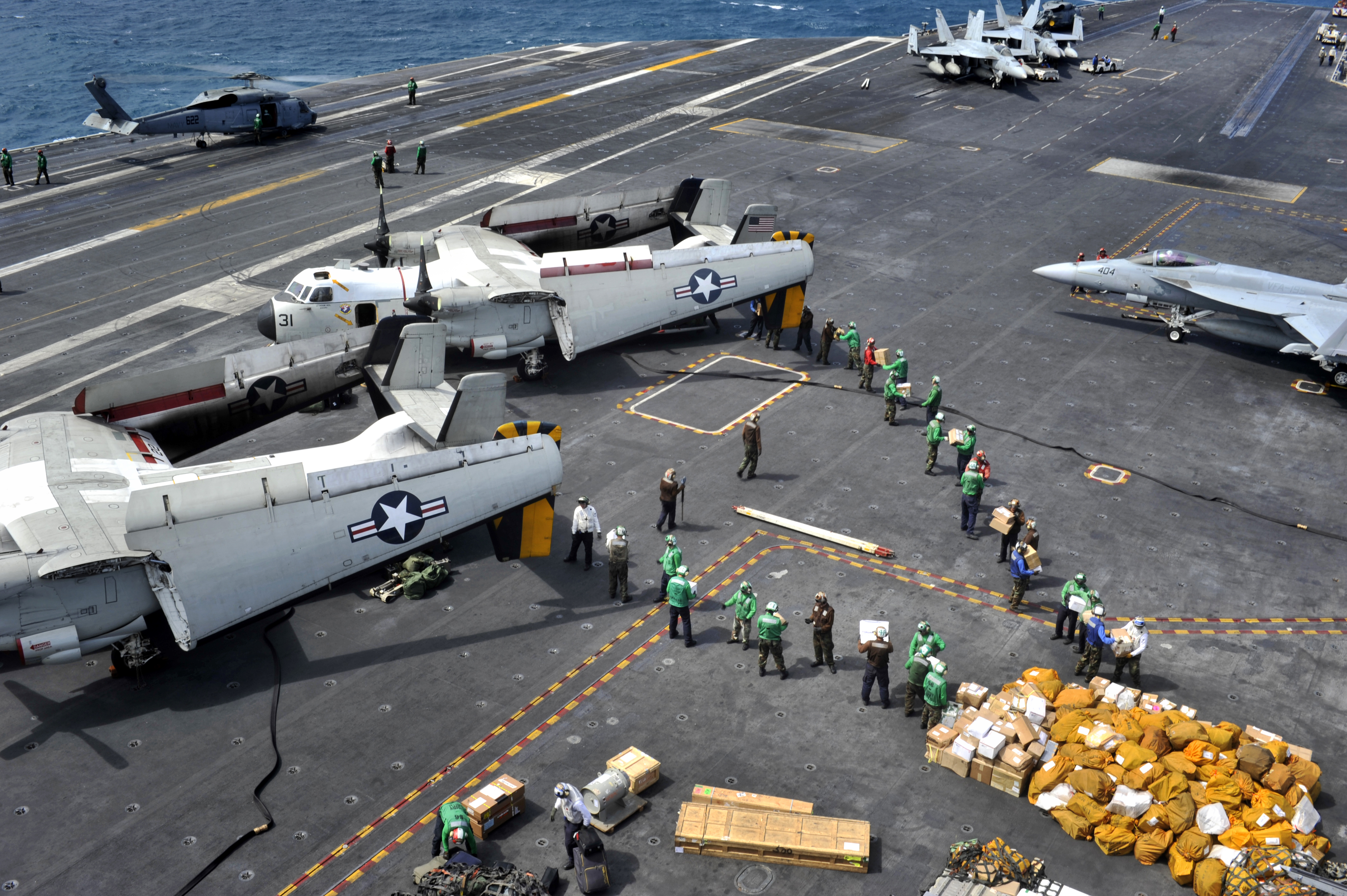
USS George Washington crew unload mail from two C-2A Greyhounds in 2011

=== Later service and replacement ===
The Common Support Aircraft was once considered as a replacement for the C-2, but failed to materialize. The U.S. Navy was exploring a replacement for the C-2 in September 2009. Three options were suggested as replacements for the aging C-2s: a new batch of updated C-2s, a transport version of the Lockheed S-3 Viking, and the tilt-rotor Bell Boeing V-22 Osprey.

The C-2 competed with the V-22 Osprey for use as the future COD aircraft. Northrop Grumman proposed modernizing the C-2 by installing the same wings, glass cockpit, and engines as the E-2D Advanced Hawkeye. Installing the Rolls-Royce T56-427A engines would cut fuel consumption by 13–15% with the same eight-bladed propeller, enabling take-offs with a 10,000-pound (4,500 kg) payload in 125 °F (52 °C) temperature and a range in excess of 1,400 nmi (1,600 mi; 2,600 km); similar performance by the C-2A requires ambient temperatures at 70 °F (21 °C), with hotter weather requiring additional fuel, therefore reducing payload. Adopting the E-2D's cockpit would deliver a 10% savings on lifetime logistical support. One of the Greyhound's most important features is its internal volume of 860 cubic feet (24 m^{3}) of cargo space. Northrop Grumman stated that their approach could cost far less than the V-22, including saving $120 million from C-2 and E-2D commonality.

In February 2015, the Navy's FY 2016 budget confirmed the V-22's selection for the COD mission, replacing the C-2A. The Navy ordered 44 Ospreys, designated CMV-22B, with deliveries that started in 2020. The C-2 was originally planned to be retired in 2027, but this was accelerated to 2024. The fleet is expected to be fully transitioned to the Osprey by 2028.

In June 2026, the C-2 made its last carrier arrested landing onboard the USS Nimitz; the aircraft belonged to Fleet Logistics Support Squadron VRC-40, the last operational C-2 squadron. On 28 July 2026, the C-2 conducted its final flight from NAS Norfolk, Virginia to NAS Pensacola, Florida. Upon arrival to the naval air station, the C-2 was officially retired from service. The specific aircraft flown, registered as Bureau Number 162159, is to be displayed at the National Naval Aviation Museum in Pensacola, Florida.

== Variants ==
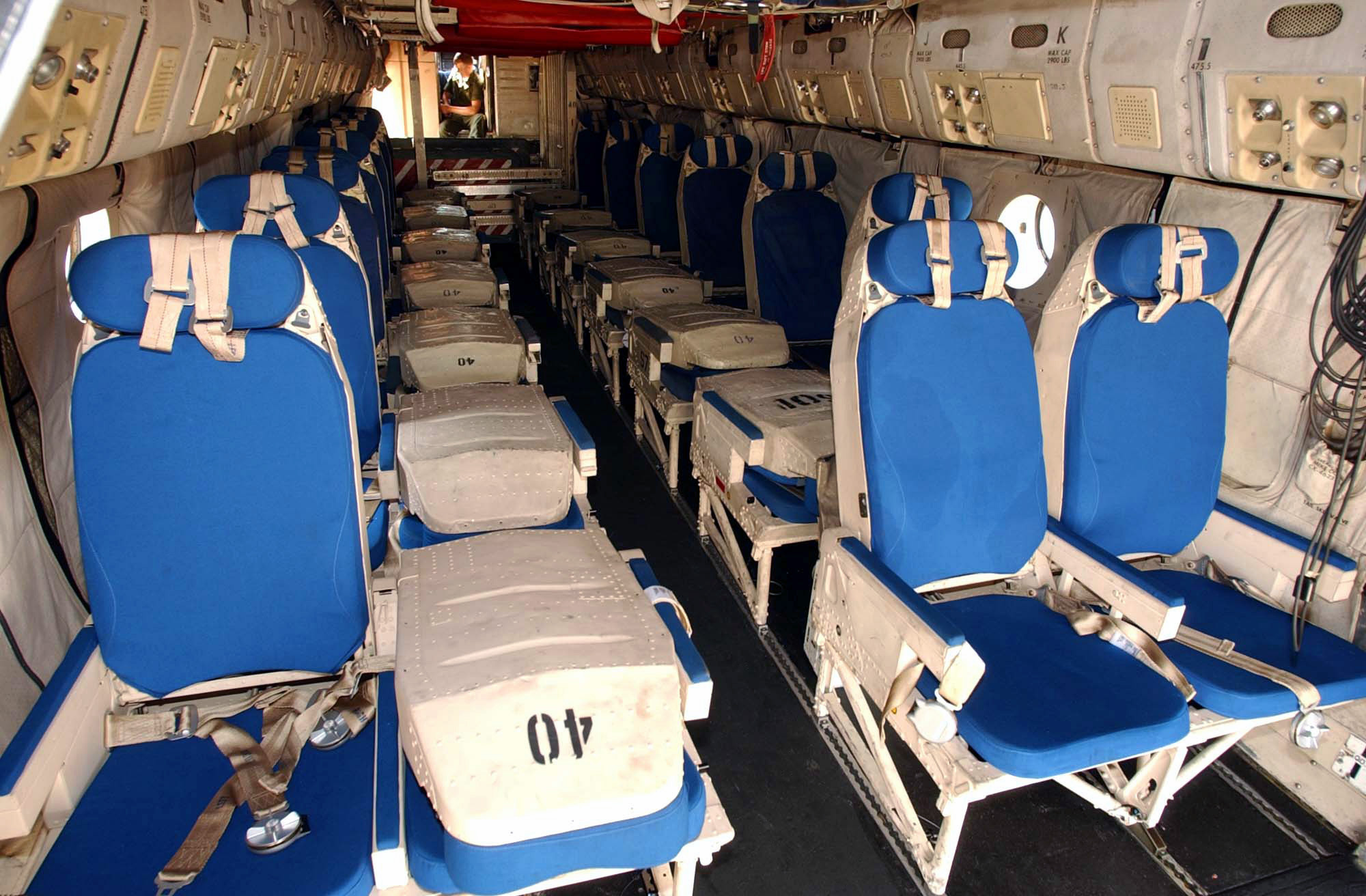
Interior view from the tail of a C-2A Greyhound assigned to Fleet Logistics Support Squadron 40 (VRC-40)

YC-2A
Prototype, two converted from E-2A Hawkeyes with redesigned fuselage
C-2A
Production variant, 17 built
C-2A(R)
"Reprocured" C-2A with improved systems based on the E-2C variant, 39 built
Greyhound 21
Turbofan powered variant used for anti-submarine warfare, electronic warfare, electronic surveillance, carrier onboard delivery and aerial refuelling. Concept only.

== Operators ==
- United States
  - United States Navy
    - VAW-110 1987 to 1994
    - VAW-120 1985 to 2023
    - VRC-30 1985 to 2023
    - VRC-40 1986 to 2026
    - VX-20 1985 to 2020
    - VRC-50 1966 to 1994
    - VR-24 1966 to 1993

== Accidents ==
- On 29 April 1965, YC-2A BuNo 148147 was on a test flight out of Naval Air Station Patuxent River when it was ditched into Long Island Sound, where the four crewmen died of exposure.
- On 2 July 1969, Lieutenant Commander Peter Monroe Kennedy was presented the Air Medal with bronze star, the first award for heroic achievement in aerial flights for a COD aircraft. While returning to Naval Air Station Cubi Point from USS Kitty Hawk operating in Southeast Asia, a failure in the engine gearbox and propeller assembly resulted in the loss of the entire port propeller assembly and substantial portions of the gearbox and nacelle. The separated propeller penetrated the fuselage, causing decompression at over 20,000 feet. Kennedy and his copilot secured the engine, descended to a lower altitude, and returned to Cubi Point.

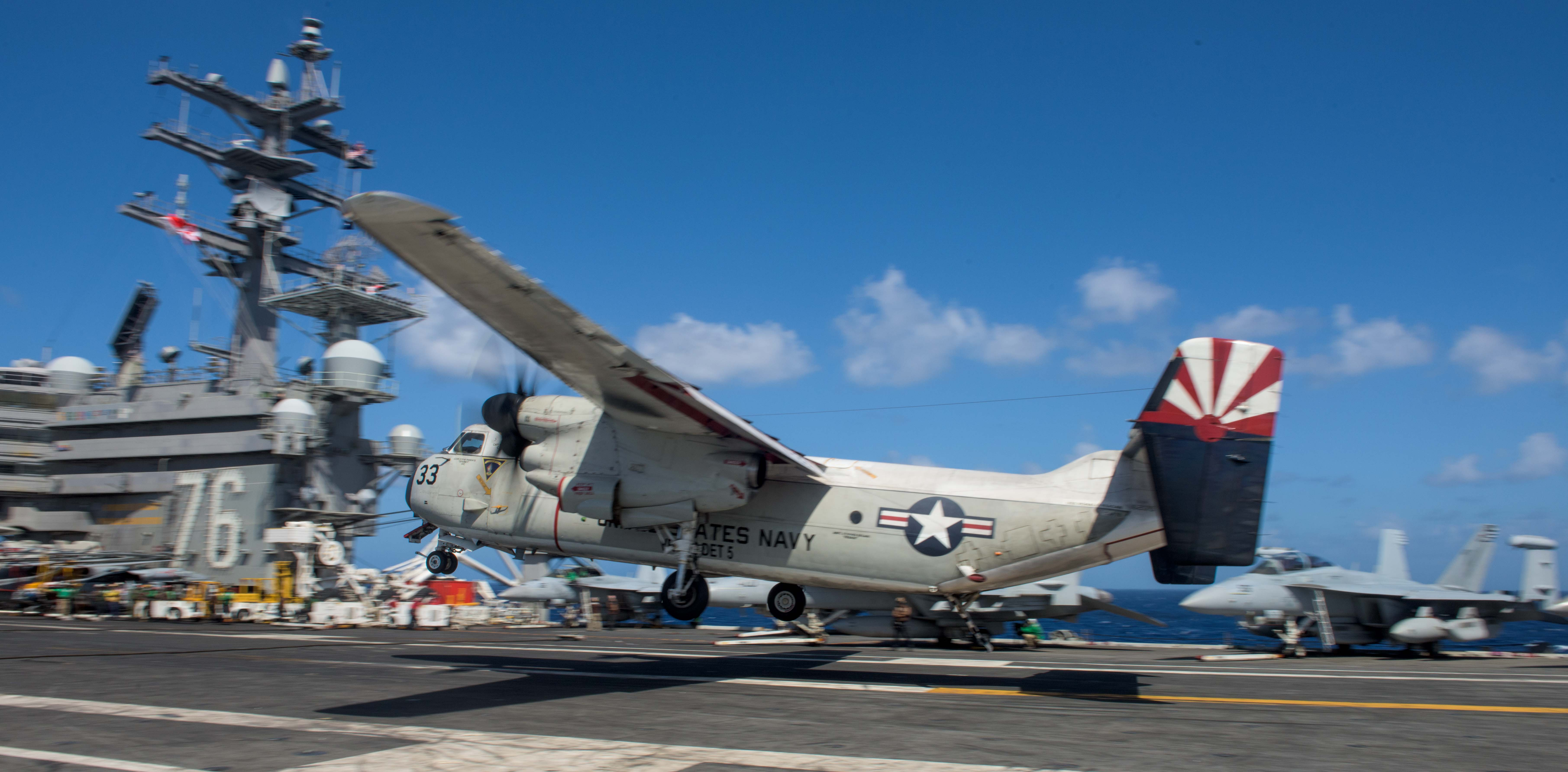
The C-2A lost on 22 November 2017, landing on the USS Ronald Reagan in July 2017

- On 2 October 1969, C-2A of VRC-50, carrying six crew members and 21 passengers, crashed in the Gulf of Tonkin en route from Cubi Point to USS Constellation. All aboard are officially listed as missing in action, as their bodies were never recovered.
- On 15 December 1970, a C-2A of VRC-50 crashed shortly after launch from USS Ranger, killing all four crew members and five passengers.
- On 23 August 1971, a C-2A of the United States Naval Test Pilot School crashed shortly after departure from Naval Air Station Patuxent River, killing all three crew members.
- On 12 December 1971, C-2A crashed en route from Cubi Point to Tan Son Nhat International Airport, killing all four crew members and six passengers.
- On 29 January 1972, C-2A crashed while attempting to land on the USS Independence in the Mediterranean Sea, killing both crewmen.
- On 16 November 1973, C-2A crashed into the sea after takeoff from Chania International Airport, killing seven of 10 persons on board.
- On 22 November 2017, C-2A of VRC-30 carrying 11 crew and passengers crashed in the waters southeast of Japan's Okinawa Island in the Philippine Sea while in flight to the aircraft carrier USS Ronald Reagan. Eight of the 11 were rescued. The aircraft was located on the ocean floor at a depth of 5,640 m (18,500 ft) during the last week of December 2017, when a salvage ship used a pinger receiver to locate the aircraft's emergency signal. The Navy salvaged the aircraft and recovered the remains of the three sailors inside, in late May 2019.

== Aircraft on display ==
US:

- C-2A BuNo 162157, formerly of VRC-40 - Valiant Air Command Warbird Museum, Titusville, Florida
- C-2A BuNo 162142, formerly of VX-20 - Patuxent River Naval Air Museum, Lexington Park, Maryland.

Brazil:

- C-2A BuNo 162174, formerly of VRC-40 - Museu Aeroespacial Paulista at Campo de Marte Airport, São Paulo

== Specifications (Reprocured C-2A) ==
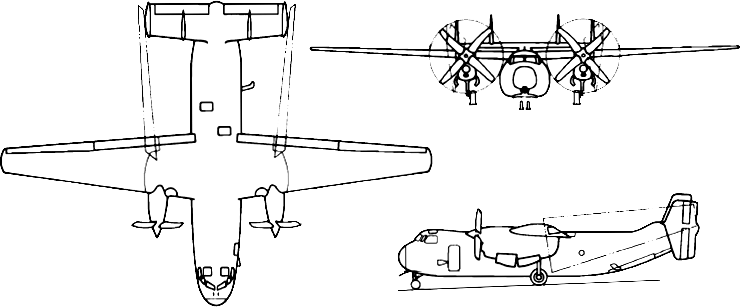
Orthographically projected diagram of the C-2A Greyhound

Data from U.S. Navy

General characteristics

- Crew: 2 flight crew and 2 loadmasters
- Capacity: 26 passengers / 12 litter patients / 10,000 lb (4,536 kg) payload
- Length: 56 ft 10 in (17.32 m)
- Wingspan: 80 ft 7 in (24.56 m)
- Height: 15 ft 10.5 in (4.839 m)
- Wing area: 700 sq ft (65 m^{2})
- Airfoil: root: NACA 63A216; tip: NACA 63A414
- Empty weight: 33,746 lb (15,307 kg)
- Gross weight: 49,394 lb (22,405 kg)
- Max takeoff weight: 60,000 lb (27,216 kg)
- Powerplant: 2 × Allison T56-A-425 turboprop engines, 4,600 shp (3,400 kW) each
- Propellers: 8-bladed UTC Aerospace Systems NP2000

Performance

- Maximum speed: 343 kn (395 mph, 635 km/h) at 12,000 ft (3,658 m)
- Cruise speed: 251 kn (289 mph, 465 km/h) at 28,700 ft (8,748 m)
- Stall speed: 82 kn (94 mph, 152 km/h)
- Range: 1,300 nmi (1,500 mi, 2,400 km) with 10,000 lb (4,500 kg) load; or 1,500 nmi (1,700 mi; 2,800 km) with light load
- Ferry range: 2,000 nmi (2,300 mi, 3,700 km) with internal fuel package
- Service ceiling: 33,500 ft (10,200 m)
- Rate of climb: 3,700 ft/min (19 m/s) at sea level
- Wing loading: 77.6 lb/sq ft (379 kg/m^{2})

== See also ==
Related development

- Northrop Grumman E-2 Hawkeye

Aircraft of comparable role, configuration, and era

- Bell Boeing CMV-22 Osprey
- Grumman C-1 Trader
- Lockheed US-3 Viking
- Xian KJ-600

Related lists

- List of military electronics of the United States
