= Grumman C-1 Trader =

United States Navy carrier on-board delivery (COD) transport aircraft

C-1 Trader TF Trader
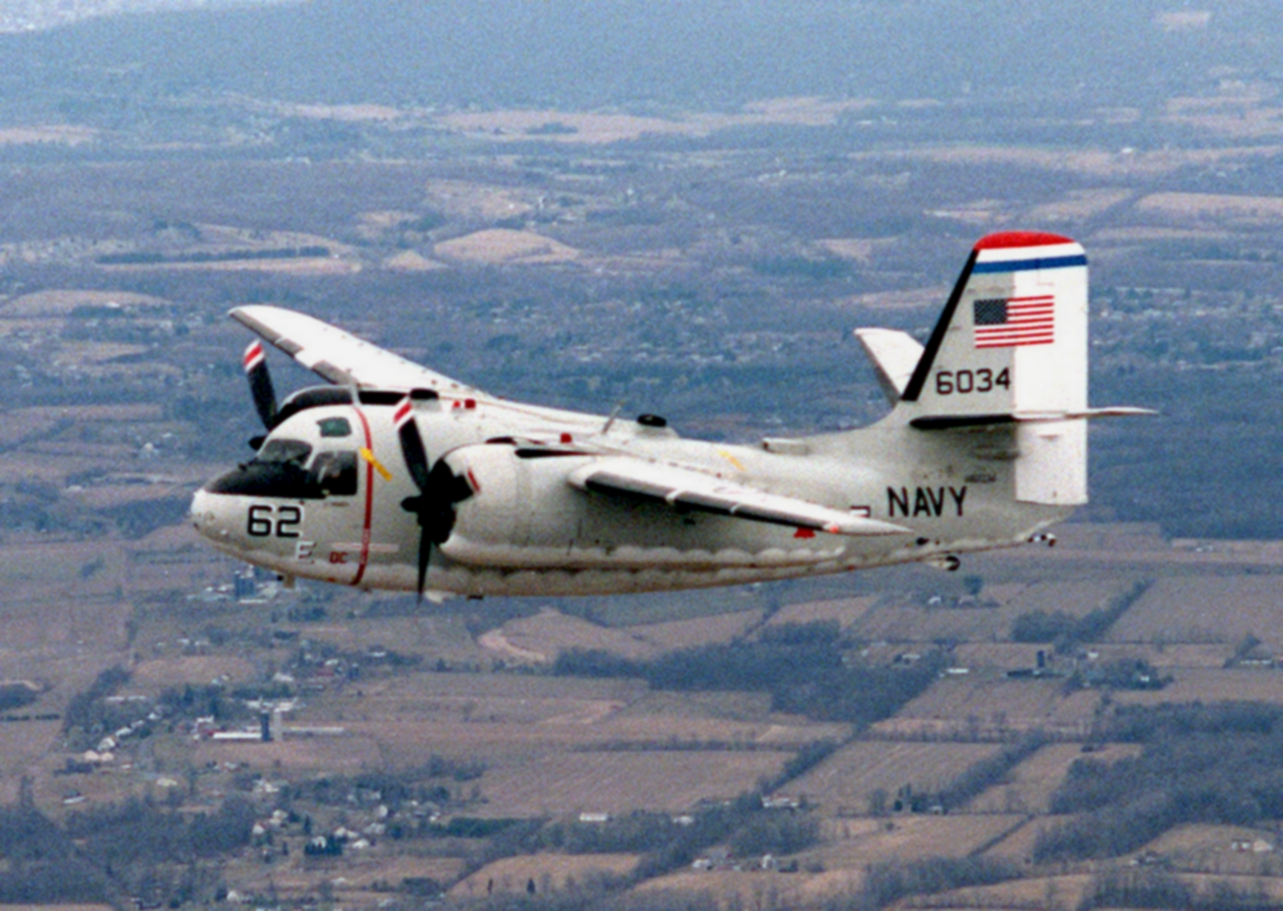
- A C-1A Trader from Naval Air Station, Willow Grove, Pennsylvania in 1987

General information
- Type: Carrier onboard delivery
- National origin: United States
- Manufacturer: Grumman
- Primary user: United States Navy
- Number built: 87

History
- Introduction date: 1956
- First flight: 19 January 1955
- Retired: 1988
- Developed from: Grumman S-2 Tracker
- Developed into: Grumman E-1 Tracer

The Grumman C-1 Trader (TF prior to 1962) is a carrier onboard delivery (COD) variant of the Grumman S-2 Tracker. It was replaced by a similar version of the Northrop Grumman E-2 Hawkeye, the Grumman C-2 Greyhound. It entered service in 1956 and was retired in 1988, with 87 aircraft produced.

== Design and development ==
The C-1 Trader grew out of a need by the United States Navy for a new anti-submarine airplane. In response to this Grumman began development on a prototype twin-engine, high-wing aircraft which it designated the G-89. In 1952 the Navy designated this aircraft the XS2F-1 and flew it for the first time on December 4 that year. During the rest of the 1950s three major variants emerged, the C-1 Trader being one of them. The C-1 (originally the TF-1, for "Trainer", a secondary role) was outfitted to carry nine passengers or 3,500 pounds (1,600 kg) of cargo and first flew in January 1955.

== Operational history ==
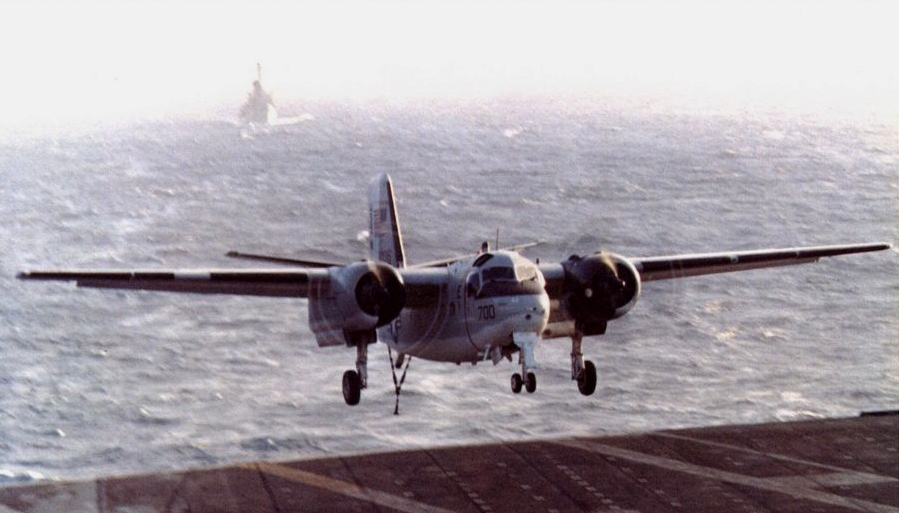
C-1 Trader lands on USS Midway (CV-41), 1982

Throughout the 1960s and 1970s the C-1 Trader carried mail and supplies to aircraft carriers on station in the Pacific Ocean during the Vietnam War and also served as a trainer for all-weather carrier operations. Over its production life 87 C-1 Traders were built, of which four were converted into EC-1A Tracer electronic countermeasures aircraft. The last C-1 was retired from USN service in 1988; it was the second-to-last radial engine aircraft in US military service, preceding the Convair C-131 which was retired in 1990. As of 2010, approximately ten were still airworthy in civil hands, operating as warbirds.

In 1956 the US Marine Corps Test Unit Number 1 (MCTU #1) tested the concept of using the TF-1 variant as a vehicle for inserting reconnaissance teams behind enemy lines. "On 9 July 1956 MCTU Recon Marines became the first to parachute from a TF-1. Less than three weeks later, four recon parachutists launched from the USS Bennington, which was 70 miles (110 km) at sea, and jumped on a desert drop zone near El Centro California, some 100 mi (160 km) inland. For the first time in Marine Corps and Naval Aviation history, the technique of introducing recon personnel off a carrier sea base to an inland objective had successfully been tested."

In August 2010, Brazilian Naval Aviation announced that it would buy and modernize eight C-1 airframes to serve in carrier onboard delivery and aerial refueling roles for use on its aircraft carrier São Paulo. In 2011 contract was signed with Marsh Aviation to convert four ex-US Navy C-1A Trader airframes into KC-2 Turbo Traders. The first KC-2 prototype flight was expected for November 2017 and the delivery of the first operational aircraft was scheduled for December 2018; in 2014 the contract was reaffirmed, but by 2023, with no aircraft having been delivered and São Paulo long since having been stricken, the contract was cancelled.

== Variants ==
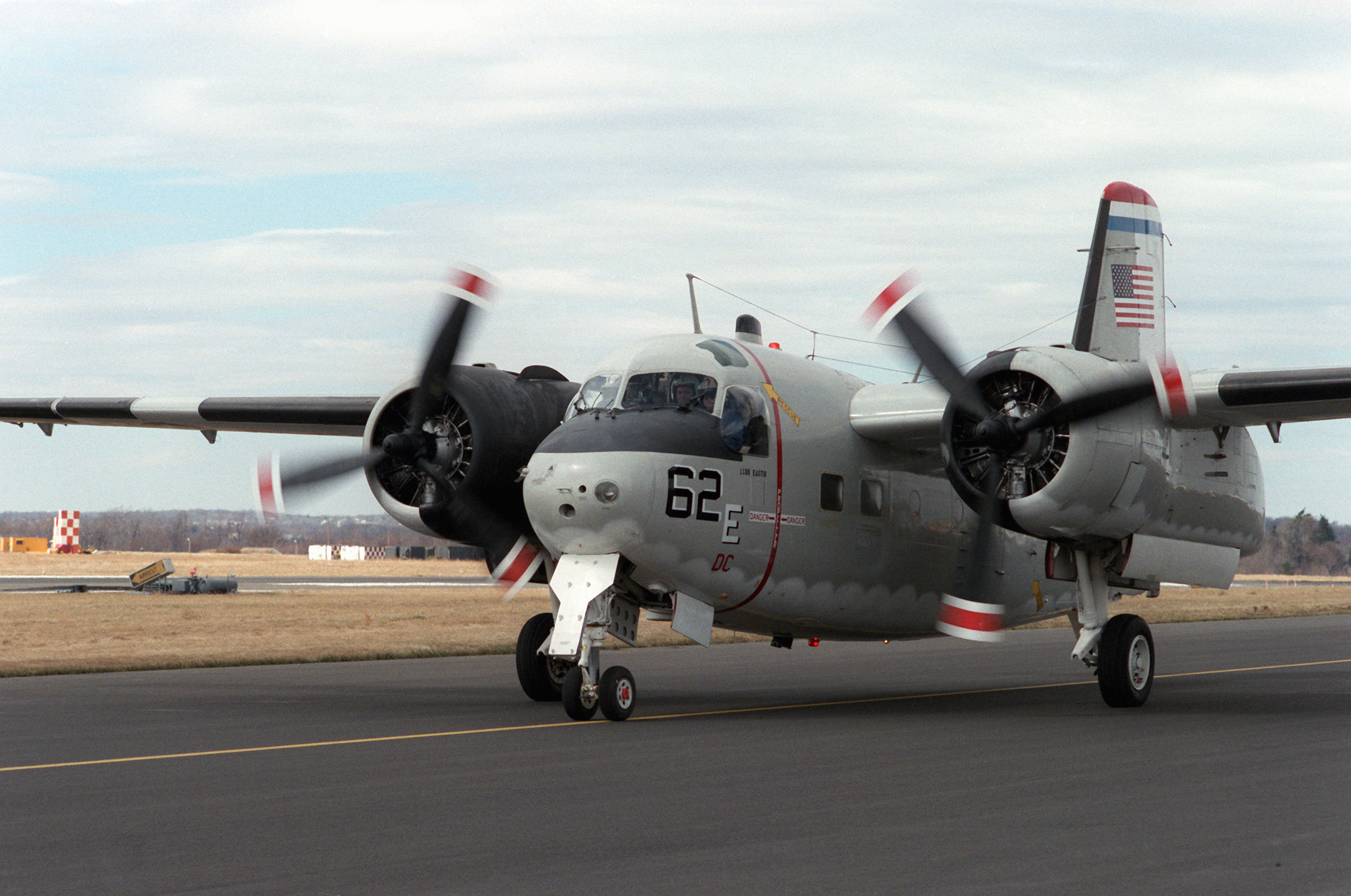
Grumman C-1 at Willow Grove Base, Pennsylvania, US. 1987

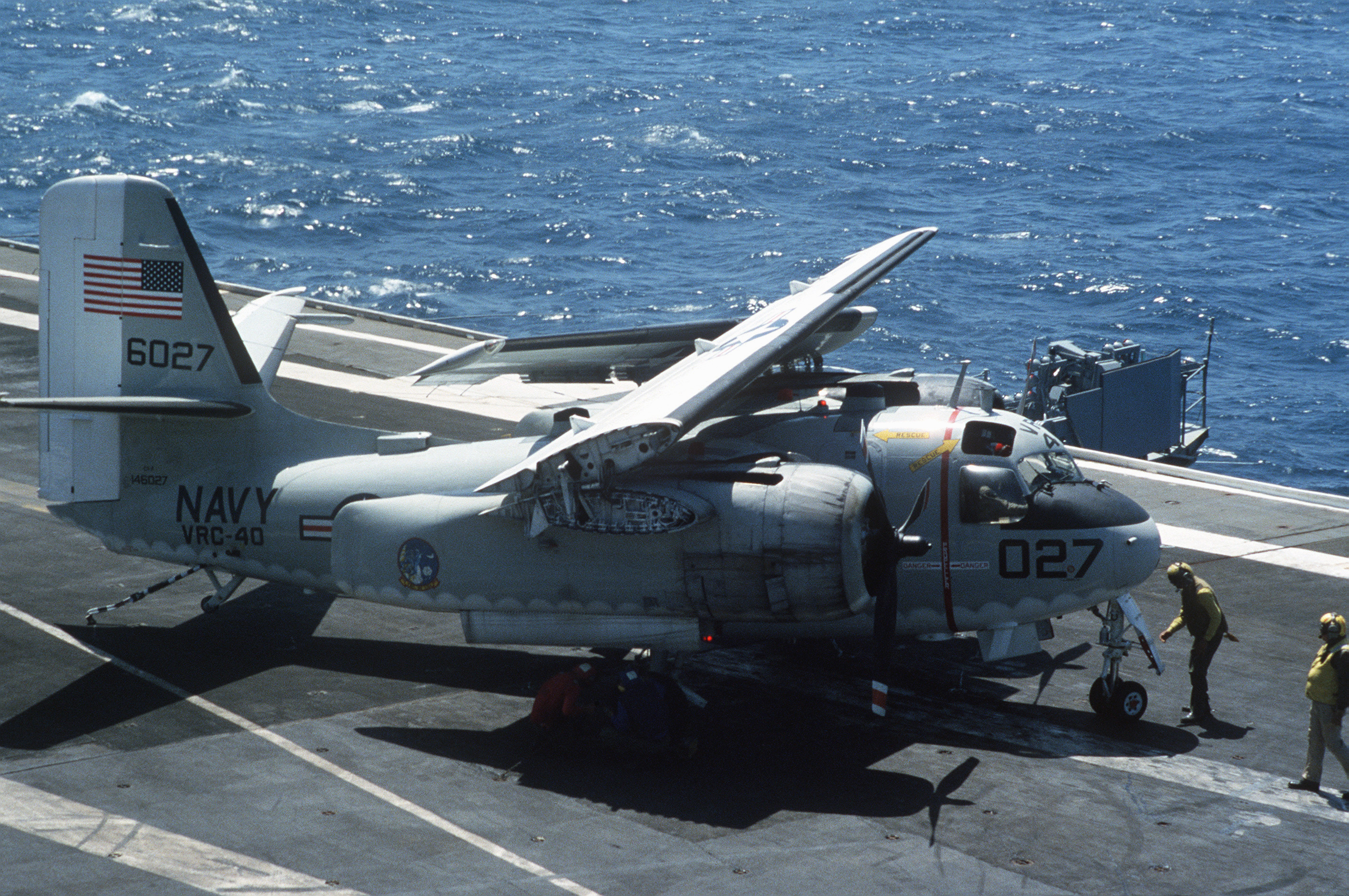
On the deck of the USS Lexington, 1985

TF-1
Carrier Onboard Delivery version of the S-2 Tracker with enlarged fuselage for nine passengers, redesignated C-1A in 1962, 87 built.
TF-1Q
Electronic Countermeasures conversion of the TF-1, redesignated EC-1A in 1962, four conversions.
TF-1W
Airborne Early Warning project that was developed in the WF-2 Tracer.
C-1A
TF-1 redesignated in 1962.
EC-1A
TF-1Q redesignated in 1962.
KC-2 Turbo Trader
Marsh Aviation modernization project for Air-to-Air Refueling, requested for the Brazilian Navy.
G-101
Proposed 10-12 seat passenger variant
G-104
Proposed tanker variant

== Operators ==
United States

- United States Navy

== Surviving aircraft ==
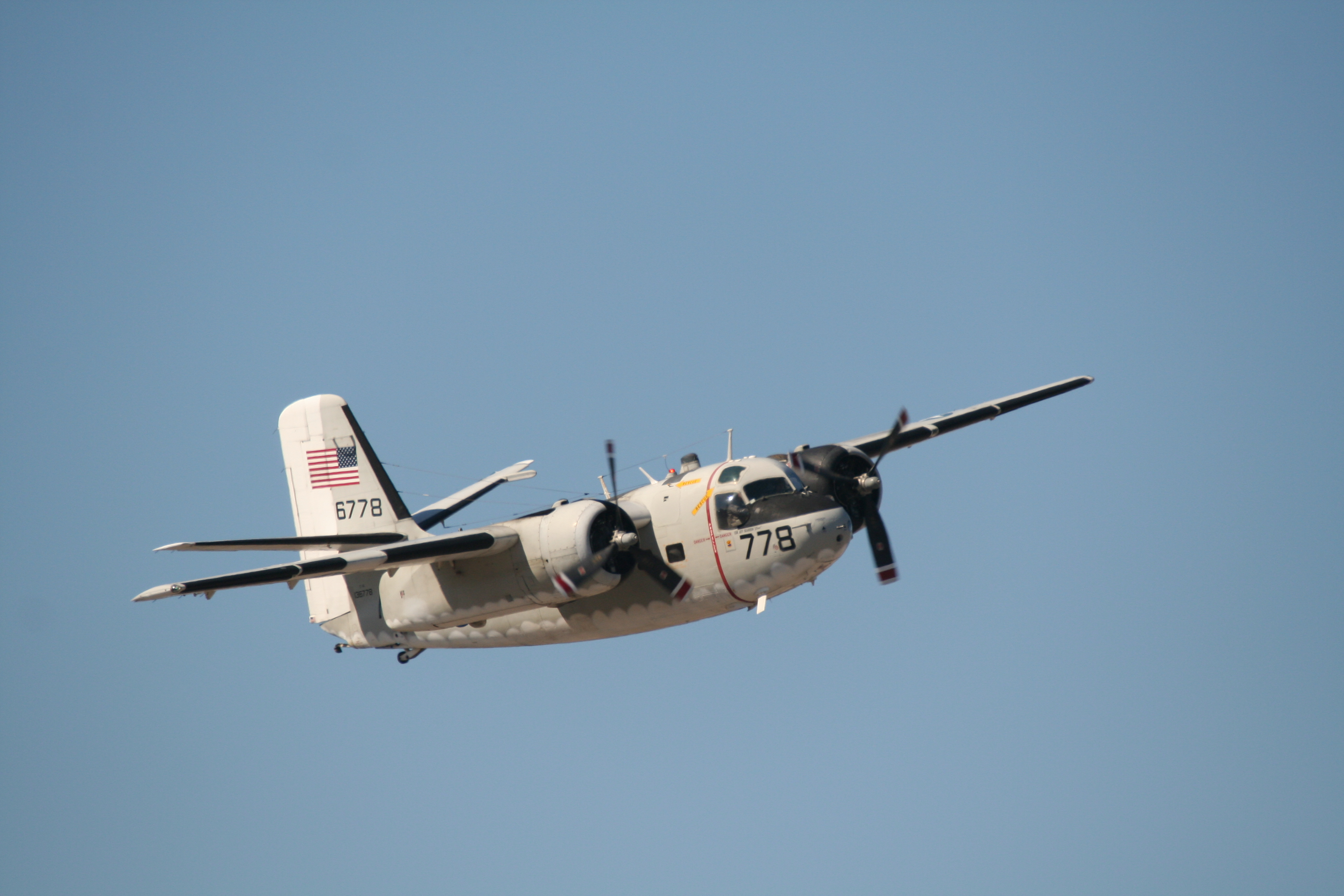
Retired C-1 on display at an air show, 2011

Airworthy

- BuNo 136752 – based at Lauridsen Aviation Museum in Buckeye, Arizona.
- BuNo 136766 – privately owned in Carson City, Nevada.
- BuNo 136773 – privately owned in Wilmington, Delaware.
- BuNo 136778 – based at Champaign Aviation Museum in Urbana, Ohio.
- BuNo 136781 – based at Pacific Coast Air Museum in Santa Rosa, California.
- BuNo 146027 – privately owned in Wilmington, Delaware.
- BuNo 146044 – privately owned in Oklahoma City, OK.
- BuNo 146048 – privately owned in Reno, Nevada.
- BuNo 146052 – based at Lone Star Flight Museum in Houston, Texas.

On display

- BuNo 136754 – National Museum of Naval Aviation, NAS Pensacola, Pensacola, Florida.
- BuNo 136790 – Grissom Air Museum, Grissom ARB (former Grissom AFB), Kokomo, Indiana.
- BuNo 136792 – NAVSUP Weapon Systems Support Philadelphia, Pennsylvania. (formerly display at the Quonset Air Museum)
- BuNo 146034 – Wings of Freedom Aviation Museum, former NAS Willow Grove, Horsham, Pennsylvania.
- BuNo 146036 – USS Midway Museum, San Diego, California.

== Specifications (C-1A) ==
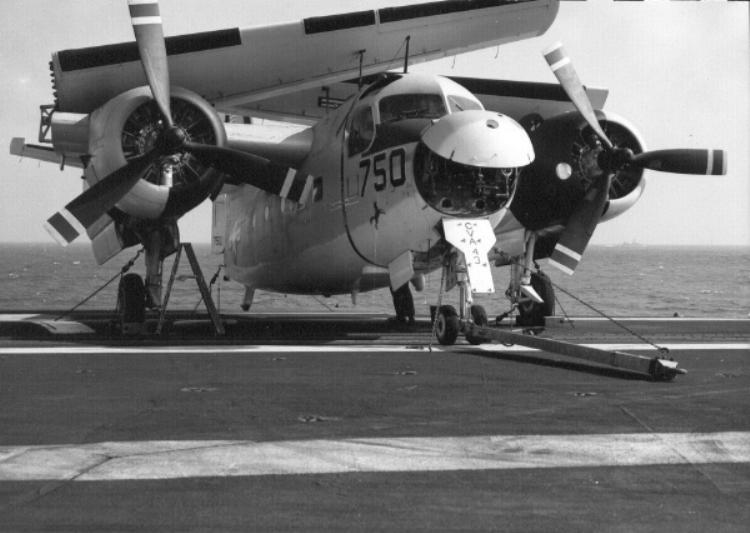
C-1A on board USS Coral Sea, with its wings folded.

Data from Grumman aircraft since 1929.

General characteristics

- Crew: 3
- Capacity: 9 pax / 8,500 lb (3,856 kg) payload
- Length: 42 ft (13 m)
- Wingspan: 69 ft 8 in (21.23 m)
- Height: 16 ft 3.5 in (4.97 m)
- Wing area: 485 sq ft (45.1 m^{2})
- Airfoil: root: NACA 63A420; tip: NACA 63A415
- Empty weight: 16,631 lb (7,544 kg)
- Gross weight: 23,031 lb (10,447 kg)
- Max takeoff weight: 24,600 lb (11,158 kg)
- Powerplant: 2 × Wright R-1820-82WA Cyclone 9-cylinder air-cooled radial piston engines, 1,525 hp (1,137 kW) each
- Propellers: 3-bladed constant-speed fully-feathering reversible-pitch propellers

Performance

- Maximum speed: 280 mph (450 km/h, 240 kn) at 4,000 ft (1,200 m)
- Cruise speed: 167 mph (269 km/h, 145 kn)
- Range: 1,110 mi (1,790 km, 960 nmi)
- Service ceiling: 24,800 ft (7,600 m)
- Rate of climb: 1,950 ft/min (10 m/s)
- Wing loading: 47.5 lb/sq ft (232 kg/m^{2})
- Power/mass: 0.13 hp/lb (0.21 kW/kg)

== See also ==
- Carrier onboard delivery

Related development

- Grumman S-2 Tracker
- Grumman E-1 Tracer

Aircraft of comparable role, configuration, and era

- Grumman C-2 Greyhound
