= Naval Air Training Command =

One-star command of the U.S. Naval Education and Training Command

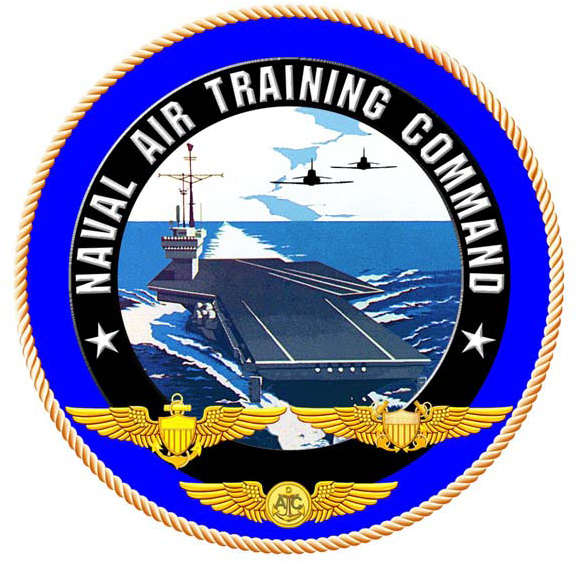
- Logo of Naval Air Training Command
- Active: July 1972 - present (as Naval Air Training Command)
- Country: United States of America
- Branch: United States Navy
- Type: Training Command
- Role: Flight training of Naval Aviators, Naval Flight Officers and unmanned aircraft pilots for the U.S. Navy, Marine Corps and Coast Guard
- Headquarters: NAS Corpus Christi; Corpus Christi, Texas, U.S.
- Nicknames: "CNATRA", "NATRACOM"
- Flying hours: 301,532 (2016)
- Website: www.cnatra.navy.mil

Commanders
- Commander: RADM Max G. McCoy Jr.
- Chief of Staff: CAPT Paul N. Flores

Aircraft flown
- Fighter: F/A-18E,F Super Hornet (Blue Angels)
- Trainer helicopter: TH-73A Thrasher
- Trainer: T-6A,B Texan; T-44C Pegasus; T-45C Goshawk; T-54A Marlin II
- Transport: C-130J Hercules (Blue Angels)

The Naval Air Training Command (NATRACOM) is a one-star Echelon III command that conducts flight training of U.S. Navy, U.S. Marine Corps and U.S. Coast Guard student Naval Aviators, U.S. Navy student Naval Flight Officers, (Note: The USCG has no aircraft which are crewed by NFOs and the USMC is in the final stages of retiring its last NFO crewed aircraft (the F/A-18D)) and U.S. Navy, U.S. Marine Corps and U.S. Coast Guard student unmanned aircraft pilots. (Note: U.S. Navy Air Vehicle Pilots (AVP) are warrant officers who operate the MQ-25 Stingray aircraft carrier based air vehicle, U.S. Coast Guard Aerial Vehicle Pilots (AVP) are commissioned officers who operate the MQ-9 Reaper unmanned aircraft system, and U.S. Marine Corps Unmanned Aircraft Systems Officers (UASO) are commissioned officers who operate the MQ-9 Reaper unmanned aircraft system) Though it does not conduct Naval Aircrew training which is conducted by Naval Education and Training Command's Naval Aviation Schools Command (NASC), it is responsible for monitoring the production of Aircrewmen through the Naval Aviator Production Process (NAPP). Through the NAPP, NATRACOM is also responsible for programming and monitoring the production of all (currently 19) Navy and Marine Corps Fleet Replacement Squadrons.

It conducts operations aboard five Naval Air Stations in three states. The Mission of Naval Air Training Command is to train the world’s finest combat quality aviation professionals, delivering them at the right time, in the right numbers, and at the right cost.

== Chief of Naval Air Training ==
The Chief of Naval Air Training (CNATRA), currently RADM Max G. McCoy Jr., leads the Naval Air Training Command (NATRACOM) and is headquartered on board Naval Air Station Corpus Christi, Texas. As recently as 2009, NATRACOM's 739 aircraft logged 358,449 flight hours, nearly a third of the Department of the Navy total for that fiscal year. To put those numbers in perspective, CNATRA flew 28% of the combined Navy and Marine Corps flight hours with 19% of the aircraft. In that same time more than 2,400 Naval Aviators, Naval Flight Officers (NFO) and Naval Aircrewmen earned their "Wings of Gold".

== Subordinate commands ==
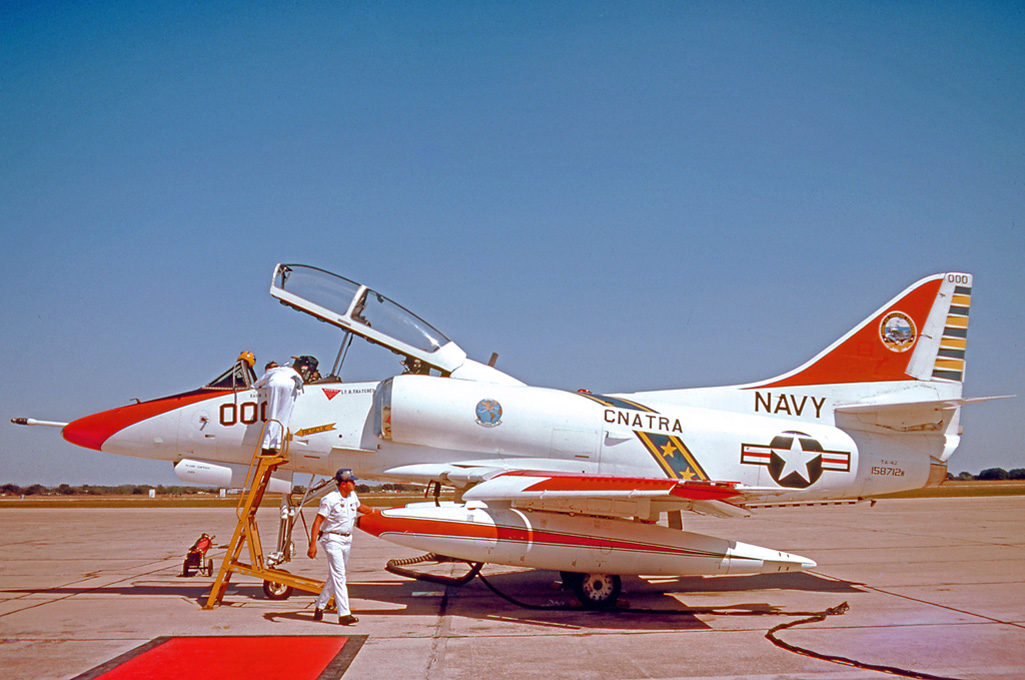
TA-4J Skyhawk flown by the Commander Naval Air Training Command CNATRA. The red carpet has been rolled out for him at Randolph AFB, Texas, in 1975

CNATRA leads the Naval Air Training Command (NATRACOM) composed of five Training Air Wings. The five active wings are home to seventeen Training Squadrons, designated VT and HT squadrons.

- Training Air Wing One Tail Code "A" at NAS Meridian, Mississippi
  - VT-7 Eagles, Advanced training in the T-45C Goshawk
  - VT-9(2nd) Tigers, Advanced training in the T-45C Goshawk
- Training Air Wing Two Tail Code "B" at NAS Kingsville, Texas
  - VT-21 Redhawks, Advanced training in the T-45C Goshawk
  - VT-22 Golden Eagles, Advanced training in the T-45C Goshawk
- Training Air Wing Four Tail Code "G" at NAS Corpus Christi, Texas
  - VT-27 Boomers, Primary training in the T-6B Texan II
  - VT-28 Rangers, Primary training in the T-6B Texan II
  - VT-31 Wise Owls, Advanced training in the T-44C Pegasus (Note: being replaced by the T-54A Marlin II by 2027)
  - VT-35 Stingrays, Advanced training in the T-54A Marlin II
- Training Air Wing Five Tail Code "E" at NAS Whiting Field, Florida
  - VT-2 Doerbirds, Primary training in the T-6B Texan II
  - VT-3 Red Knights, Primary training in the T-6B Texan II
  - VT-6 Shooters, Primary training in the T-6B Texan II
  - HT-8 Eightballers, Advanced training in the TH-73A Thrasher
  - HT-18 Vigilant Eagles, Advanced training in the TH-73A Thrasher
  - HT-28 Hellions, Advanced training in the TH-73A Thrasher
- Training Air Wing Six Tail Code "F" at NAS Pensacola, Florida
  - VT-4 Warbucks, Advanced NFO training in the Multi-Crew Simulator
  - VT-10 Wildcats, Primary NFO training in the T-6A Texan II and primary AVP/UASO training in the T-6A simulator
  - VT-86 Sabrehawks, Advanced NFO training in the T-45C Goshawk and advanced AVP/UASO training utilizing purpose built simulators

There were three Training Air Wings which have been disestablished (with assigned squadrons)

- Training Air Wing Three Tail Code "C" at the former NAS Chase Field, Texas: Disestablished 31 Aug 1992
  - VT-24 Bobcats: Disestablished
  - VT-25 Cougars: Disestablished
  - VT-26 Tigers: Disestablished
- Training Air Wing Seven Tail Code 2S until 1974, Tail Code F through 1976 disestablishment at the former NAS Saufely Field, Florida: Disestablished 1 Dec 1976
  - VT-1 Eaglets: Disestablished
  - VT-5 Tigers: Disestablished
- Training Air Wing Eight at the former NAS Glynco, Georgia: Disestablished Aug 1974
  - VT-86 Sabrehawks: Transferred to Training Air Wing Six
- Disestablished or Deactivated other Training Squadrons
  - VT-9(1st) Tigers: Established at Training Air Wing ONE, disestablished July 1987
  - VT-23 Professionals: Established at Training Air Wing TWO, transferred to Training Air Wing ONE in 1994, deactivated 30 Sep 1999
  - VT-29: Established at Training Air Wing FOUR, disestablished 31 Dec 1976 (was a land based multi-engine aircraft navigator training squadron)

CNATRA also oversees the Naval Flight Demonstration Squadron (NFDS) Blue Angels.

== Naval Air Stations ==
NATRACOM conducts flight operations at the following Naval Air Stations:

- NAS Corpus Christi, Corpus Christi, Texas
- NAS Kingsville, Kingsville, Texas
- NAS Meridian, Meridian, Mississippi
- NAS Pensacola, Pensacola, Florida
- NAS Whiting Field, Milton, Florida

== Naval Aviation Enterprise (NAE) ==
The NATRACOM is part of the Naval Aviation Enterprise (NAE), reporting to Commander, Naval Air Forces.

== See also ==
- List of United States Navy aircraft designations (pre-1962) / List of United States naval aircraft
- Military aviation
- Modern United States Navy carrier air operations
- Naval aviation
- Naval flight officer
- United States Naval Aviator
- List of United States Navy aircraft wings
