= Advanced Helicopter Training =

Helicopter pilot training and education course

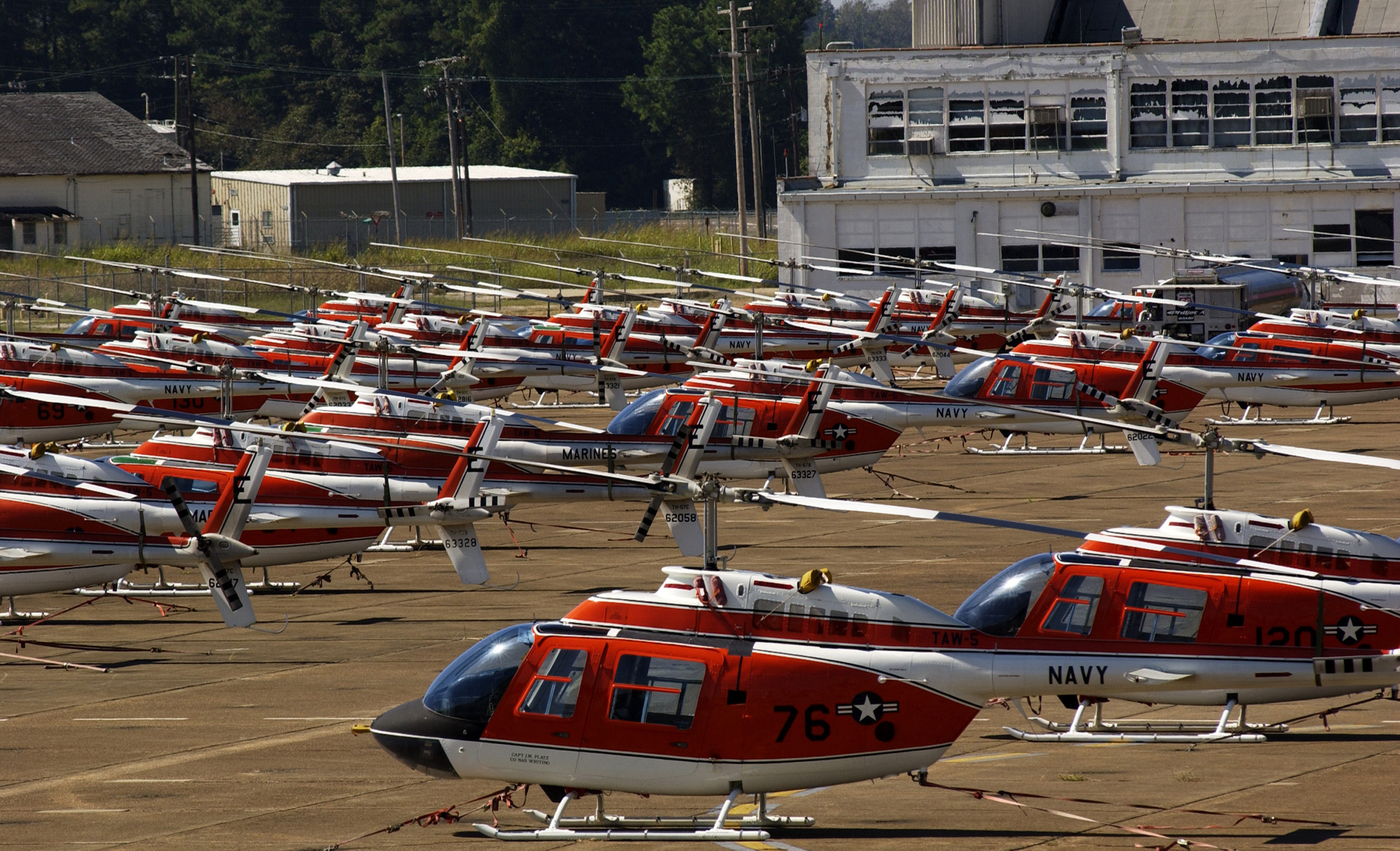
The flight line of Millington Regional Airport in 2004, the parked TH-57 Sea Rangers were evacuated from NAS Whiting Field to avoid Hurricane Ivan.

Advanced Helicopter Training is a type of training and education course undertaken by qualified helicopter pilots to further enhance their knowledge and safety skills. Advanced helicopter training is offered by a number of commercial providers but also is an integral part of military training, including the US Armed Forces.

== United States ==
The last phase of flight school for United States Navy and Marine Corps helicopter pilots is entitled Advanced Helicopter Training. Training is accomplished at NAS Whiting Field in Milton, Florida. All training was historically done with Bell TH-57 Sea Rangers helicopters, however these have been gradually replaced by the TH-73 Thrasher, a military variant of the AgustaWestland AW119 Koala.

Advanced training is approximately six months long, and is divided into ten phases:

- Ground school: aircraft systems, local course rules, emergency procedures
- Familiarization: hovering, basic helicopter maneuvers
- Tactics: confined-area landings, external load operations, high-speed landings
- Trans-fams: familiarization in the instrument capable - TH-57C model
- Basic instruments (BIs): common instrument scans
- Radio instruments (RIs): instrument approaches, basic instrument navigation
- Visual/instrument navigation: cross-country navigation
- Low-level navigation: visual navigation below 500 feet AGL
- Formation: section formation maneuvers
- Night familiarization/Night vision goggles (NVGs)

Three squadrons perform advanced helicopter training: HT-8 Eightballers, HT-18 Vigilant Eagles and HT-28 Hellions. Training is also done for the United States Coast Guard and for the navies and marines of several allied countries, including Italy, Spain, and Germany.

The US Army also undertakes advanced helicopter training.
