= HT-28 =

Helicopter Training Squadron 28
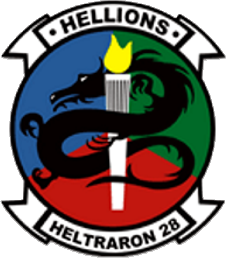
- HT-28 Hellions
- Active: 25 May 2007 - present
- Country: United States of America
- Branch: United States Navy
- Type: Rotary Training
- Size: 290+/-
- Part of: Training Air Wing Five
- Garrison/HQ: NAS Whiting Field
- Nickname(s): Lucky
- Motto(s): Professionalism, Integrity, Judgment
- Colors: Red, blue and green

Commanders
- Predecessor: LtCol A. Kellner, USMC
- Commanding: CDR M. Felber, USN
- Successor: LtCol J. Glines, USMC

Aircraft flown
- Trainer helicopter: TH-73 Thrasher

Helicopter Training Squadron 28 (HT-28) is a United States Navy helicopter training squadron based at Naval Air Station Whiting Field in Milton, Florida. The squadron, known as the Hellions, is one of three Advanced Helicopter Training squadrons that produces aviators for the Navy, Marine Corps and Coast Guard. They fall under the command of Training Air Wing Five and fly the TH-73A Thrasher helicopter trainer. The squadron's tactical call sign is "Lucky."

== Mission ==
HT-28's primary mission is to transition student aviators through basic and advanced rotary wing pilot training. Along with its sister squadrons, HT-8 and HT-18, HT-28 provides advanced helicopter flight instruction to all Navy, US Marine Corps, and US Coast Guard helicopter flight students as well as international students from several allied nations. Additionally, HT-28 conducts a shortened helicopter syllabus for prospective MV-22 Osprey pilots.

Basic training introduces and develops student skills in helicopter flight maneuvers as well as training in visual navigation and tactics. Advanced training completes an intensive curriculum of basic and radio instruments, advanced tactics, and shipboard landings. The completion of this exacting training syllabus culminates in a highly trained and proficient all-weather aviator. Students who successfully complete the program earn the right to wear the coveted Wings of Gold.

== Insignia ==
The squadron insignia for HT-28 is a tri-colored circular field featuring a dragon and torch. The tri-color field is a reference to HT-8 and HT-18 patches; an acknowledgment that HT-28 was initially established by officers from those squadrons. The deep blue section represents the US Navy and its operations over the world’s oceans. The olive green section represents the US Marine Corps and its projection of power ashore. The red section symbolizes these services’ heritage of valor and sacrifice in peace and war. The black Chinese Loong dragon symbolizes both wisdom and ferocity in battle. It is coiled around a lighted torch, which signifies knowledge passed from one generation of aviators to the next. The dragon’s helical coils, which echo da Vinci’s famous design, are another nod to the legacy of rotary wing flight. The name "Hellions" is an allusion to the word "helicopter." Its connotation (an unruly child) is meant as an amusing reference to the pilots-in-training as they are refined into military aviators. Historically, only one other squadron has held the name "Hellions": VMF-218, a long-disestablished Marine Fighter squadron. The Chinese dragon motif from VMF-218’s original squadron patch is carried over in the HT-28 patch partly as a nod to the legacy of the name.

== History ==
HT-28 was established by the Chief of Naval Operations with an OPNAV Note 5450 dated 1 November 2006. The order reads, in part:

"Currently there are two advanced helicopter training squadrons located at Naval Air Station, Whiting Field, Milton, Florida. In order to meet projected increase in the advanced rotary Integrated Production Plan, expand oversight and ensure quality of training and safety of flight are not compromised, a third advanced rotary squadron is required."

The Establishment Ceremony was held aboard NAS Whiting Field on 25 May 2007. The squadron was initially staffed by transferring one third of the instructors from HT-8 and one third of the instructors from HT-18 to the newly established HT-28 creating three equally sized squadrons.

== Squadron command ==
HT-28 squadron commanding officers alternate between Navy Commanders and Marine Lieutenant Colonels. When a Navy Commander is in command, a Marine Lieutenant Colonel is the squadron's Executive Officer, and vice versa. When the squadron changes command, the executive officers assume command from his predecessor.

== See also ==
- History of the United States Navy
- List of United States Navy aircraft squadrons
