= Lieutenant (junior grade) =

Junior commissioned officer naval rank

Lieutenant junior grade is a junior commissioned officer rank used in a number of navies.

== United States ==
Lieutenant (junior grade)
- Insignia of the rank of lieutenant (junior grade) USN, USCG, USPHS, NOAA Corps
- Country: United States
- Service branch: United States Navy; United States Coast Guard; United States Public Health Service Commissioned Corps; NOAA Commissioned Officer Corps; US Maritime Service
- Abbreviation: LTJG
- Rank group: Junior officer
- NATO rank code: OF-1
- Pay grade: O-2
- Formation: March 3, 1883
- Next higher rank: Lieutenant
- Next lower rank: Ensign
- Equivalent ranks: First lieutenant

Related articles
- History: Master

Lieutenant (junior grade), commonly abbreviated as LTJG or, historically, Lt. (j.g.) (as well as variants of both abbreviations), is a junior commissioned officer rank of the United States Navy, the United States Coast Guard, the United States Public Health Service Commissioned Corps, and the National Oceanic and Atmospheric Administration Commissioned Officer Corps (NOAA Corps). LTJG has a US military pay grade of O-2, and a NATO rank code of OF-1. The rank is also used in the United States Maritime Service. The NOAA Corps's predecessors, the United States Coast and Geodetic Survey Corps (1917–1965) and the Environmental Science Services Administration Corps or ESSA Corps (1965–1970), also used the rank.

Lieutenant (junior grade) ranks above ensign and below lieutenant and is equivalent to a first lieutenant in the other uniformed services (the Army, Marine Corps, Air Force, and Space Force) and sub-lieutenant in the Royal Navy and the navies of many Commonwealth countries.

Promotion to LTJG is governed by Department of Defense policies derived from the Defense Officer Personnel Management Act (DOPMA) of 1980. DOPMA guidelines suggest all "fully qualified" ensigns should be promoted to LTJG. The time for promotion to LTJG is a minimum of two years after commissioning in the Navy or 18 months in the Coast Guard. Lieutenants, junior grade typically lead petty officers and non-rated personnel, unless assigned to small aircraft or on staff duty. A LTJG's usual shipboard billet is as a division officer.

Lieutenant, junior grade is often referred to colloquially as JG. Prior to March 3, 1883, this rank was known in the U.S. Navy as master.

=== US Maritime Services ===
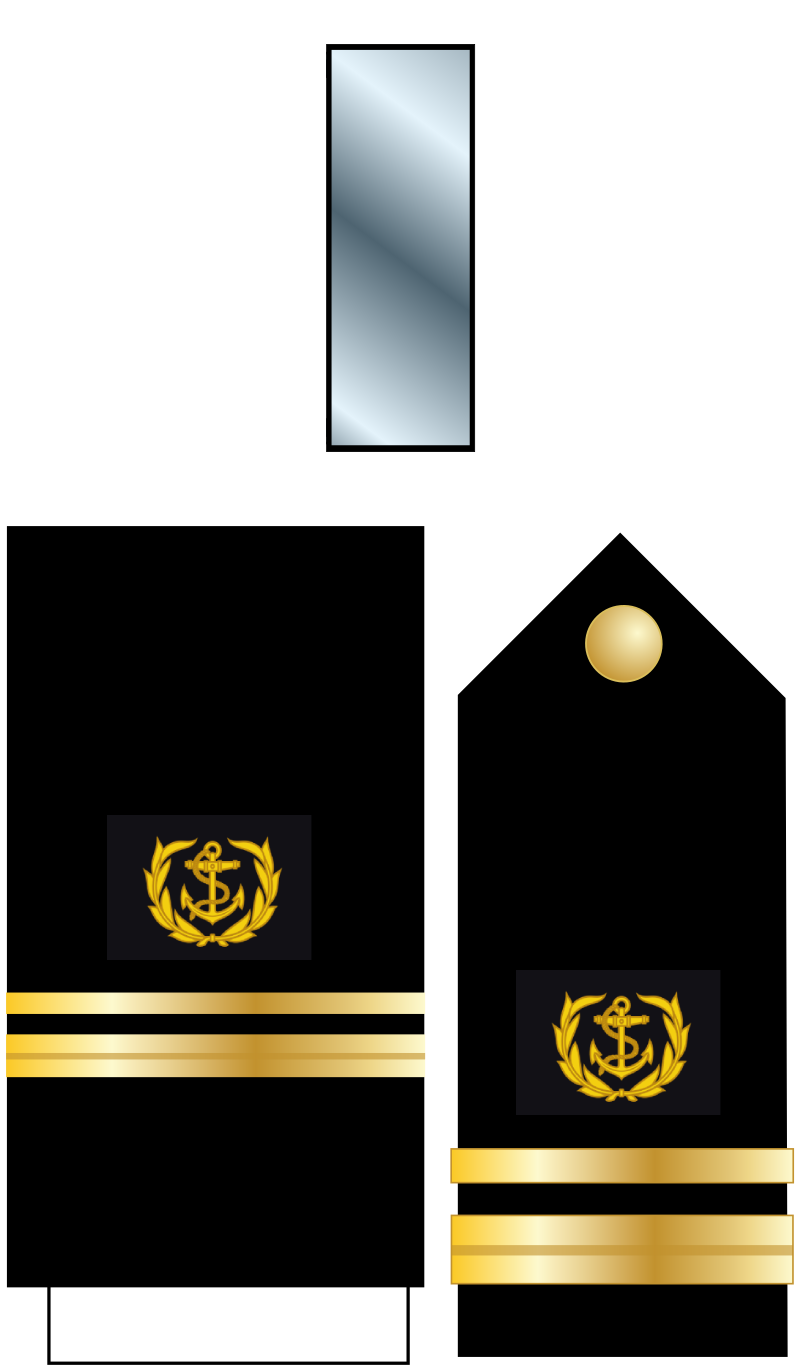
USMS Lieutenant Junior Grade

In the United States Maritime Services (USMS)—a voluntary training organization of the U.S. Department of Transportation—lieutenant (junior grade) is the second most junior rank. USMS officers are commissioned into the Naval Reserve after attending the U.S. Merchant Marine Academy or one of the other six maritime academies into the ranks of the U.S. Navy Strategic Sealift Officer Corps. Many US Maritime Services officers serve at the academy or the other six schools as faculty.

=== Notable LTJGs ===
- Neil Armstrong, Korean War naval aviator and astronaut, Commander of Apollo 11
- Francis Bellotti, former Massachusetts Attorney General, served in World War II
- Paul Brown, football coach and executive, spent WW2 as coach of Great Lakes Navy Bluejackets
- George H. W. Bush, WW2 naval aviator and 41st president of the United States
- Johnny Carson, host of The Tonight Show for 30 years, served in WW2
- Albert David, only Atlantic Fleet sailor awarded the Medal of Honor in World War II
- Kirk Douglas, American actor, served in WW2
- Henry Fonda, American film and stage actor, served in WW2
- L. Ron Hubbard, science fiction writer and founder of Scientology, served in WW2
- John F. Kennedy, WW2 PT boat CO and 35th president of the United States
- Bob Kerrey, Navy SEAL Medal of Honor recipient and U.S. senator
- Brian Lamb, founder of C-SPAN, PAO during the Vietnam era.
- Harvey Milk, gay rights activist and San Francisco Board Supervisor, served in Korea
- Thomas R. Norris, Navy SEAL and Medal of Honor recipient
- David Robinson, Naval Academy graduate, NBA Hall of Fame player
- Potter Stewart, associate justice of the U.S. Supreme Court, served in WW2
- Madeline Swegle, First Black female tactical air pilot in the United States Navy
- Jeffrey Trail, Naval Academy graduate, served in the Gulf War and was the subject (on anonymity) of a 48 Hours special about gays in the military. Trail became known in 1997 when he was the first victim of spree killer Andrew Cunanan
- Malcolm Wilson, New York politician, served in WW2
- William Sylvester White, Illinois Appellate Court justice, member of the Golden Thirteen

== Gallery ==
Lieutenant (junior grade)
(Antigua and Barbuda Coast Guard)

Lieutenant (junior grade)
(Belize Coast Guard)

ሌፍተናንት ጁኒየር ግሬድ
Lēfitenaniti junīyeri girēdi
(Ethiopian Navy)

Lieutenant (junior grade)
(Gambian Navy)

Lieutenant (junior grade)
(Guyana Coast Guard)

Lieutenant (junior grade)
(Liberian National Coast Guard)

Lieutenant (junior grade)
(Jamaican Coast Guard)

Lieutenant junior grade
(Namibian Navy)

Lieutenant junior grade
(Philippine Navy)

Lieutenant (junior grade)
(Sierra Leone Navy)

Lieutenant (junior grade)
(United States Navy)

Lieutenant (junior grade)
(United States Coast Guard)

== See also ==
- Comparative military ranks
- U.S. Navy officer rank insignia
