= Training Air Wing Two =

Training Air Wing TWO
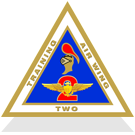
- TW-2 Insignia
- Active: January 1972 - Present
- Country: United States of America
- Branch: United States Navy
- Part of: Naval Air Training Command
- Garrison/HQ: Naval Air Station Kingsville
- Tail Code: B

Commanders
- Commodore: CAPT Raymond F. Barnes, Jr, USN

Training Air Wing TWO (TW-2 or TRAWING 2) is a United States Navy aircraft training air wing based aboard Naval Air Station Kingsville, in Kingsville, Texas. TW-2 is one of five training air wings in the Naval Air Training Command, and consists of two jet training squadrons. The wing trains Student Naval Aviators from the U.S. Navy, U.S. Marine Corps, and international allies. Following completion of primary flight training and selection of an advanced training pipeline, Student Naval Aviators are assigned to TW-2 for either intermediate and advanced strike pipeline training or advanced E-2/C-2 training in the T-45C Goshawk jet training aircraft.

TW-2 consists of approximately 200 students, 75 instructors, more than 500 civilian and contract employees, and around 100 T-45C aircraft. TW-2 produces approximately 50% of the U.S. Navy's tailhook pilots, with the other 50% produced at Training Air Wing One stationed at NAS Meridian in Meridian, Mississippi. Following the completion of training with TW-2, Student Naval Aviators are designated Naval Aviators and present with their "Wings of Gold."

On 7 July 2020, Lieutenant JG (junior grade) Madeline Swegle, made history by becoming the U.S. Navy's first African American female tactical jet pilot after completing undergraduate Tactical Air (Strike) pilot training with Training Air Wing Two.

== Subordinate units ==
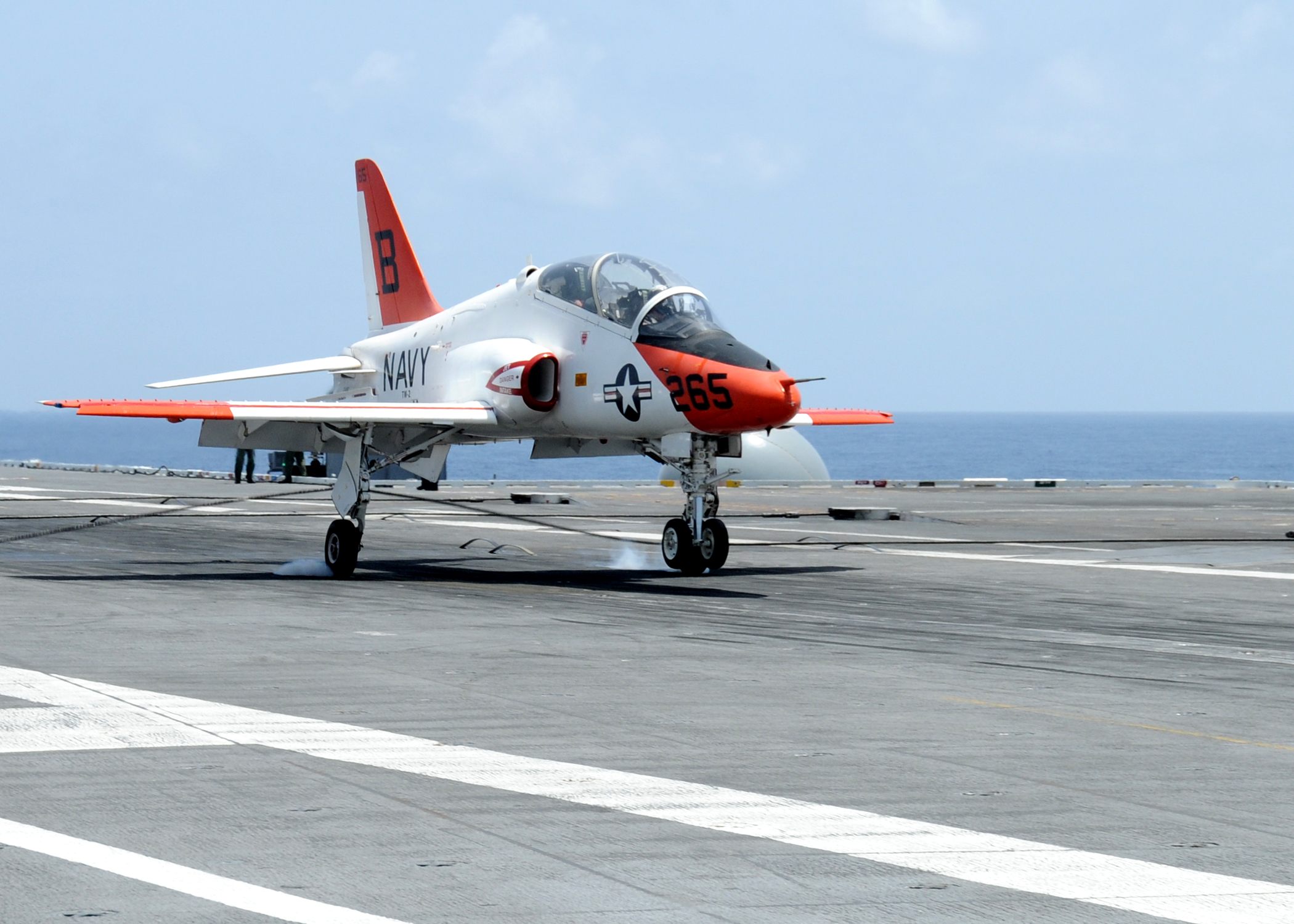
T-45C assigned to TW-2 traps aboard USS George H.W. Bush during Carrier Qualifications

TW-2 consists of two jet intermediate and advanced training squadrons.

Code	Insignia	Squadron	Nickname	Assigned Aircraft
VT-21		Training Squadron 21	Red Hawks	T-45C Goshawk
VT-22		Training Squadron 22	Golden Eagles	T-45C Goshawk

== Current force ==
=== Fixed-wing aircraft ===
- T-45C Goshawk
