= VT-6 =

Training Squadron 6
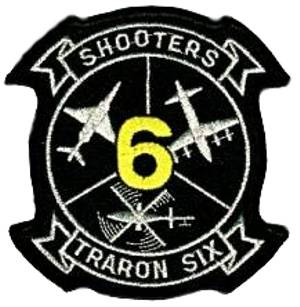
- VT-6 Insignia
- Active: 1 July 1956 - present
- Country: United States of America
- Branch: United States Navy
- Type: Primary Training
- Part of: Training Air Wing Five
- Garrison/HQ: NAS Whiting Field
- Nickname: "Shooters"
- Mottos: "Train Warriors and Develop Leaders."
- Colors: Silver and Black

Commanders
- Commanding Officer: LtCol Kevin M. Rector
- Executive Officer: CDR Little tyke Aldrich

Aircraft flown
- Trainer: TC-45 Expeditor; T-28 Trojan; T-34B Mentor; T-34C Turbo Mentor; T-6B Texan

Training Squadron Six (VT-6) or TRARON SIX, known as the Shooters, callsign "Shooter", is a United States Navy primary training squadron stationed at Naval Air Station Whiting Field flying the T-6B Texan. The Shooters are one of five primary training squadrons in operation today.

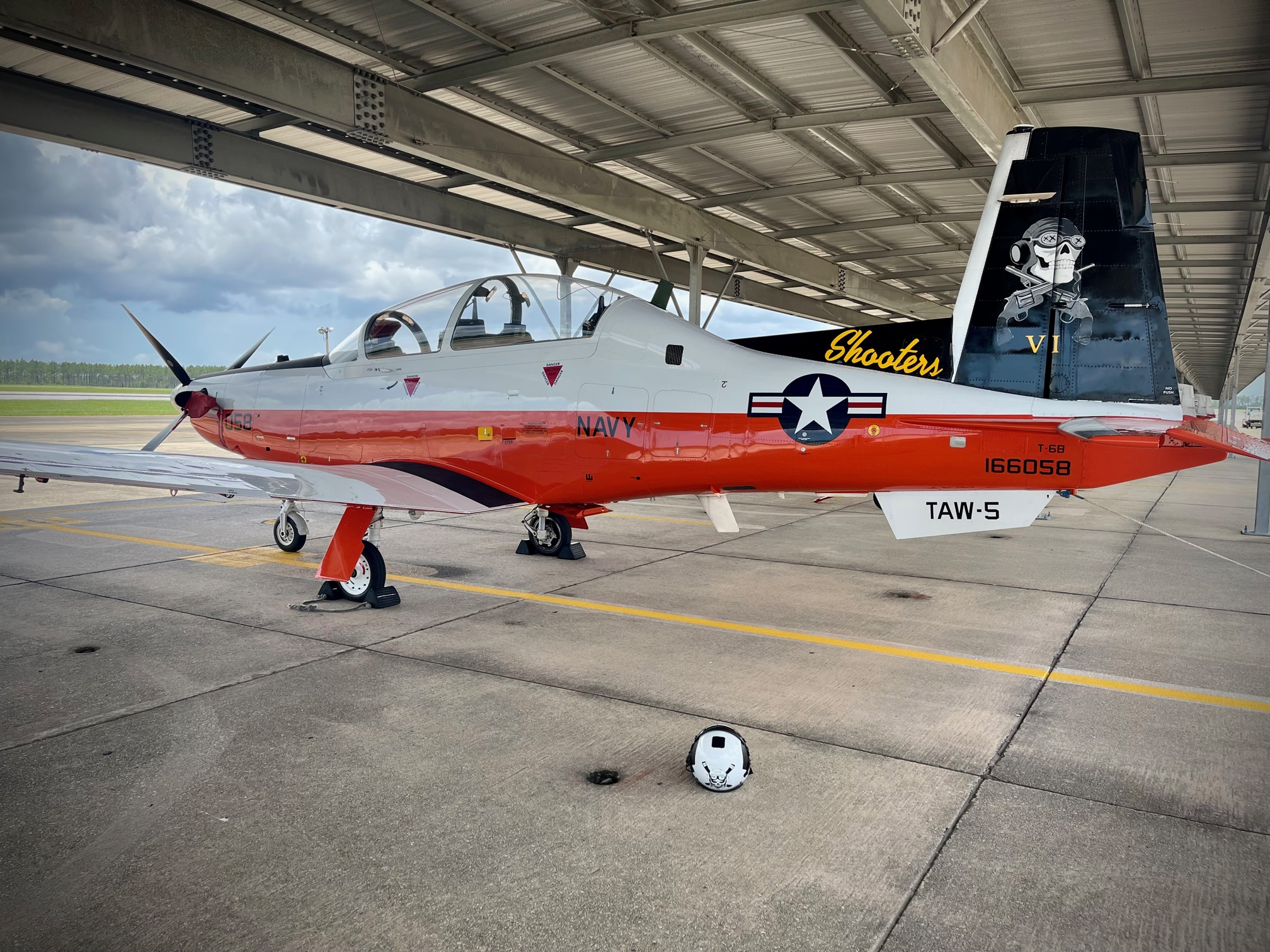
VT-6 Black Tail "Shooter-058"

== History ==
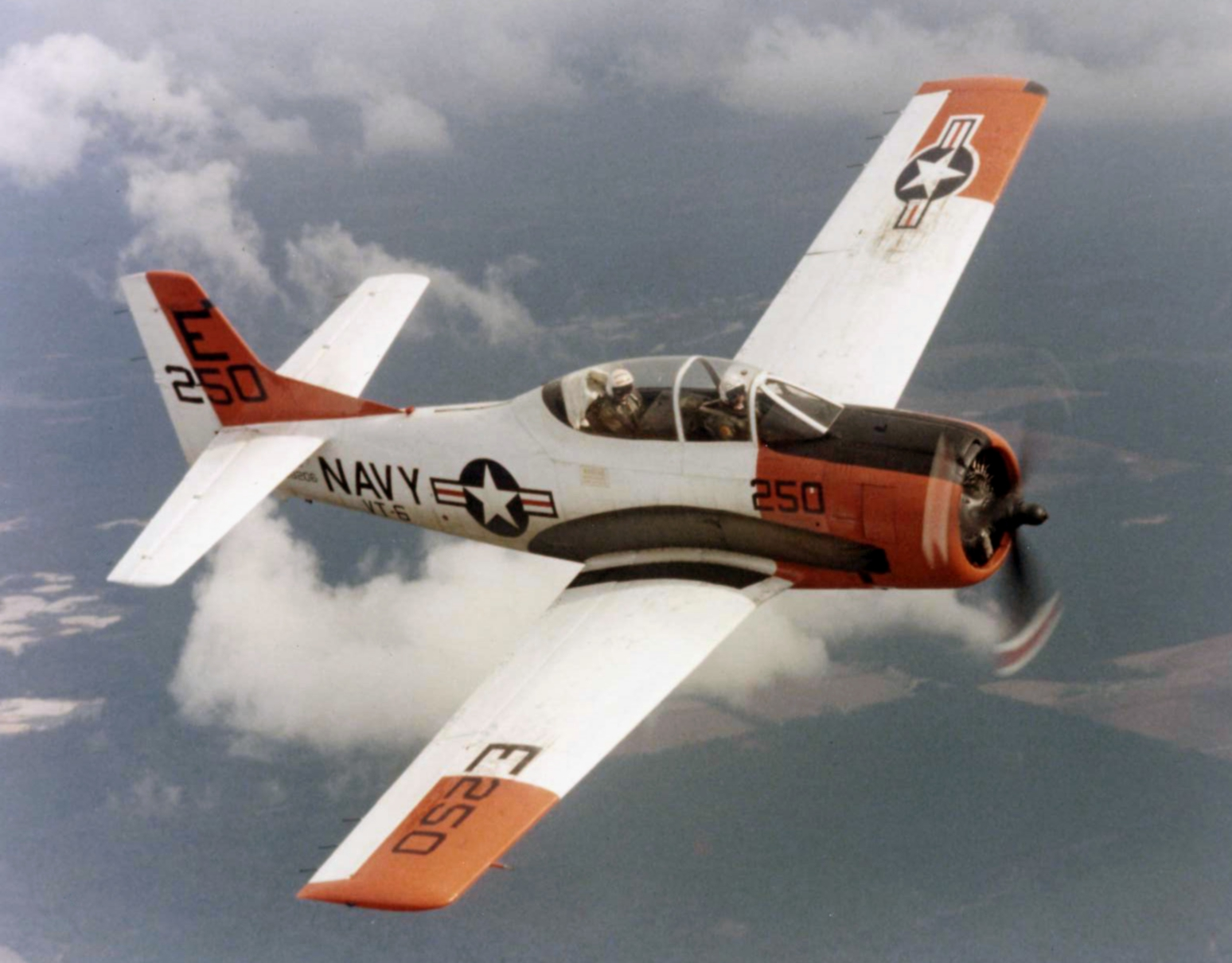
T-28B Trojan assigned to VT-6 in the 1970s

On 1 July 1956, Multi-Engine Training Group (METG) was established at NAS Pensacola. At the time, student aviators would receive primary training in the T-34B and intermediate training in the T-28B/C. On 1 May 1960, METG was redesignated into Training Squadron 6 (VT-6) as a primary squadron stationed aboard NAS Whiting Field in Milton, FL, flying the TC-45. At the time VT-6 provided primary and intermediate flight training for students, as well as advanced flight training for students in the rotary and lighter-than-air pipeline. During the T-28 era, VT-6 functioned as a complete training squadron, primary to advanced. With the introduction of the T-34C and T-6B, the mission of VT-6 shifted to only primary training. Since that time, VT-6 has served as one of five primary training squadrons in the Navy, responsible for initial training of Student Naval Aviators.

== Awards ==
- Chief of Naval Operations Aviation Safety Award, 2005, 2013

== See also ==
- Naval aviation
- Student Naval Aviator
- U.S. Navy Training Squadrons
- Training Air Wing Five
- Naval Air Training Command
