= KAI Aerospace Museum =

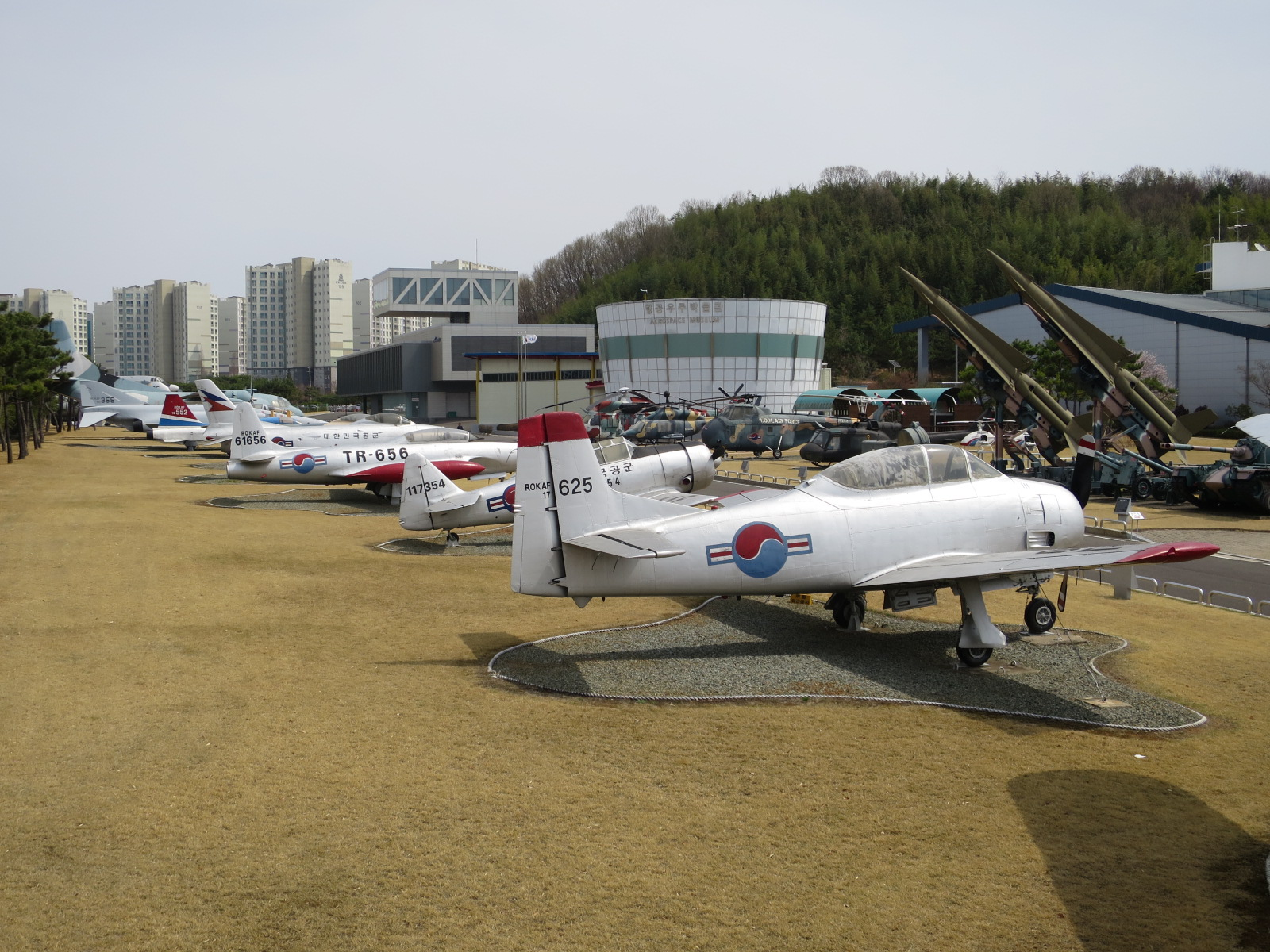
- Aircraft and equipment lineup at the KAI Aerospace Museum

- Location within South Korea
- Established: 1980
- Location: Sacheon, South Korea
- Coordinates: 35.071°N 128.061°E
- Type: Aviation museum
- Website: www.kaimuseum.co.kr

The KAI Aerospace Museum is an aerospace museum in Sacheon, South Korea.

== Aircraft on display ==
=== Helicopters ===
- Bell UH-1B-BF 64-14003 (Construction Number 1127). This helicopter was purchased by the United States Army in April 1965. In October 1970, it joined the 129th Assault Helicopter Company, part of the 10th Combat Aviation Battalion then serving in South Vietnam. 64-14003 flew as a gunship with the 129th AHC until January 1971, logging 150 hours with the unit. At this time, the 129th AHC flew primarily in support of the Capital Infantry Division. 64-14003 was Military Aircraft Storage and Disposition Center (MASDC) on July 14, 1976 before being transferred to the South Korea in 1977. 64-14003 was operated by the ROKAF as a utility and search-and-rescue helicopter until its retirement. The aircraft still wears "공군" markings it wore during its service with the ROKAF.
- Bell 427
- KAI KUH-1 Surion prototype
- KAI LCH prototype
- Sikorsky UH-19D 56-4283 (Manufacturer Number 551179). Built as a H-19D-4-SI Chickasaw, this helicopter was later redesignated as a UH-19D Chickasaw. Some sources say the helicopter was delivered to the U.S. Army on February 28, 1958 and was later transferred to the ROKAF. Other sources suggest this helicopter was operated by the U.S. Air Force prior to its ROKAF service.

=== Fixed-Wing Aircraft ===
- Boeing B-29-90-BW Superfortress 45-21739 (manufacturer number 13633). This aircraft was built at Boeing's Wichita plant in 1945 and it entered service with the USAAF on August 3, 1945. In 1947, this aircraft was sent to the Sacramento Air Material Center to take part in Project DOM-515 Saddletree and be modified to carry nuclear weapons. The aircraft served in the USAF until April 14, 1954, at which point it was retired at Randolph AFB and sent to the B-29 boneyard at NAS China Lake. In March 1972, the aircraft was shipped from China Lake to Seoul in 18 parts and reassembled for display at the War Memorial of Korea in August 1972. It eventually moved to the KAI Museum in 1995. It currently wears the "Circle W" tail insignia of the 92nd Bombardment Group (Medium), which took part in the Korean War when it was based at Yokota, Japan from July 9 to October 25, 1950. This insignia is a post-1960s addition to the aircraft, as is its current nickname, "Unification."
- Bulwaho 1007/K
- Cessna O-1G Bird Dog 53-7995. This aircraft was originally delivered to US Army in 1953. Early in its service career, it was sent back to the Cessna plant in Wichita, Kansas to be modified to the O-1G standard. From June 1967 to March 1972, it flew with the 74th Reconnaissance Airplane Company (RAC) from Phu Loi Base Camp in South Vietnam during the Vietnam War. It was eventually sent to the South Korea as part of the Military Assistance Program (MAP). It was operated by the ROKAF with the serial number 09-995
- Cessna T-37C Tweet 72-1361. This aircraft was built in 1971 and sent to ROKAF, which gave it the serial number 21361.
- Chance Vought F4U-4 Corsair BuNo 81415 (Construction Number 8140). This aircraft was the 651 aircraft of the 2,045 F4U-4 Corsairs built. It was delivered to the U.S. Navy and served until the 1950s. A planned sale to the Honduran Air Force fell through and the aircraft was sold to a collector and left unrestored until 1973 with the civilian registration number N5219V. In 1974, it was acquired and displayed by the War Memorial of Korea in Seoul where it stayed until being transferred to the KAI Aerospace Museum in 2001. It is currently painted in the colors of and markings of Marine Fighter Squadron 312, "The Checkerboards," hence the "WR" squadron code and checked nose and cowling. VMF-312 flew the F4U-4 during the Korean war, losing 15 aircraft on operations. It is one of the other aircraft in the collection that also been featured as a scale model.
- Douglas B-26K Counter Invader 44-34119. This aircraft was originally built as a Douglas A-26B-45-DL Invader. In 1964, the aircraft was rebuilt as an On Mark B-26K Counter Invader and given the new serial number 64-17651 and the "TA651" buzz number. In October 1967, the aircraft was sent to Southeast Asia. It served with the 609th Special Operations Squadron (SOS), 56th Special Operations Wing (SOW) based at Nakhon Phanom Royal Thai Air Force Base in Thailand. While with the unit, it interdicted the Ho Chi Minh Trail and was given the nickname “Mighty Mouse.” When the 609th SOS ended operations in November 1969, the aircraft was returned the Military Aircraft Storage and Disposition Center (MASDC) at Davis Monthan AFB. This aircraft is one of the aircraft in the museum's collection which has also been made into a commercial scale model.
- Douglas EC-47Q 42-93704. This aircraft was built in 1942 as a C-47A-25-DK at the Douglas plant in Oklahoma City, Oklahoma. It was assigned to the USAAF by June 19, 1944 and likely served with the 9th Air Force. It was converted to a VC-47A staff transport in September 1954. Due to demand for electronic intelligence aircraft, it was converted into an EC-47Q electronic surveillance aircraft on March 20, 1968. It arrived at Pleiku Air Base on December 17, 1968 to serve with the 362nd Tactical Electronic Warfare Squadron. By 1973, it had been deployed to Nakhon Phanom Royal Thai Air Force Base with the 361st. The aircraft was nicknamed "Over Torque", after crew chief Sergeant Norman "Over Torque" Ritter. Ritter has earned the nickname after fastening an oil cooler too tightly to an engine prior to a ground test run, which lead to the oil cooler bursting. On July 10, 1975, it was transferred to the ROKAF, where it used the serial number 093-704.
- Douglas C-54G-10-DO Skymaster. This aircraft was built at the Douglas plant in Santa Monica, California in 1945. It was initially operated by the USAF with the serial number 45-0582. It was sent to the Military Aircraft Storage and Disposition Center (MASDC) in Tucson Arizona in September 26, 1969. It was later sent to Korea as part of the Foreign Military Sales program. in ROKAF service, it used the serial number 50582.
- Douglas C-124C Globemaster II 52-0943. This aircraft served with the USAF until being transferred to the Air National Guard in March 1972. In January 1974, it was flown from Oklahoma to Seoul and displayed in Yeouido Plaza. The aircraft had been donated to the UN Korean War Allies Association by the USAF. The aircraft was on display at Yeouido until 1995. It was then moved to Sacheon. It is one of just nine C-124s still surviving and the only one on display outside of the United States.
- Fairchild C-123K Provider 55-4564. This aircraft was originally built as a Fairchild C-123B-14-FA Provider before being converted to C-123K. After serving in the USAF, it was transferred to the Republic of Vietnam Air Force and eventually transferred to the ROKAF.
- Grumman TAF-9J Cougar 141152. Built as a Grumman F9F-8 Cougar, it was later redesignated as a F-9J and operated by VT-22 as a trainer from 1963 to 1969 with the number "3F-210" (the aircraft has since been repainted with the number "3F-219." The aircraft was struck off charge in April 1970 and sent to AMARC and later donated to the museum.
- Lockheed T-33A-1-LO Shooting Star 56-1656. This aircraft was operated by the USAF before being transferred to the ROKAF. It still retains its "TR-656" buzz number.
- McDonnell Douglas F-4E Phantom II. This F-4E-37-MC aircraft was built by McDonnell at its Saint Louis plant in 1968. It was taken into service by the USAF with the serial number 68-0355. During its service life, this aircraft flew with the 35th Tactical Fighter Wing (TFW), 31st TFW, 3rd TFW, and the 57th Fighter Weapons Wing(FWW), before being assigned to the 90th Tactical Fighter Squadron (TFS), 3rd TFW at Clark Air Base in the Philippines. In November 1989, it was transferred to the ROKAF. The aircraft is currently painted with the markings of the ROKAF's 17th Fighter Wing and the serial number 60-355. It was one of the 103 ex-USAF and new-build F-4Es delivered to the ROKAF.
- North American LT-6G Mosquito 117354/TA-354 51-17354 (MSN 195-1). This aircraft was the first of a small batch of 11 aircraft which was remanufactured at North American's Fresno, California plant. These aircraft were upgraded with new equipment, including the RC-103 and the AN/ARN-5 Instrument Landing System (the RC-103 was not fitted to most T-6Gs). This order was issued in March 1952 and the aircraft were intended for the Mutual Defense Assistance Program. However, these aircraft were not immediately sent to the MDMP and instead were sent to various USAF training bases. It was used as an LT-6G forward air control aircraft by the ROKAF.
- North American T-28A Trojan 51-7625. This aircraft was accepted by the USAF and assigned to Kisarazu AB, Japan during its early service life. It was eventually struck off charge on February 9, 1961. Shortly afterwards, it was sent to the ROKAF as part of the Military Assistance Program. The ROKAF changed the aircraft's serial number to 17-625, but retained the "TA-625" buzz number painted on the fuselage.
- North American F-86D-35-NA Sabre 51-8424. This aircraft briefly served with the USAF before becoming one of the 40 F-86D Sabres that were transferred to South Korea starting in June 1955. These aircraft were intended to intercept potential attacks by North Korean Il-28 Beagle bombers.
- North American F-86F Sabre. This aircraft was given the USAF serial number 52-4865 in 1952. It was transferred to the Republic of China Air Force before eventually being transferred to the ROKAF with the serial number 24-865.
- Northrop F-5A. This aircraft is a Northrop F-5A-25-NO Freedom Fighter, which was given the USAF serial number 65-10552. After being given to the ROKAF under the Military Assistance Program, it was renumbered 51-522. It the final aircraft in the museum which has also been featured as a commercial scale model.
- KAI KF-16A Fighting Falcon 92-000
- T-103
