= Madeline Swegle =

American pilot

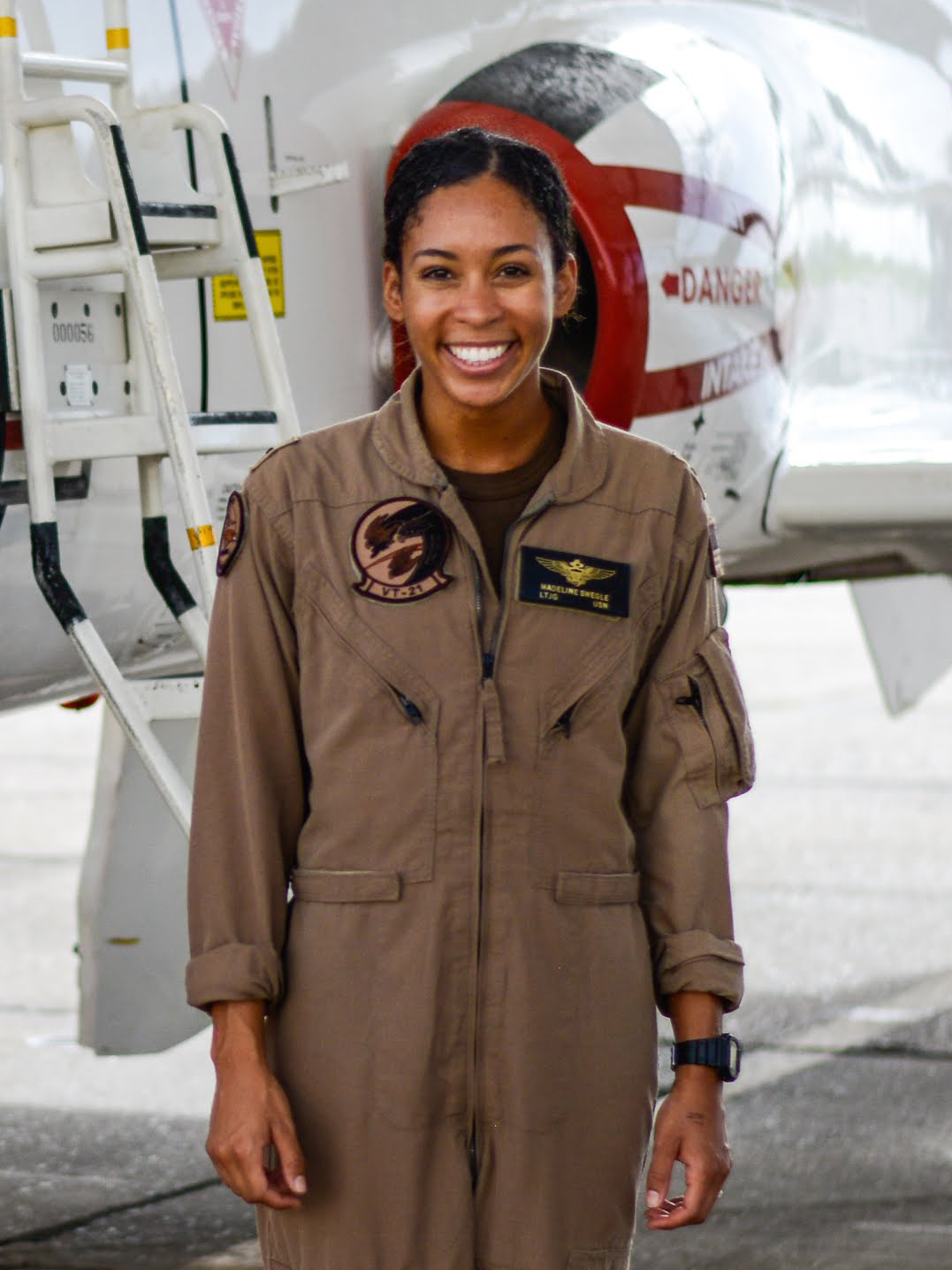
- Born: Madeline Manhertz
- Occupation: Naval Aviator
- Military Career
- Allegiance: United States
- Branch: U.S. Navy
- Rank: Lieutenant
- Alma mater: US Naval Academy

Madeline Swegle (formerly Madeline Manhertz) is a United States Naval Aviator. She is the U.S. Navy's first black female tactical jet pilot.

== Career ==
Swegle is currently a Lieutenant in the U.S. Navy. She is from Burke, Virginia.

She is a 2013 graduate of Lake Braddock Secondary School and a 2017 graduate of the U.S. Naval Academy. She participated in track and field throughout her time in high school and college.

She reported to VT-21 in Kingsville, Texas to complete the Tactical Air Strike pilot training syllabus, which she completed on July 7, 2020, making her the first black female tactical jet pilot in the U.S. Navy.

== See also ==
- History of the United States Navy
- List of women's firsts
- Women in war
