= Training Air Wing Five =

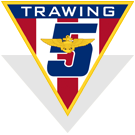
- TW-5 Insignia
- Active: January 1972 - Present
- Country: United States of America
- Branch: United States Navy
- Part of: Naval Air Training Command
- Garrison/HQ: Naval Air Station Whiting Field
- Tail Code: E

Commanders
- Current commander: CAPT Kenny Kerr, USN

Training Air Wing Five (TW-5 or TRAWING 5) is a United States Navy aircraft training air wing based at Naval Air Station Whiting Field, in Milton, FL. TW-5 is one of five training wings in the Naval Air Training Command, and consists of three fixed-wing primary training squadrons and three rotary-wing advanced training squadrons. The wing trains Student Naval Aviators from the U.S. Navy, U.S. Marine Corps, and U.S. Coast Guard, as well as international allies with instructors of varying backgrounds and seniority from the aforementioned military branches.

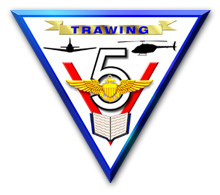
Former insignia of Training Air Wing Five

According to the Chief of Naval Air Training (CNATRA), TW-5 accounts for roughly 43% of all flight time within the Naval Air Training Command, and 11% of the Navy and Marine Corps' flight time worldwide. Approximately 1,200 students complete flight training with TW-5 annually.

== Subordinate units ==
TW-5 consists of three fixed-wing primary training squadrons and three rotary-wing advanced training squadrons which train Student Naval Aviators of the Navy, Marine Corps and Coast Guard, and foreign students under the Foreign Military Sales program. Additionally there are two Instructor Training Units (Fixed Wing Instructor Training Unit (FITU) and Helicopter Instructor Training Unit (HITU)) that train Instructors Under Training (IUT)s qualifying them as Instructor Pilots.

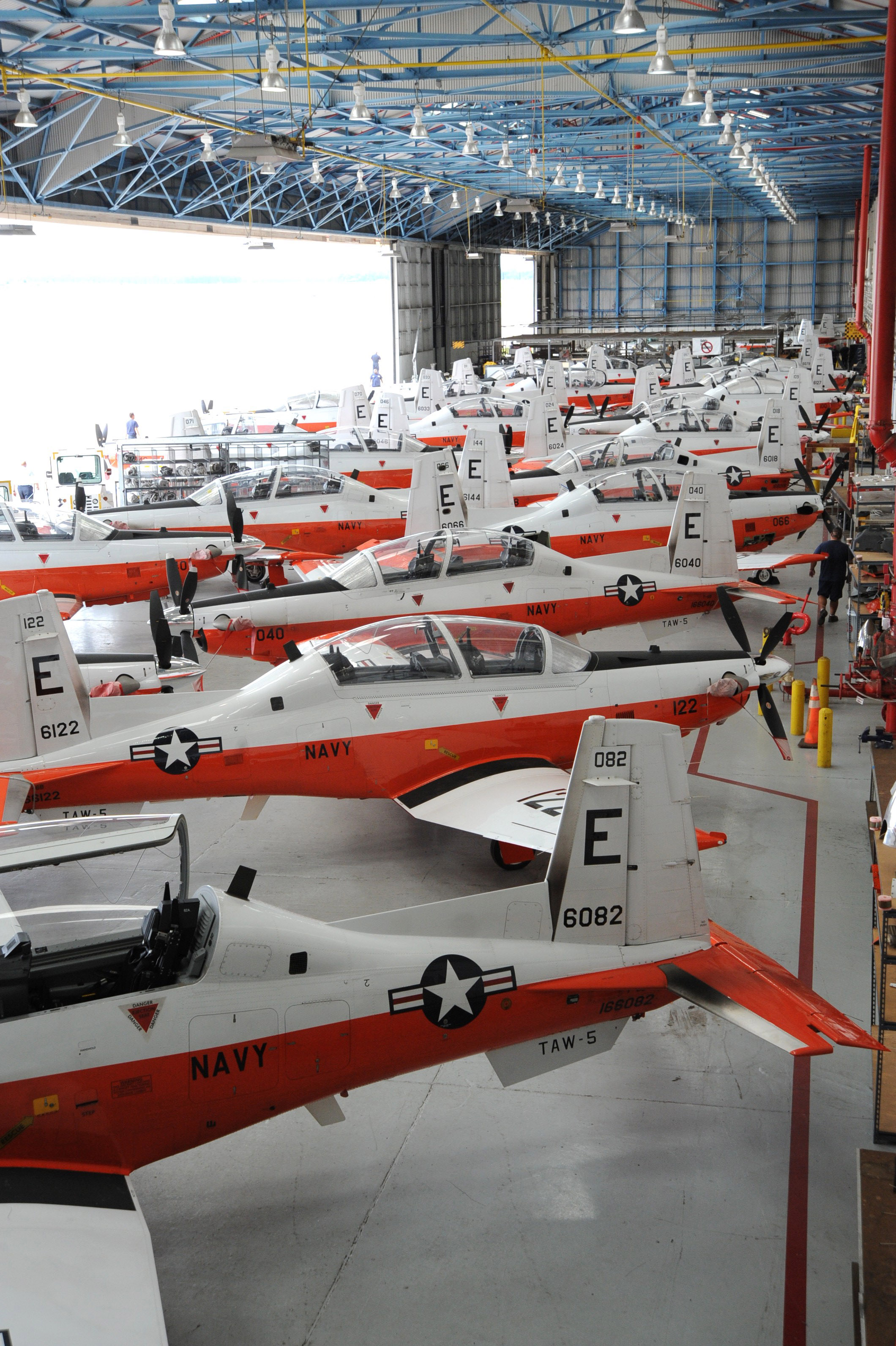
T-6Bs from TW-5 in hangar at NAS Whiting Field in 2012.

Code	Insignia	Squadron	Nickname	Assigned Aircraft
VT-2		Training Squadron 2	Doerbirds	T-6B Texan II
VT-3		Training Squadron 3	Red Knights	T-6B Texan II
VT-6		Training Squadron 6	Shooters	T-6B Texan II
HT-8		Helicopter Training Squadron 8	Eightballers	TH-73A Thrasher
HT-18		Helicopter Training Squadron 18	Vigilant Eagles	TH-73A Thrasher
HT-28		Helicopter Training Squadron 28	Hellions	TH-73A Thrasher

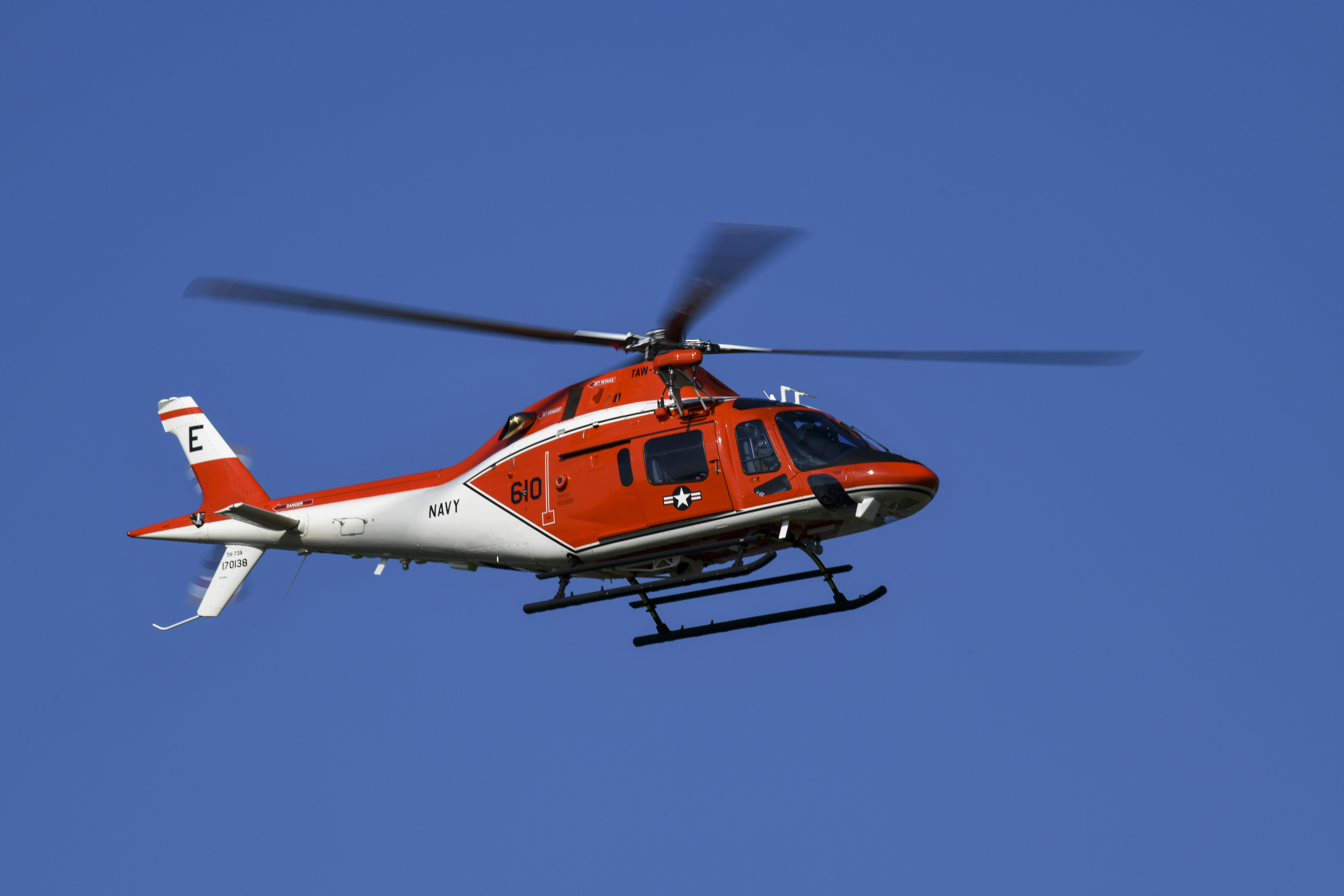
TH-73A Thrasher

== Current force ==
=== Fixed-wing aircraft ===
- T-6B Texan

=== Rotary wing aircraft ===
- TH-73 Thrasher
