= VT-22 =

Training Squadron 22
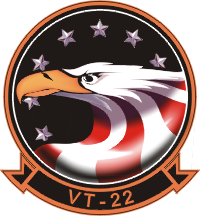
- VT-22 Logo
- Active: 13 June 1949 - Present
- Country: United States of America
- Branch: United States Navy
- Type: Advanced Jet Strike Training
- Part of: Training Air Wing Two
- Garrison/HQ: NAS Kingsville
- Nickname(s): "Golden Eagles", ATC callsign "BLAZER"
- Colors: Gold and Blue

Commanders
- Current commander: CDR Nathan O'Kelly, USN

Aircraft flown
- Trainer: TV-1; F9F-88/8T Cougar; TA-4J Skyhawk; T-45A/C Goshawk

Training Squadron 22 (VT-22) or TRARON TWO TWO, known as the Golden Eagles, callsign "Blazer", is a U.S. Navy strike jet training squadron stationed aboard Naval Air Station Kingsville, flying the T-45C Goshawk. The Golden Eagles are one of four strike jet training squadrons in operation today, and are under the command of Training Air Wing Two.

== History ==
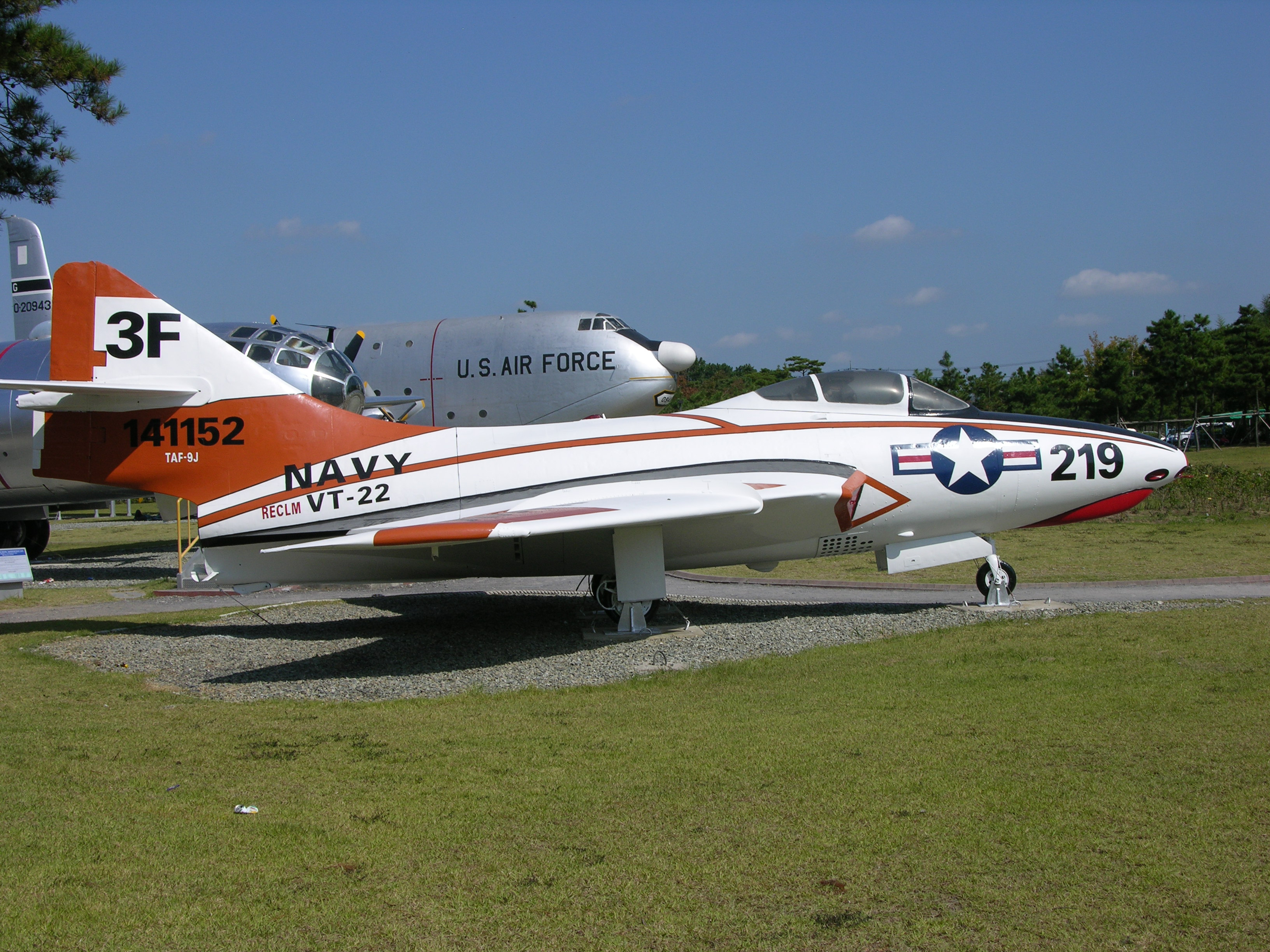
TAF-8J Cougar on display KAI Aerospace Museum in South Korea originally assigned to VT-22

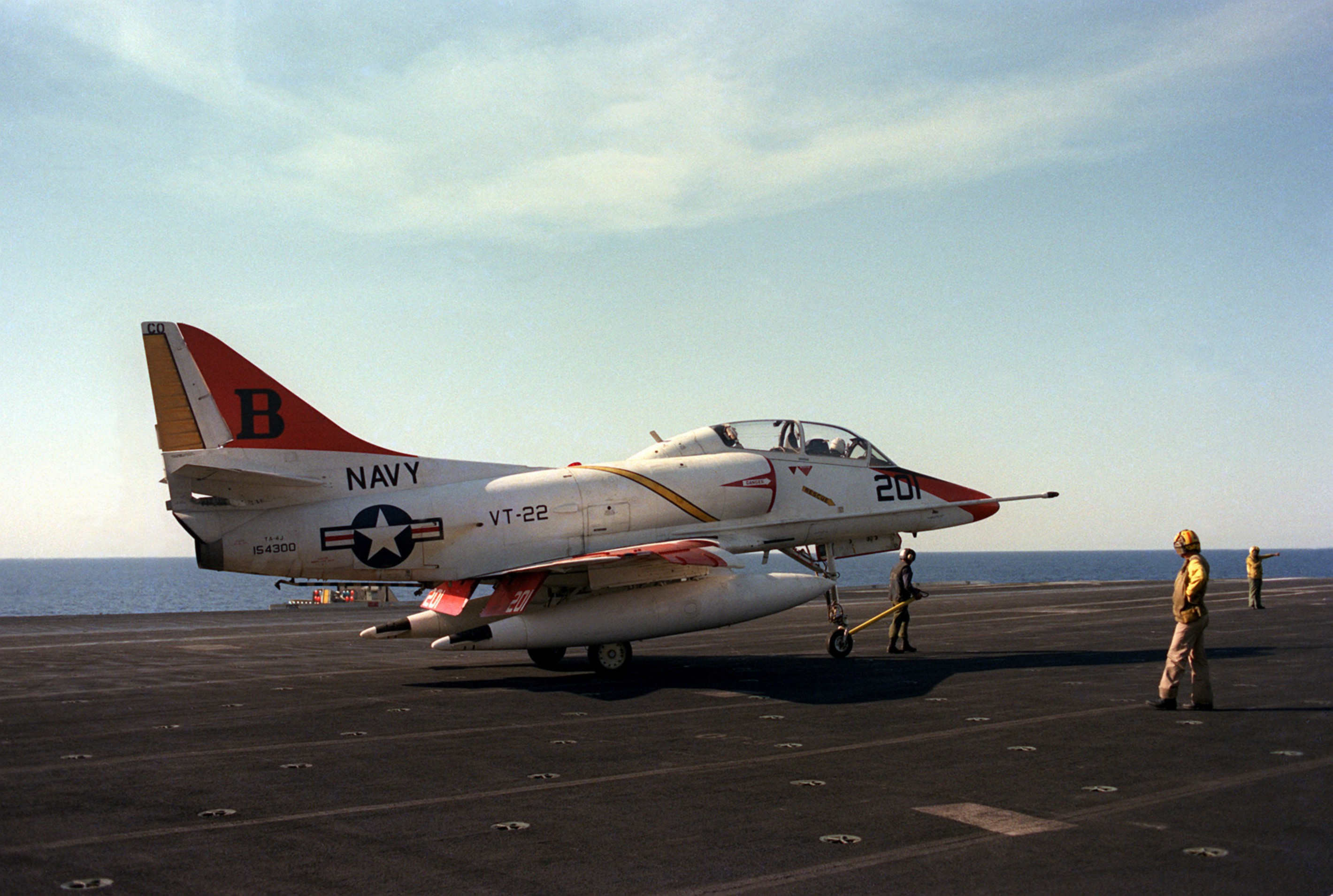
A VT-22 TA-4J Skyhawk on the flight deck of USS Kitty Hawk in 1983

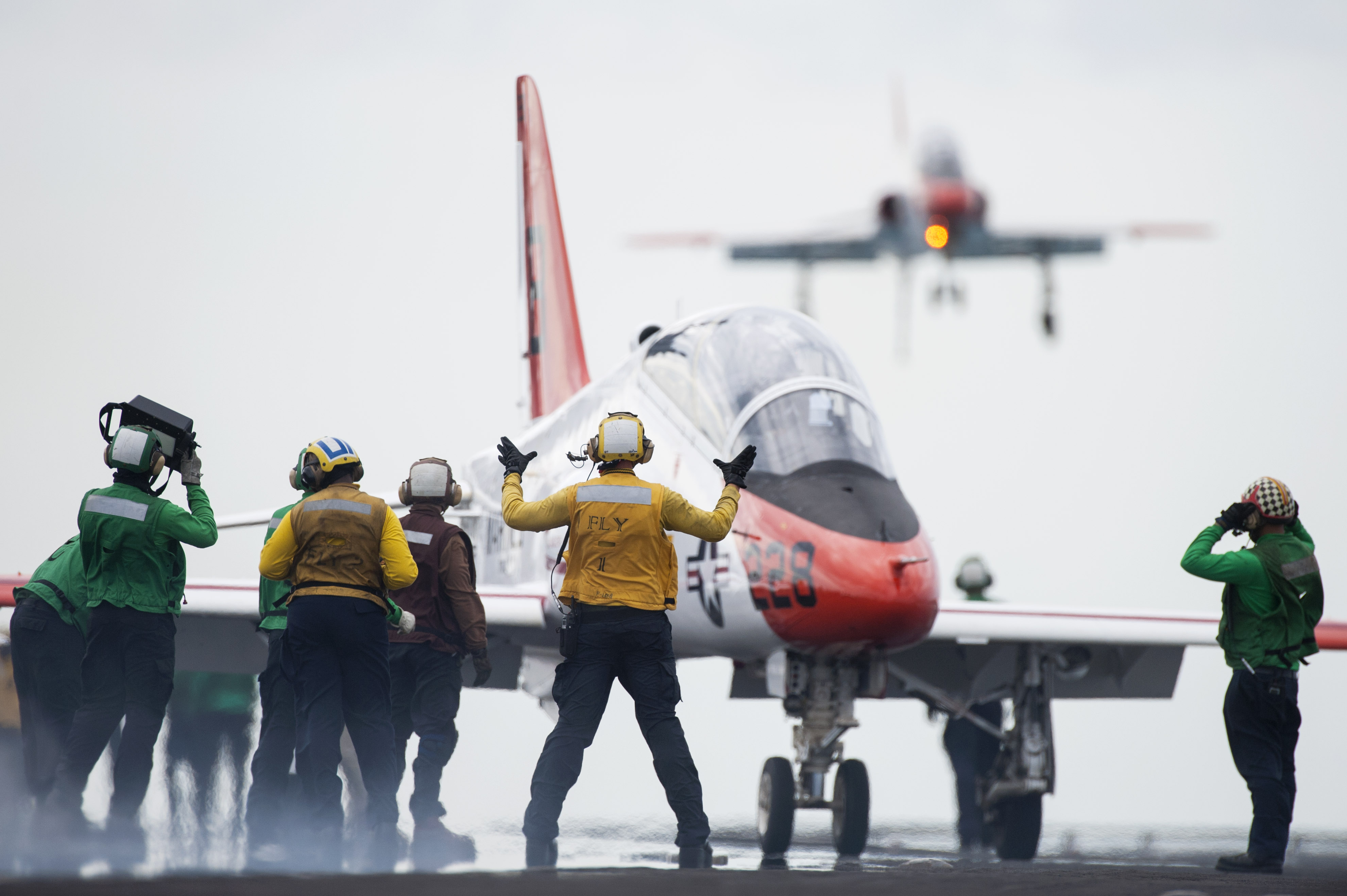
Crew aboard USS Harry S. Truman direct a VT-22 T-45C Goshawk during carrier qualification in 2014

Training Squadron 22 began as Advanced Training Unit 6 (ATU-6), formed on 13 June 1949 at Naval Air Station Corpus Christi, entrusted with training newly designated Naval Aviators transitioning to jets. ATU-6 flew the TV-1 trainer aircraft, and was the first unit to train Naval Aviators in jet aircraft. That same year, ATU-6 was relocated to Naval Air Station Whiting Field in Milton, Florida, and redesignated as Jet Transitional Training Unit 1 (JTTU-1). JTTU-1 was tasked with not only training new Naval Aviators, but fleet aviators as well, including the Blue Angels during their transition to jet aircraft in the 1940s.

In 1951, JTTU-1 relocated again to the newly formed Naval Auxiliary Air Station Kingsville (now Naval Air Station Kingsville), where it was re-designated as Advanced Training Unit 3 (ATU-3), and then later in 1952 as Advanced Training Unit 200 (ATU-200). The mission of ATU-200 was training newly designated naval aviators in jet familiarization, formation tactics, instruments, and navigation. ATU-200 was again re-designated as Advanced Training Unit 212 (ATU-212), expanding its training to include all-weather training as well. In 1958, ATU-212 began transitioning from the TV-1 trainer aircraft to the newly procured F9F-88/8T Cougar. With the new aircraft, the training of ATU-212 expanded to include ordnance delivery and carrier qualification.

In 1960, ATU-212 was re-designated to its current name, Training Squadron 22 (VT-22). In 1970, VT-22 began transitioning to the Navy's new jet trainer, the TA-4J Skyhawk. VT-22 functioned as the advanced training squadron at NAS Kingsville, training student naval aviators in the final areas of training before transitioning to fleet assignments. In 1994, VT-22 began transitioning to the current trainer aircraft in use, the T-45A Goshawk. With the change in aircraft, VT-22's training role changed from solely advanced training, to include intermediate training and familiarization flying in jet aircraft. More recently, several upgrades were made to the trainer aircraft, resulting in its re-designation as the T-45C.

== Mission ==
Today, VT-22's mission is to train future U.S. Navy and Marine Student Naval Aviators, along with aviators of allies of the United States. Navy and Marine students are selected from top performing students who have completed primary flight training in the T-6B at either Naval Air Station Whiting Field or Naval Air Station Corpus Christi. After joining VT-22, students are trained in the T-45C over a 12 month long syllabus consisting of over 130 flights in the aircraft, accumulating over 160 hours. The training syllabus culminates with carrier landing qualification or basic fighter maneuvering ("dogfighting"). Upon completion of the training syllabus, Student Naval Aviators assigned to VT-22 are designated as Naval Aviators and earn their "Wings of Gold" and receive follow-on assignments with Fleet Replacement Squadrons before their first fleet tour.

== See also ==
- History of the United States Navy
- List of United States Navy aircraft squadrons
