= Naval Air Station Kingsville =

US Navy training base in Texas

- Near Kingsville, Texas in the United States
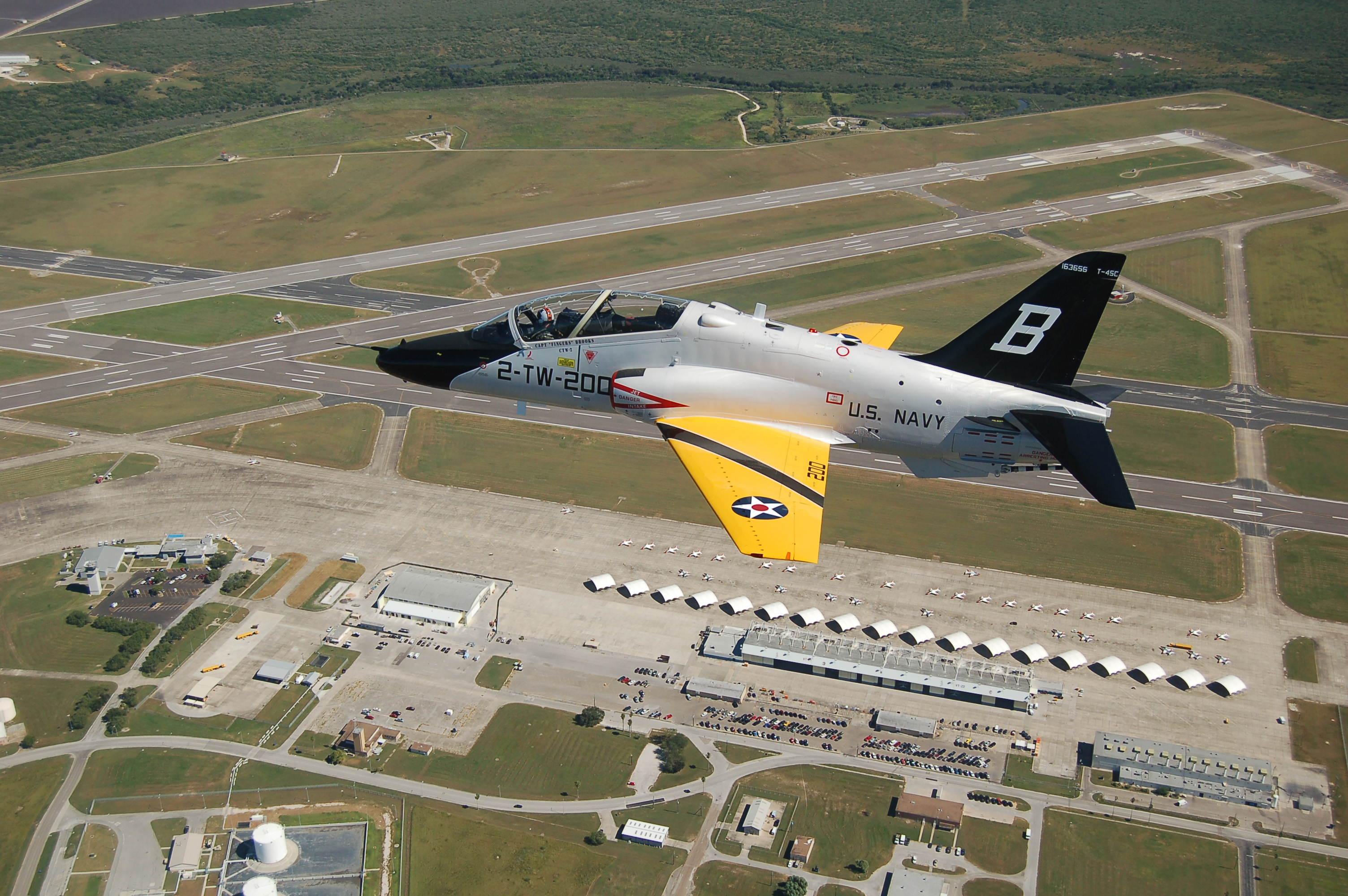
- A T-45C Goshawk painted in pre-World War II tactical colors in celebration of the Centennial of Naval Aviation, flies over NAS Kingsville during 2010

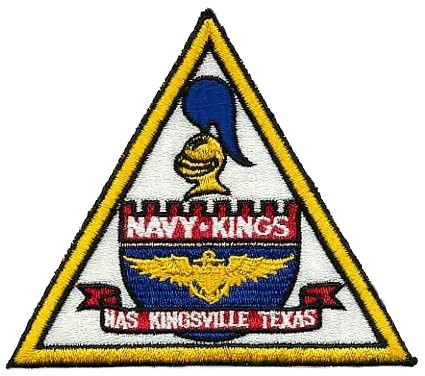

Site information
- Type: Naval Air Station
- Owner: Department of Defense
- Operator: US Navy
- Controlled by: Navy Region Southeast
- Condition: Operational
- Website: Official website

Location
- Location in the United States
- Coordinates: 27°30′16″N 97°48′29″W

Site history
- Built: 1942
- In use: 1942 – present

Garrison information
- Current commander: Captain Eric Bromley
- Garrison: Training Air Wing Two

Airfield information
- Identifiers: IATA: NQI, ICAO: KNQI, FAA LID: NQI, WMO: 722516
- Elevation: 15.2 metres (50 ft) AMSL
Runways
Direction	Length and surface
17L/35R	2,438.7 metres (8,001 ft) Porous European Mix (PEM)
17R/35L	2,438.4 metres (8,000 ft) PEM
13L/31R	2,438.4 metres (8,000 ft) PEM
13R/31L	2,438.4 metres (8,000 ft) PEM

Naval Air Station Kingsville or NAS Kingsville (NASK) (IATA: NQI, ICAO: KNQI, FAA LID: NQI) is a United States Navy Naval Air Station located approximately 3 miles east of Kingsville, Texas in Kleberg County. NAS Kingsville is under the jurisdiction of Navy Region Southeast and is the headquarters of Training Air Wing Two. The station also operates a nearby satellite airfield, NALF Orange Grove.

== History ==
Commissioned on 4 July 1942 as Naval Auxiliary Air Station (NAAS) Kingsville, it served nearby Naval Air Station Corpus Christi as an auxiliary field, aiding in training many of the U.S Navy's pilots for World War II. At the start of the Korean War in 1951, it was re-commissioned as an auxiliary field for NAS Corpus Christi, and as a permanent component of the Naval Aeronautical shore establishment. In this year, the first jet training class begun on July 15. Some of the Kingsville Naval Auxiliary Fields were assigned to NAAS Kingsville. In 1968, the airfield was redesignated as Naval Air Station Kingsville, and has hosted flight training operations throughout its existence. Additionally, NAS Kingsville organizes and hosts the annual Wings Over South Texas Air Show.

== Current operations ==
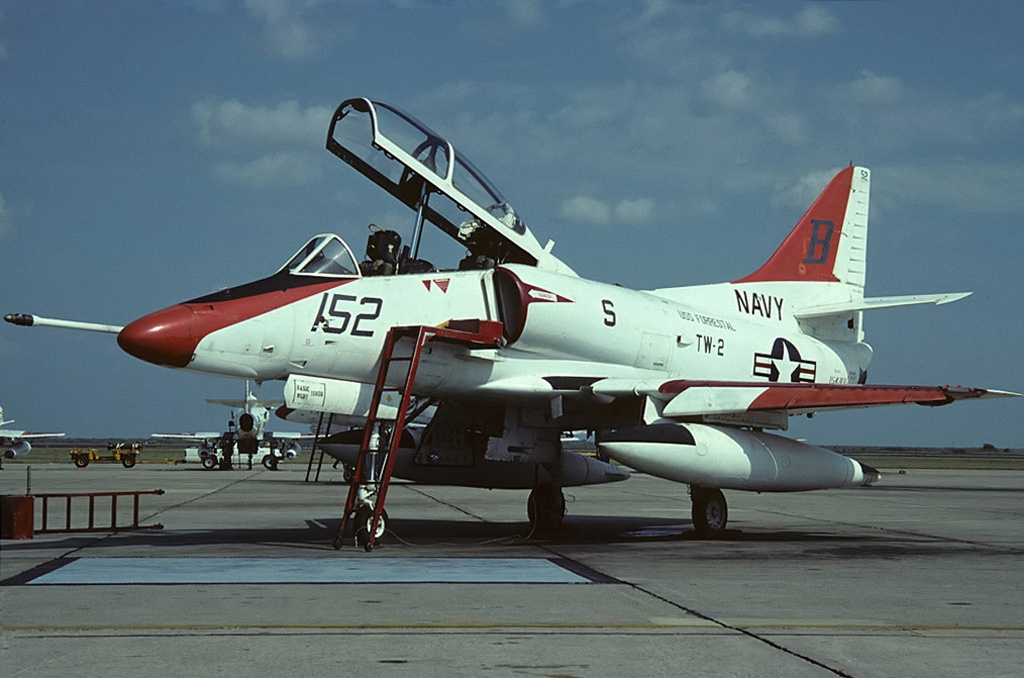
TA-4J Skyhawk of TW-2.

Naval Air Station Kingsville is one of the U.S. Navy’s premier locations for jet aviation training. The naval air station’s primary mission is to train Student Naval Aviators for the United States Navy and United States Marine Corps and tactical jet pilots for other select NATO and Allied countries. To accomplish its mission, NAS Kingsville is home to Training Air Wing Two and several tenant commands, military as well as civilian, with a total complement of approximately 300 officers, 200 enlisted, 350 civilian personnel, and 625 contract maintenance personnel. The wing was the first in the Navy to operate the Boeing T-45 Goshawk aircraft, providing a single carrier-capable aircraft to replace the North American Rockwell T-2 Buckeye and the McDonnell Douglas TA-4 Skyhawk II in the Navy's strike pilot training pipeline. Originally equipped with the T-45A model of the Goshawk, the wing began accepting new production T-45C model aircraft in 2005, which replaces the earlier T-45A aircraft's analog cockpit with a digital or "glass" cockpit similar to what students will find when they transition to operational fleet combat aircraft. All T-45A aircraft at NAS Kingsville are slated to be retrofitted and upgraded to a T-45C configuration under the T-45 Required Avionics Modernization Program (T-45 RAMP), with a select number of RAMP modified aircraft slated for transfer to Training Air Wing SIX at NAS Pensacola, Florida in support of Student Naval Flight Officer training under the Undergraduate Military Flight Officer (UMFO) program.

NAS Kingsville is home to the United States Army Reserve 812th Quartermaster Company.

The NAS Kingsville Operations Department operates the airfield and provides services to support operations of activity, tenant, and transiting aircraft; provides firefighting functions, both structural fire and rescue; provides air traffic control; operates the air terminal; schedules administrative and proficiency flights; repairs and maintains station ground electronics equipment; stores, maintains, and issues assigned ordnance and munitions; operates firing ranges; operates aerial targets, bombing ranges, and auxiliary landing fields. NAS Kingsville also has both Military and Civilian security which man the entry control points and conduct vehicle inspections and patrols.

== Tenant Units ==
- Training Air Wing Two
  - Training Squadron 21 (VT-21) "Fighting Redhawks"
  - Training Squadron 22 (VT-22) "Golden Eagles"
- Naval Branch Health Clinic Kingsville
- Contract Employers included L-3 Vertex, Fidelity Technologies, and Rolls-Royce
- NATRACOM Detachment
- U.S. Army Reserve 812th Quartermaster Company

== Former Tenant Units ==
- 7th Battalion, 158th Aviation Regiment, F Company (MEDEVAC)
- Training Squadron Twenty Three (VT23)"Professionals"

== See also ==
- List of T-45 Goshawk losses
- List of United States Navy airfields
