= VT-21 =

Training Squadron 21
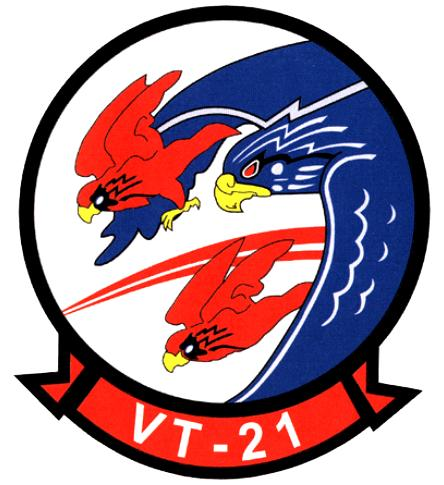
- VT-21 Logo
- Active: 13 June 1949 - Present
- Country: United States of America
- Branch: United States Navy
- Type: Advanced Jet Strike Training
- Part of: Training Air Wing Two
- Garrison/HQ: NAS Kingsville
- Nickname(s): "Redhawks"

Commanders
- Current commander: CDR William M. Rietveld

Aircraft flown
- Trainer: T-45C Goshawk

Training Squadron 21 (VT-21), known as the Redhawks, is a U.S. Navy strike jet training squadron stationed aboard Naval Air Station Kingsville, Texas flying the T-45C Goshawk. The Redhawks are one of four strike jet training squadrons in operation today, and are under the command of Training Air Wing Two.

== History ==
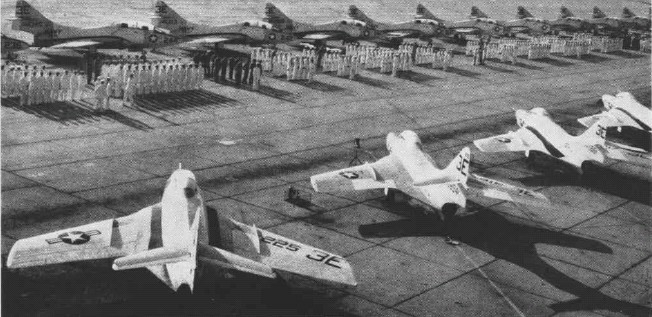
VT-21 TF-9J Cougars at Naval Auxiliary Air Station Kingsville

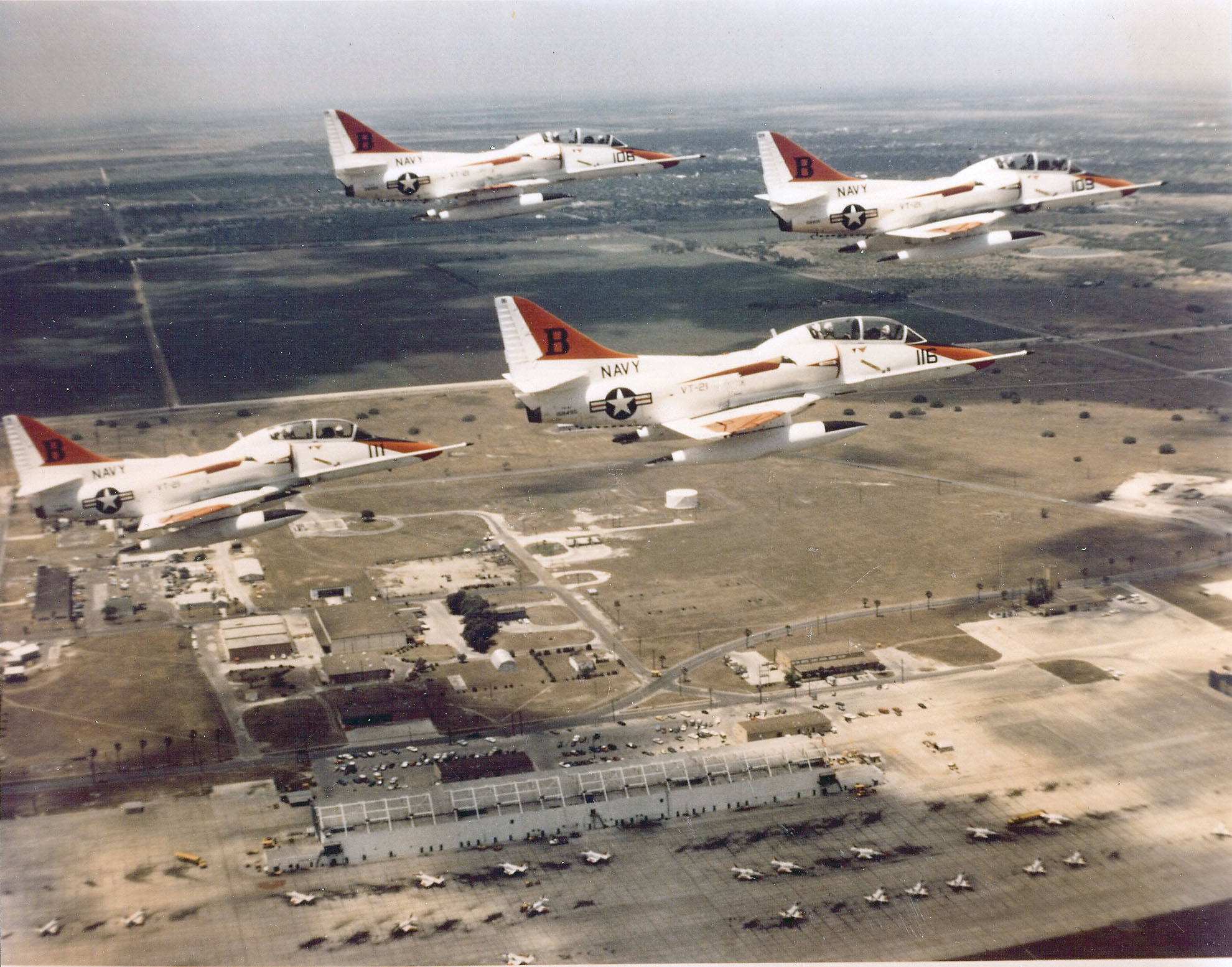
Four U.S. Navy Douglas TA-4J Skyhawks of Training Squadron VT-21 Redhawks in formation

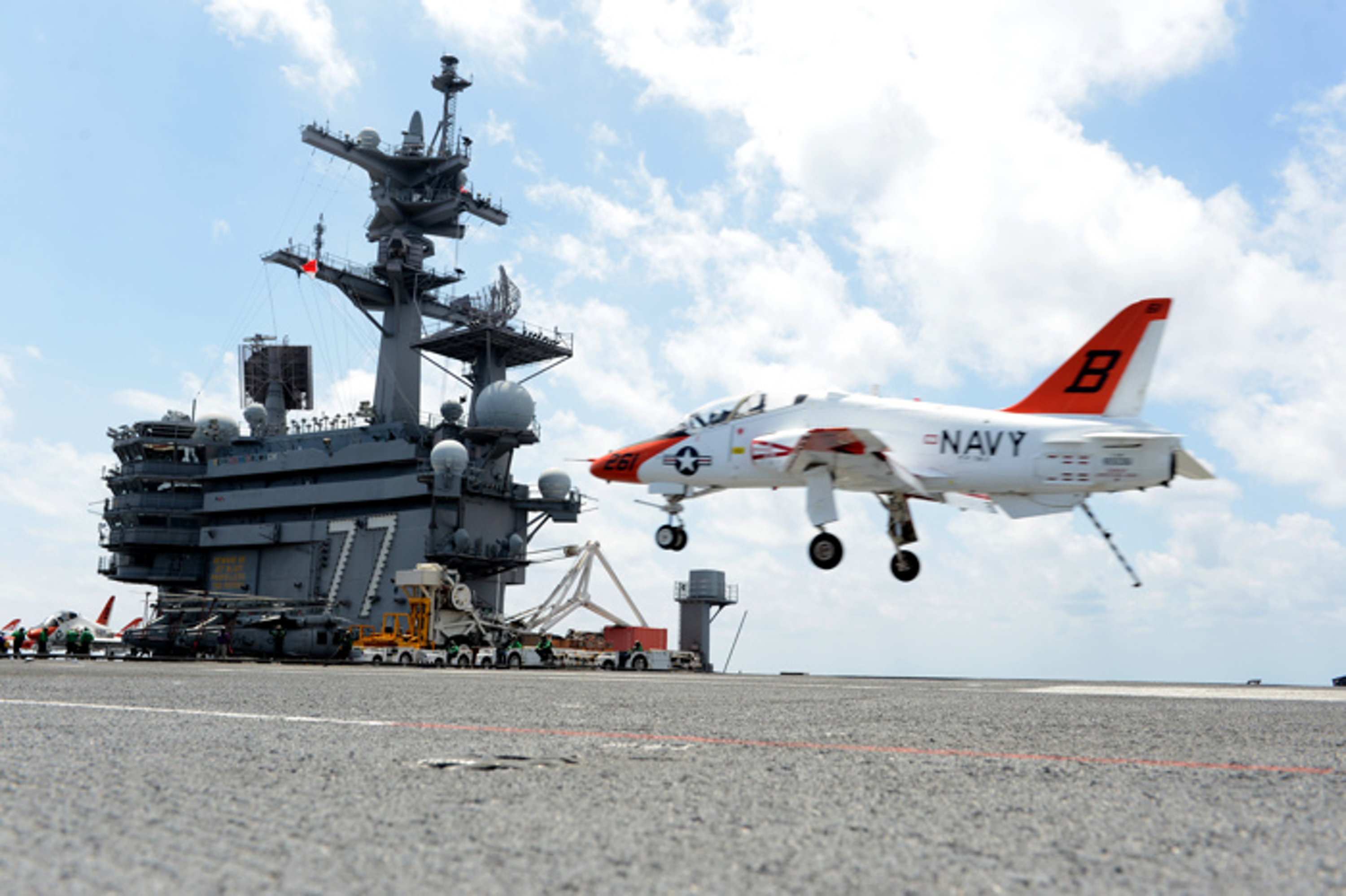
A VT-21 T-45C Goshawk prepares to land on the aircraft carrier USS George H.W. Bush (CVN 77) 24 April 2013

Training squadron VT-21 was originally established as advanced training unit two-zero-two (ATU-202) in April 1951, the squadron was re-designated as Flight Training Squadron-Two One on 21 May 1960. The first Navy and Marine Corps students were trained in the F-6F Hellcat. In May 1954, the squadron transitioned to its first jet aircraft, the F-9F Panther with the squadron later operating the F-9F8 Cougar from January 1958.

In 1968, the squadron was awarded the Admiral John H. Towers Flight Safety award for superior performance by beating all 19 CNATRA (Chief of Naval Air Training) jet and propeller training squadrons. On 4 June 1969, VT-21 received its first Douglas TA-4J Skyhawk and on 8 June 1970 the Douglas TA-4F Skyhawk entered squadron service.

In 1961, the squadron became the first advanced jet training squadron to accomplish over 15,000 consecutive accident free hours. In February 1992, the Redhawks began transitioning to the T-45 Goshawk.

VT-21 have also trained international naval pilots. VT-21 began training Indian Student Naval Aviators in 2006 and graduated the first class for the Indian Navy in 2007. In addition, VT-21 has also trained student Naval Aviators from France and, most recently, Brazil. The squadron is kept busy and annually logs more than 23,000 flight hours and completes more than 11,500 student syllabus events flying the T-45C.

== Mission ==
Today, VT-21's mission is to train future U.S. Navy and Marine Student Naval Aviators, along with aviators of allies of the United States. Navy and Marine students are selected from top performing students who have completed primary flight training in the T-6B at either Naval Air Station Whiting Field or Naval Air Station Corpus Christi.

After joining VT-21, students are trained in the T-45C over a 12 month long syllabus consisting of over 130 flights in the aircraft, accumulating over 160 hours. The training syllabus culminates with carrier landing qualification or basic fighter maneuvering ("dogfighting"). Upon completion of the training syllabus, Student Naval Aviators assigned to VT-21 are designated as Naval Aviators and earn their "Wings of Gold" and receive follow-on assignments with Fleet Replacement Squadrons before their first fleet tour.

== See also ==
- History of the United States Navy
- List of United States Navy aircraft squadrons
