= HT-18 =

Helicopter Training Squadron 18
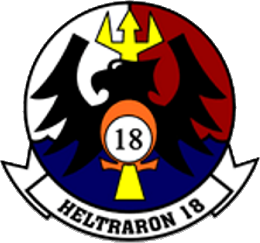
- HT-18 Insignia
- Active: 1 March 1972 - present
- Country: United States of America
- Branch: United States Navy
- Type: Rotary Training
- Size: Approximately 290
- Part of: Training Air Wing Five
- Garrison/HQ: NAS Whiting Field
- Nickname: "Vigilant Eagles"
- Colors: Red, blue, and white
- Anniversaries: March 1, 1972

Commanders
- Current commander: CDR T. C. Viger

Insignia
- Call sign: "Factory Hand"

Helicopter Training Squadron EIGHTEEN (HT-18) is a United States Navy helicopter training squadron based at Naval Air Station Whiting Field in Milton, Florida. The squadron's mission is helicopter pilot training for U. S. Navy, U. S. Marine Corps and U. S. Coast Guard Student Naval Aviators and for selected foreign military flight students from basic helicopter flight training through winging, the squadron also provides indoctrination flights for Midshipmen and Flight Surgeons. Student Naval Aviators report to HT-18 for helicopter training upon completion of primary flight training conducted in the T-6B Texan II U. S. Navy primary flight trainer. HT-18 flies the Leonardo TH-73 Thrasher. The Squadron's nickname is "Vigilant Eagles"

== Mission ==
Transition student aviators through basic and advanced rotary wing pilot training.

== History ==
Helicopter Training Squadron EIGHTEEN (HT-18) was established on 1 March 1972 to assume the role of advanced helicopter pilot training from the existing Helicopter Training Squadron EIGHT (HT-8) leaving HT-8 as the basic phase training squadron. The establishment of HT-18 was necessary to meet the increasing requirements for helicopter trained pilots in the expanding helicopter community of the Navy, Marine Corps, and Coast Guard. The squadron was initially equipped with TH-1L Iroquois helicopters from HT-8. In the early 1980s the squadron's TH-1Ls were replaced with a fully instrumented version of the popular commercial Bell 206 Jet Ranger designated the TH-57C Sea Ranger. HT-18's sister squadron HT-8 had been operating a non-instrumented version of the TH-57 designated the TH-57A Sea Ranger since the late 1960s for basic helicopter training.

On 7 October 1985, HT-8 and HT-18 became "mirror" squadrons with both squadrons conducting training from basic through advanced training and awarding of wings with both squadrons using the TH-57A for basic phases and the TH-57C for advanced phases. By the end of the 80s the TH-57A had been replaced by a version of the Bell 206B-3 designated the TH-57B Sea Ranger. From the late 1980s until 2024, HT-18 has been training and winging Navy, Marine Corps, Coast Guard and select foreign military pilots using the TH-57B basic helicopter trainer and the TH-57C advanced helicopter trainer. In 2024, transitioned to the TH-73 Thrasher and current employs it as its sole advanced helicopter training aircraft.

In both 2002 and 2019, Helicopter Training Squadron 18 received the Adm. John H. Towers Flight Safety Award from The Order of Daedalians for their safety record.

== See also ==
- History of the United States Navy
- Naval aviation
- List of United States Navy aircraft squadrons
