= Naval aviator (United States) =

Officer qualified as a crewed aircraft pilot in the US Navy or US Marine Corps

United States Naval Aviator Insignia; the insignia is worn as a breast badge by qualified crewed aircraft pilots of the U.S. Navy, U.S. Marine Corps, and U.S. Coast Guard

A naval aviator is a commissioned officer or warrant officer qualified as a crewed aircraft pilot in the United States Navy or United States Marine Corps. United States Coast Guard crewed aircraft pilots are officially designated as "Coast Guard aviators", although they complete the same undergraduate flight training as Navy and Marine Corps crewed aircraft pilots, and are awarded the same aviation breast insignia.

== Naming conventions ==
In the U.S. Navy, most naval aviators are unrestricted line officers (URLs), eligible for command at sea, but a small number of former senior enlisted personnel subsequently commissioned as line limited duty officers and chief warrant officers in the aviation operations technician specialty have also been trained as naval aviators and naval flight officers.

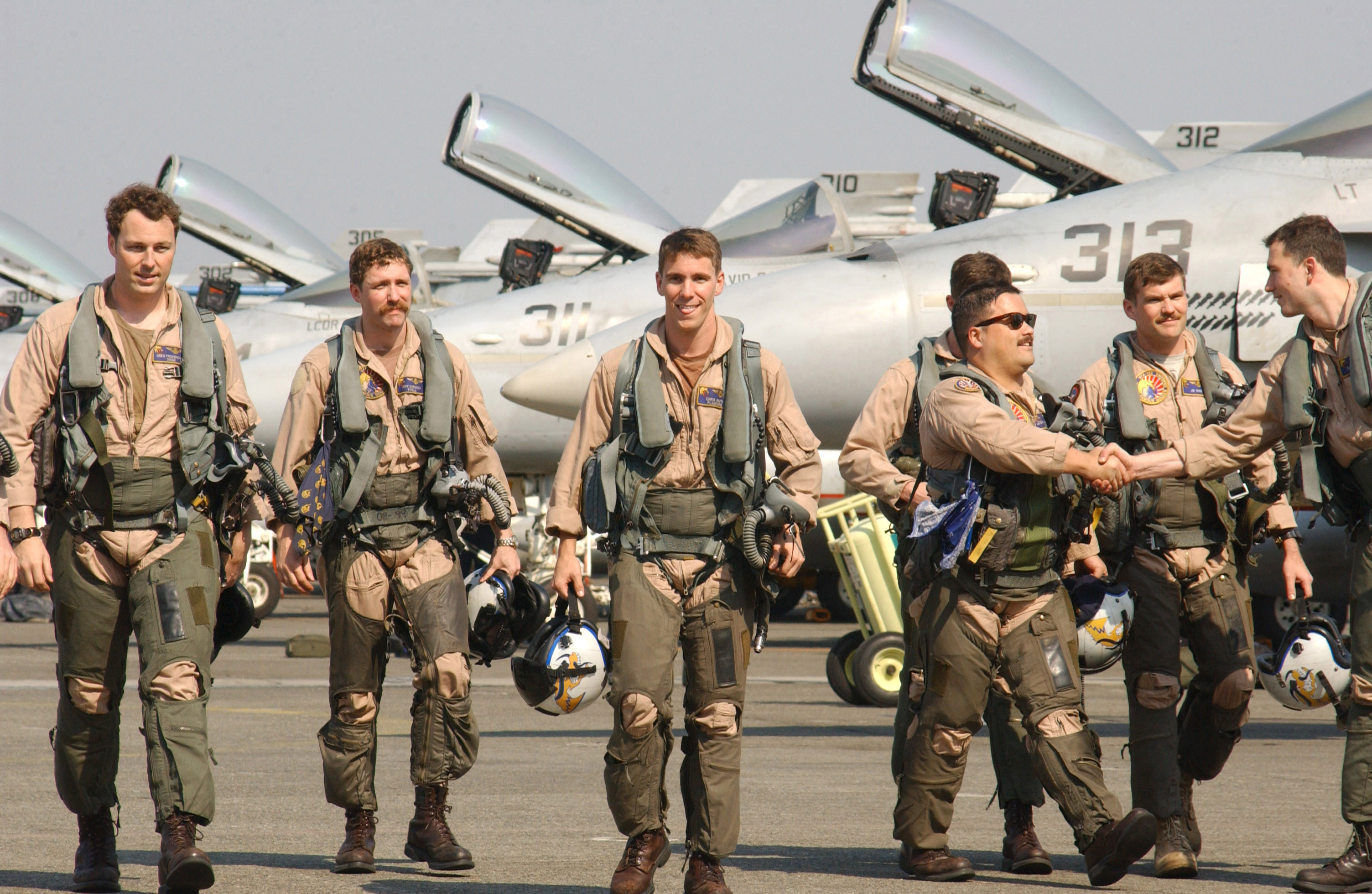
Pilots assigned to the "Golden Dragons" of VFA-192

A small number of URL officers trained as naval aviators and naval flight officers who hold technical degrees at the undergraduate and/or postgraduate level may also opt to laterally transfer to the restricted-line (RL) as aerospace engineering duty officers (AEDOs). AEDOs are frequently test pilot school graduates and retain their flying status, with most of their billets being in the Naval Air Systems Command (NAVAIRSYSCOM).

An even smaller number of naval aviators are in the U.S. Navy Medical Corps, primarily as naval flight surgeons. These are either former URL officers previously designated as naval aviators who later attended medical school and transferred to the medical corps, or an even smaller percentage of "dual designator" naval flight surgeons who are selected to be student naval aviators (SNAs) and underwent pilot training as medical corps officers. The vast majority of naval flight surgeons, although they are on flight status, are not dual designated and are not naval aviators.

All U.S. Marine Corps officers are line officers, either unrestricted line, limited duty, or warrant officers, eligible to command MAGTF units commensurate with their grade, designation, and occupational specialty; the U.S. Marine Corps does not have restricted line officers or staff corps officers, as does the U.S. Navy. All current USMC naval aviators and naval flight officers are unrestricted line officers, analogous to the Navy's URLs.

The U.S. Coast Guard categorizes all of its officers generally, with its Coast Guard aviators also being considered "operational" officers in the same manner as its cutterman officers in the Coast Guard's surface cutter fleet.

=== Naval aviation pilot (NAP) ===
Until 1981, the U.S. Navy and U.S. Marine Corps also had a small number of senior enlisted personnel trained as pilots. The last U.S. Coast Guard aviation pilot retired in 1979. Such individuals were referred to as "naval aviation pilots", colloquially "NAPs" or "APs". The since retired NAPs also continue to have a professional organization known as the "Silver Eagles", which remains informally aligned with other naval aviation professional organizations such as the Association of Naval Aviation, the Tailhook Association, the Maritime Patrol Association, and the Naval Helicopter Association (the pilot wings worn by NAPs were identical in design to the naval aviator insignia worn by commissioned officers. The silver eagle title was a reflection that the rating badge on their uniform had a silver eagle).

=== Naval aviation cadet (NAVCAD) ===
The U.S. Navy still has an unknown number of senior officers on active duty in the regular navy or serving in the navy reserve who were originally accessed as naval aviation cadets (NAVCADs). These individuals entered service via the NAVCAD program during the mid-to-late 1980s and early 1990s when the program was reinstated following a hiatus of over 20 years. NAVCADs were non-commissioned cadets who were required to have a minimum of 60 college credit hours to enter flight training (rather than the bachelor's degree normally required for entry into the flight training program) and were accessed only through the now-defunct Aviation Officer Candidate School (AOCS) program. Upon completion of AOCS, NAVCADS would enter into flight training and upon successful completion of training and designation as a naval aviator would be commissioned as officers with a reserve commission in an active-duty status. After completion of their initial operational flying tours, they would receive an assignment to complete their bachelor's degree. NAVCADs who failed to successfully complete flight training were contractually obligated to enter fleet service as undesignated enlisted personnel.

The last civilian applicants were accepted into the NAVCAD program in 1992, and the program was finally cancelled on October 1, 1993.

== Prerequisites ==
Except for an extremely small number of enlisted personnel selected to attend flight school subsequent to completing the STA-21, OCS, USMMA, USNA, or USCGA programs, all student naval aviators (SNAs) must first obtain an officer commission. To become a naval aviator, non-prior service personnel must be between the ages of 19 and 32 when entering flight training. Adjustments (waivers) can be made up to 24 months for those with prior service, and up to 48 months for those already in the military at the time of application or for Marine Corps platoon leader's course applicants with prior enlisted service.

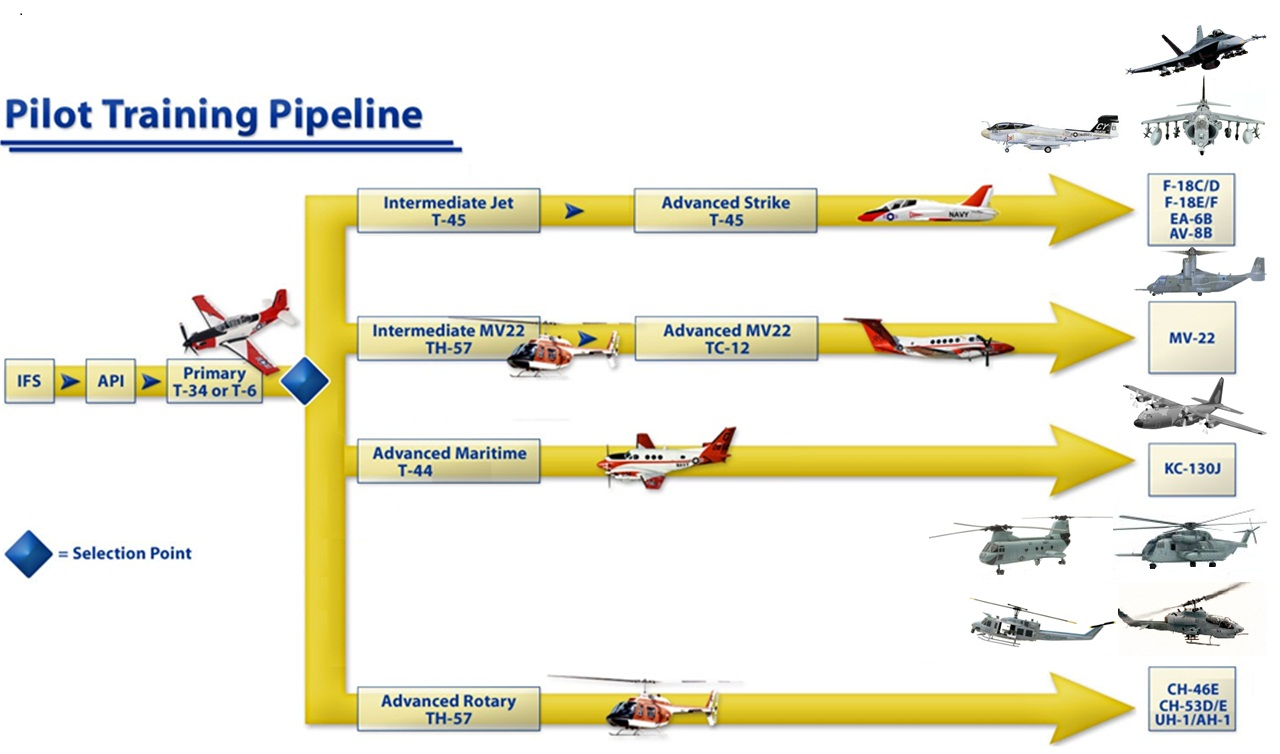
Marine Corps Aviation Pipeline

Navy and Marine Corps officers are currently commissioned through five sources - the United States Naval Academy at Annapolis, Maryland; the United States Merchant Marine Academy at Kings Point, New York; Naval Reserve Officer Training Corps (NROTC) at a number of colleges and universities across the country; Navy Officer Candidate School at Naval Station Newport, Rhode Island; Marine Corps Officer Candidates School (to include the Platoon Leaders Class [PLC] program) at Marine Corps Base Quantico, Virginia. A smaller number were previously commissioned via the Navy's limited duty officer or chief warrant officer programs, but this track has since been discontinued.

Coast Guard officers receive their commissions either from the United States Coast Guard Academy or Coast Guard Officer Candidate School, both located in New London, Connecticut; or via the United States Merchant Marine Academy in Kings Point, NY.

Graduates of these programs are commissioned as ensigns in the U.S. Navy or U.S. Coast Guard, or as second lieutenants in the Marine Corps. All individuals must pass an aeronautical screening, to include successful completion of the USN/USMC/USCG Aviation Selection Test Battery and be selected for pilot training prior to being designated as student naval aviators.

Student naval aviators progress through a significant training syllabus—typically 18 to 24 months for initial winging (designation) as naval aviators via either the advanced strike pipeline for those destined for fixed-wing aircraft such as fighter/bomber jets; the maritime pipeline for those en route to multi-engine, land and sea-based aircraft (with a slightly modified pipeline for prospective E-2 Advanced Hawkeye or C-2A Greyhound pilots); and the rotary wing pipeline for those who will fly helicopters or tilt rotor aircraft (with a slightly modified pipeline for MV-22 Osprey pilots). The longest of these "pipelines" is the E-2 or C-2A pipeline, averaging over three years from initial pre-flight training to designation as a naval aviator. All pipelines include ground and flight training at numerous locations.

Following designation as a naval aviator, all newly designated aviators report to a designated Navy or Marine Corps fleet replacement squadron (FRS), the Coast Guard Aviation Training Center at Mobile, Alabama.

=== Introductory flight screening (IFS) ===
IFS is the first step to becoming a naval aviator. After passing a medical screening, all new flight school students are enrolled in one of five civilian flight schools near NAS Pensacola. For those students requiring IFS, they will complete 2 weeks of ground training and around 14 hours of flight training in single-engined general aviation aircraft. Coast Guard students complete 25 hours of flight training. A student must solo and pass the FAA private pilot knowledge test. IFS screens a student's flight aptitude prior to beginning the Navy training syllabus and is waived for students reporting to NAS Pensacola with a private pilot's certificate or better, or those United States Naval Academy midshipmen who have completed the powered flight program.

=== Aviation preflight indoctrination (API) ===
Notable dramatization of API/AOCS, in media: An Officer and a Gentleman

All SNAs start at the "Cradle of Naval Aviation", NAS Pensacola, Florida. API classes consist of Navy, Marine Corps, and Coast Guard SNAs, student naval flight officers, flight surgeons, and foreign exchange military pilots. Students receive four weeks of classroom instruction in aerodynamics, aircraft engines and systems, meteorology, air navigation, and flight rules and regulations. Following academics, students spend two weeks learning land survival, first aid, physiology, and water survival and egress. Following the end of academic instruction, API students hold a social event known as Flight Suit Friday at the Mustin Beach officers club. From that point onward, the students are authorized the wear of flight suits (with service-specific garrison cap) as their daily uniform instead of Navy service khakis, Marine service Charlies or Coast Guard tropical blue.

Prior to its disestablishment, Aviation Officer Candidate School (AOCS) at NAS Pensacola incorporated the entire API syllabus into the nominally 15-week AOCS curriculum. AOCS students were commissioned only after they completed API requirements.

=== Naval Introductory Flight Evaluation (NIFE) ===
In November 2020, The Chief of Naval Air Training (CNATRA) combined IFS and API into a singular program. As of today, NIFE is the new first step to becoming a naval aviator. All prospective SNAs begin the course with the API academic instruction, involving aerodynamics, flight rules and regulations, meteorology, navigation, and aircraft engines and systems. Following successful completion of the academic portion and Flight Suit Friday, SNAs will begin the IFS portion of the course, conducted with civilian flight schools at either Pensacola Regional Airport or Jack Edwards Airport in Orange Beach, Alabama. Students will complete approximately 10 hours of basic flying and will mimic the expectations needed to succeed in primary flight training. Upon completion of a check ride by a CFI, students will spend a week learning physiology and water survival and egress before graduating and heading to primary flight training.

=== Primary flight training ===
Following NIFE graduation, SNAs are assigned to Training Air Wing Five at NAS Whiting Field, Florida or Training Air Wing Four at NAS Corpus Christi, Texas, where they learn to fly the Beechcraft T-6B Texan II (JPATS). Primary teaches the basics of flying in approximately six months and is divided into the following stages:

- Ground school (aircraft systems, local course rules, emergency procedures)
- Contact (takeoff and landing, limited maneuvers, spins, emergency landing pattern (ELP), emergency procedures)
- Basic instruments (common instrument scans, generic instrument flight procedures)
- Precision aerobatics (aileron roll, loop, Cuban eight, barrel roll, wingover, split S, Immelmann, cloverleaf)
- Formation (basic section flight, cruise formation flight)
- Radio instrument navigation (VOR, holding, ILS/LOC, PAR/ASR, RNAV)
- Night familiarization
- Visual navigation

=== Advanced flight training ===
Upon successful completion of primary flight training, SNAs are selected for one of five advanced flight training paths: Strike, E-2/C-2 (Navy only), multi-engine, rotary, or tilt-rotor. Selection is based on the needs of the military service, an SNA's performance, and an SNA's preference. Previously, students were given the option to select tailhook and trained in the T-45C before learning if they would continue in either strike or E-2/C-2.

- SNAs selected for the strike pipeline complete centrifuge training before reporting to NAS Kingsville, Texas or NAS Meridian, Mississippi. Intermediate and advanced strike training is conducted in the T-45C Goshawk at VT-7 or VT-9 at Training Air Wing One, NAS Meridian, MS, or VT-21 or VT-22 at Training Air Wing TWO, Kingsville, TX. This syllabus is the foundation upon which all future tailhook aviators begin to build their experience. The strike pipeline fills fleet seats for the F/A-18C/D Hornet (USMC) and F/A-18E/F Super Hornet (USN), EA-18G Growler (USN), F-35B Lightning II (USMC), and the F-35C Lightning II (USN and USMC).
- SNAs selected for the E-2/C-2 pipeline (USN only) at the completion of primary flight training report to Training Air Wing FOUR in Corpus Christi, Texas, for multi-engine training in the T-44C. Upon completion, students will report to Trawing One or Trawing Two to complete a syllabus that culminates in T-45C carrier qualification prior to reporting to VAW-120 at NS Norfolk, Virginia.
- SNAs selected for multi-engine training are assigned to NAS Corpus Christi, Texas, for training in the T-44C Pegasus. These SNAs move on to NAS Jacksonville to train on the Boeing P-8 Poseidon, MCAS Cherry Point or MCAS Miramar to train on the Lockheed KC-130, or to their destined stations for Coast Guard SNAs. Previously, Navy SNAs assigned to the E-6B Mercury were sent to Vance AFB, Oklahoma, for training in the T-1 Jayhawk.
- Those selected for helicopter training are assigned to NAS Whiting Field, Florida, for training in the TH-57B/C or the TH-73A Thrasher.
- SNAs selected to fly the MV-22 Osprey and the CMV-22 Osprey after primary flight training are assigned first to NAS Whiting Field in Pensacola, Florida for abbreviated advanced helicopter training and then to NAS Corpus Christi for multi-engine training in the T-44C Pegasus. With exposure to both helicopter and multi-engine flying, the SNA has a diverse background to transition to tilt-rotor aircraft. Upon successful completion of flight training and designation as a Naval Aviator (NA) (earning the Wings of Gold), NAs will head to either VMMT-204 at MCAS New River or VRM-50 at NAS North Island to learn how to fly the Osprey.

==== Strike syllabus ====
Student naval aviators selected for strike training are assigned to NAS Kingsville, Texas or NAS Meridian, Mississippi, flying the T-45C. The intermediate syllabus incorporates basic instrument flying, formation, night familiarization, and airway navigation over approximately 58 graded flights lasting approximately 27 weeks.

Advanced strike students continue with approximately 67 additional graded flights lasting approximately 23 weeks in the T-45 Goshawk. The syllabus covers bombing, air combat maneuvering (ACM), advanced instruments, low-level navigation, tactical formation flying (TACFORM), and carrier qualification (CQ) (see Modern US Navy carrier operations). Graduates of advanced strike fly the F/A-18C/D Hornet (USMC), F/A-18E/F Super Hornet (USN), EA-18G Growler (USN), F-35B Lightning II (USMC), and the F-35C Lightning II (USN and USMC).

Advanced strike training previously produced pilots for the now-retired F-8 Crusader (to include RF-8 variants), F-4 Phantom II (to include RF-4 variants), F-14 Tomcat, A-3 Skywarrior, A-4 Skyhawk, A-6 Intruder, EA-6B Prowler, A-7 Corsair II, RA-5C Vigilante, and S-3 Viking.

==== E-2/C-2 pipeline ====
E-2/C-2 students go to NAS Corpus Christi to complete multi-crew and multi-engine training (approx. 16 weeks) in the T-44A with VT-31, followed by CQ in the T-45 Goshawk. Following winging, they proceed to the E-2/C-2 Fleet Replacement Squadron VAW-120, NS Norfolk for aircraft qualification before assignment to a carrier air wing (CVW) VAW (E-2C Hawkeye) or VRC (C-2A Greyhound) squadron. The VAW squadrons are home-ported at either NS Norfolk, Virginia, NAS Point Mugu, California, or NAF Atsugi, Japan, and deploy as a squadron of four aircraft aboard their respective aircraft carrier. The VRC squadrons are based at either NS Norfolk, or NAS North Island, and deploy in detachments of two aircraft aboard their respective aircraft carrier.

==== Rotary-wing pipeline ====
SNAs selected for helicopter training report to NAS Whiting Field, Florida, and complete advanced training in the TH-57 Sea Ranger or the TH-73A Thrasher. Students receive over 100 hours of instruction learning the unique characteristics and tactics of rotary-wing aviation. Students progress through several phases of training including basic helicopter familiarization, tactics, basic and radio instruments, visual, instrument, and low-level navigation, formation, night familiarization (including use of night vision goggles), and search and rescue. Upon completion, students will receive their wings of gold and are designated naval aviators. Previously flight training for rotary wing aircraft was divided into two stages, primary and advanced. Primary helicopter flight training was conducted at HT-8 using the TH-57A. Advanced helicopter flight training was conducted by HT-18 using several variants of the UH-1. During the 1980s the UH-1 was replaced by the TH-57B and TH-57C.

Once they receive their wings of gold, Navy helicopter pilots report to their respective fleet replacement squadron (FRS) for training: HSM-41 for the MH-60R Seahawk or HSC-3 for the MH-60S Knighthawk (HSC) at NAS North Island; HSM-40 for the MH-60R Seahawk at NS Mayport; HSC-2 for the MH-60S Knighthawk or HM-12 for the MH-53E Sea Dragon at Norfolk, or VRM-50 at NAS North Island for the CMV-22 Osprey.

Marine Corps helicopter/tiltrotor pilots report to HMHT-302 at MCAS New River for the CH-53E/K Super/King Stallion; HMLAT-303 at MCAS Camp Pendleton for the AH-1Z Viper, UH-1Y Venom; or VMMT-204 at MCAS New River for the MV-22 Osprey.

Coast Guard helicopter pilots report to the Coast Guard Aviation Training Center in Mobile, Alabama for further training, or the "T-Course", on the MH-60T Jayhawk and MH-65D Dolphin.

The Navy also trains pilots from several NATO and other allied nations as military and naval helicopter pilots.

==== Multi-engine pipeline ====
Maritime multi-engine students complete their advanced training at NAS Corpus Christi, flying the twin-engine T-44A/C Pegasus. Particular emphasis is placed on single-engine flight in varying conditions and instrument flying. Upon receiving their wings of gold, Navy pilots report to VP-30, the P-8 Poseidon FRS, for further training in the P-8A.

Marine Corps pilots report to the Lockheed KC-130 FRD at either MCAS Cherry Point or MCAS Miramar. Previously VMGRT-253 served as the KC-130 FRS until its deactivation in 2006.

Coast Guard pilots destined for the HC-130 or HC-144 proceed directly to their assigned air station. As budget and time allow, the HC-130 pilots report to an Air Force C-130 formal training unit (FTU) at Little Rock Air Force Base, Arkansas or Dobbins Air Reserve Base, Georgia.

As of 2012, VT-31 and VT-35 no longer train United States Air Force student pilots bound for C-130 duty. Coast Guard HC-144 pilots report to the Coast Guard aviation training center (ATC) in Mobile, Alabama for a transition course after reporting to their assigned air station.

Similarly, Navy E-6 Mercury TACAMO pilots complete advanced training in the T-44C Pegasus at NAS Corpus Christi, TX. TACAMO-bound students no longer train on the T-1A Jayhawk, a militarized version of the Beechcraft 400, at the Air Force's 32nd Flying Training Squadron at Vance Air Force Base, Oklahoma as of 2012.

Training Air Wing FOUR has converted analog T-44As to digital T-44Cs which is the perfect lead-in trainer for the digital / glass cockpit of the P-8A Poseidon, MV-22 Osprey, E6-B Mercury, and C-130J Hercules aircraft. High fidelity T-44C visual simulators will follow the upgrade which will enable the perfect mix of ground and air training.

== Insignia and winging ==
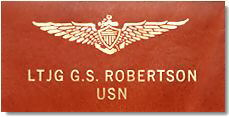
Leather naval aviator "soft patch" worn on flight suits and flight jackets.

The Naval Aviator Insignia (sometimes referred to as "naval aviator wings") is a warfare qualification of the United States military that is awarded to personnel of the United States Navy, Marine Corps, and Coast Guard who have qualified as naval aviators. The Naval Aviator Insignia is identical for all three branches, as are the similar naval astronaut and naval flight officer badges. Naval aviation pilots were awarded the naval aviation pilot badge which, while considered a separate award, was identical in design to the naval aviator badge. The badge was designed by John H. Towers c. 1917 and consists of a single fouled anchor, surmounted by a shield with 13 stripes, centered on a pair of wings. Between January 1927 and October 1929, the design of naval aviation observer wings was the same as naval aviator wings, except the observer wings were silver. Observer wings after that were of a distinct design.

== Community selection ==
Upon completion of flight training, a final selection process takes place in which the student naval aviators are assigned a particular fleet aircraft community (e.g., F/A-18C/D/E/F, EA-18G, AV-8B or F-35B/C for strike; E-2/C-2 for carrier AEW and COD; SH-60, HH-60, MH-60, MH-65, AH-1Z, UH-1Y, CH-53E/K, MH-53, CMV-22, or MV-22 for rotary-wing, P-8, E-6, EP-3, KC-130, HC-130, HC-144 for maritime, etc.). This selection is also based upon the needs of the service and performance. Newly designated naval aviators (no longer referred to as "students") are then assigned to a USN or USMC fleet replacement squadron or other similar training organization under the cognizance of the US Coast Guard or the US Air Force, for training on their specific aircraft type. Currently, approximately up to 1,000 pilots are designated each year, and between 1910 and 1995 more than 153,000 naval aviators earned their "wings of gold".

== Service commitment ==
Student naval aviators incur an eight-year active duty service commitment that begins after they receive designation as a naval aviator.

== Aircraft carrier commanding officer ==
A provision in Title 10 of the United States Code requires that US aircraft carrier commanding officers and executive officers be Navy unrestricted line officers designated as either naval aviators or naval flight officers.

== Naval astronauts ==
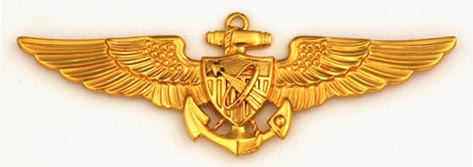
Naval Astronaut insignia

Naval aviators who fly in space are designated naval astronauts, and are issued the naval aviator version of the astronaut badge.

== See also ==
- Aviation Cadet Training Program (USN)
- United States Marine Corps Aviation
- Naval flight officer
- Modern United States Navy carrier air operations
- List of United States naval aircraft
- List of United States Navy aircraft squadrons
- List of United States Marine Corps aircraft squadrons
- NATOPS
- Badges of the United States Navy
- Badges of the United States Marine Corps
- Badges of the United States Coast Guard
- Military badges of the United States
