= HT-8 =

Helicopter Training Squadron 8
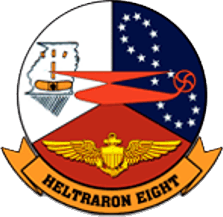
- HT-8 Insignia
- Active: 3 December 1950 - Present
- Country: United States of America
- Branch: United States Navy
- Role: Rotary Training
- Size: Approximately 225 (55 Instructor Pilots/170 Students)
- Part of: Training Air Wing Five
- Garrison/HQ: NAS Whiting Field
- Nickname: "Eightballers"
- Motto: "America's Squadron"
- Colors: Red, Blue, and White
- Mascot: 8-Ball

Commanders
- Commanding Officer: CDR Darin Stockman, USN
- Executive Officer: CDR David Burkett, USN

Helicopter Training Squadron EIGHT (HT-8) is a United States Navy helicopter training squadron based at Naval Air Station Whiting Field in Milton, FL. The squadron's mission is helicopter pilot training for U. S. Navy, U. S. Marine Corps and U. S. Coast Guard Student Naval Aviators and for selected foreign military flight students from basic helicopter flight training through winging. Student Naval Aviators report to HT-8 for helicopter training upon completion of primary flight training conducted in the T-6B Texan II U. S. Navy primary flight trainer. HT-8 flies the TH-73A Thrasher, an AgustaWestland AW119 Koala modified to navy specification. The unit generally uses the call sign "Eight Ball" over the radio.

== History ==
Helicopter Training Squadron EIGHT is the oldest currently active helicopter squadron in the U. S. Navy. In April 1948 the U. S. Navy established two helicopter squadrons and designated them Helicopter Utility Squadron ONE (HU-1) and Helicopter Utility Squadron TWO (HU-2). In 1950, the training element of HU-2 was moved from the squadron's location at Naval Air Station Lakehurst in New Jersey to Naval Air Station Ellyson Field near Pensacola Florida.

On 3 December 1950 that training element was formally established as Helicopter Training Unit ONE (HTU-1). HTU-1 employed a number of early helicopters training fixed wing aviators to fly helicopters. Among those helicopters were the Piasecki HUP Retriever, the Sikorsky HO3S-1 Horse and various versions of the Bell HTL Sioux helicopter. In 1957, the Navy changed the designation system it used to identify aircraft training units and in March 1957, HTU-1 was re-designated Helicopter Training Group ONE (HTG-1). HTG-1 continued to use the HUP and the HTL helicopters and added the HO4S-3 and HRS series Chickasaw Helicopters. In July 1960, the designation system was again changed and on 1 July 1960 HTG-1 was re-designated as the eighth training squadron of the then Naval Air Basic Training Command bearing the designation; Helicopter Training Squadron EIGHT (HT-8).

By 1962 HT-8 was using the HSS-1 Seabat along with the Chickasaws and Sioux helicopters. In September 1962 the Navy adopted the 1962 United States Tri-Service aircraft designation system and the HO4S and HRS Chickasaw became the CH-19E Chickasaw, the HTL Sioux became the TH-13M Sioux and the HSS-1 Seabat became the SH-34G Seabat. Also in 1962 HT-8 simultaneously designated its first student as a Naval Aviator and a Helicopter Pilot. Prior to that all training had been transitioning fixed wing aviators to fly helicopters. Helicopters used in the decade from 1962 to 1972 were the UH-34J Seahorse, a number of UH-1D Iroquois borrowed from the U. S. Army and beginning in 1968 a new helicopter designated the TH-57A Sea Ranger which was a variant of the popular commercial Bell 206 Jet Ranger. By the end of 1969 the Army's UH-1Ds were being replaced by Navy procured TH-1L Iroquois. By the early 70s the Seahorse was gone and HT-8 had reduced down to the TH-57A for basic training and the TH-1L for advanced training.

In March 1974 HT-8 moved from Ellyson Field to its present location aboard Naval Air Station Whiting Field. Coincident with that move a new Helicopter Training Squadron was established and designated HT-18. HT-8 assumed responsibility for the basic training phase of helicopter flight instruction using the TH-57A Sea Ranger and HT-18 assumed the role of advanced helicopter training utilizing the TH-1L Iroquois.

In the early 80s HT-18's TH-1Ls were being replaced with an instrumented version of the TH-57 designated the TH-57C Sea Ranger for advanced training. In October 1985 HT-8 and HT-18 became "mirror" squadrons with each teaching the full syllabus from basic helicopter training through advanced training and awarding of wings with both squadrons using both the TH-57A and TH-57C Sea Rangers. By the end of the 80s the TH-57As were replaced with a Bell 206B-3 designated the TH-57B Sea Ranger. Since that time HT-8 has been training and winging Naval Aviators using the TH-57B for primary helicopter training and the TH-57C for advanced helicopter training.

== Insignia ==
The three basic colors of HT-8's patch - red, white and blue - represent the colors of the U.S. flag, and are indicative of HT-8's nickname, "America's Squadron", created in the 1980s. The three colors also commemorate the universality of our squadron's students, instructors and staff hailing from all parts of the United States. The overall field is sectored into three equal portions to symbolize training for the three sea services of the US Navy, the US Marine Corps and the US Coast Guard.

A helicopter profile at the patch's center symbolizes advanced rotary training, and is orange to reflect the traditional color of orange on all Navy training aircraft. There are three versions of the tail rotor on the right side of the helicopter profile. The original version is a simple cross to indicate the blades of a tail rotor. Common lore is that a squadron commanding officer changed the tail rotor design during the Vietnam War to a peace sign, as a silent protest to the war. Then in the 1990s, another commanding officer devised yet a third design, a script-like 'S', this time reflecting the Sikorsky aircraft "S," probably reflecting his preference for Sikorsky aircraft - despite the fact that the squadron had by then transitioned to the TH-57 Sea Ranger, a Bell company product. All three versions of the patch are worn by squadron pilots to this day.

The cloud shape (some say it resembles the state of Georgia, backwards) and storm in the upper left quadrant are superimposed by helicopter turn needle and ball instruments, and indicate that students at HT-8 are trained in instrument flight. The orange helicopter profile is facing as if it is flying into the cloud, signifying the confidence HT-8's students have in their ability to fly in all weather conditions.

The 18 stars in the upper right quadrant - in the shape of an '8' - reflect the fact that advanced rotary flight students originally began their training at HT-8, completing only familiarization training (now known as 'contact' training) in this squadron. Following their fam solo at HT-8 the students would then transfer to HT-18 to complete the rest of their training (therefore HT-18 was "in the stars" for HT-8 students). In 1986 both HT-8 and HT-18 became "mirror image" squadrons, training students from contact flying through advanced tactics.

The gold wings in the lower quadrant symbolize the goal of all students who enter advanced rotary wing training at HT-8 - designation as an "unrestricted" naval aviator.

== See also ==
- History of the United States Navy
- List of United States Navy aircraft squadrons
