= Landing area =

Area or surface designated for aircraft operations

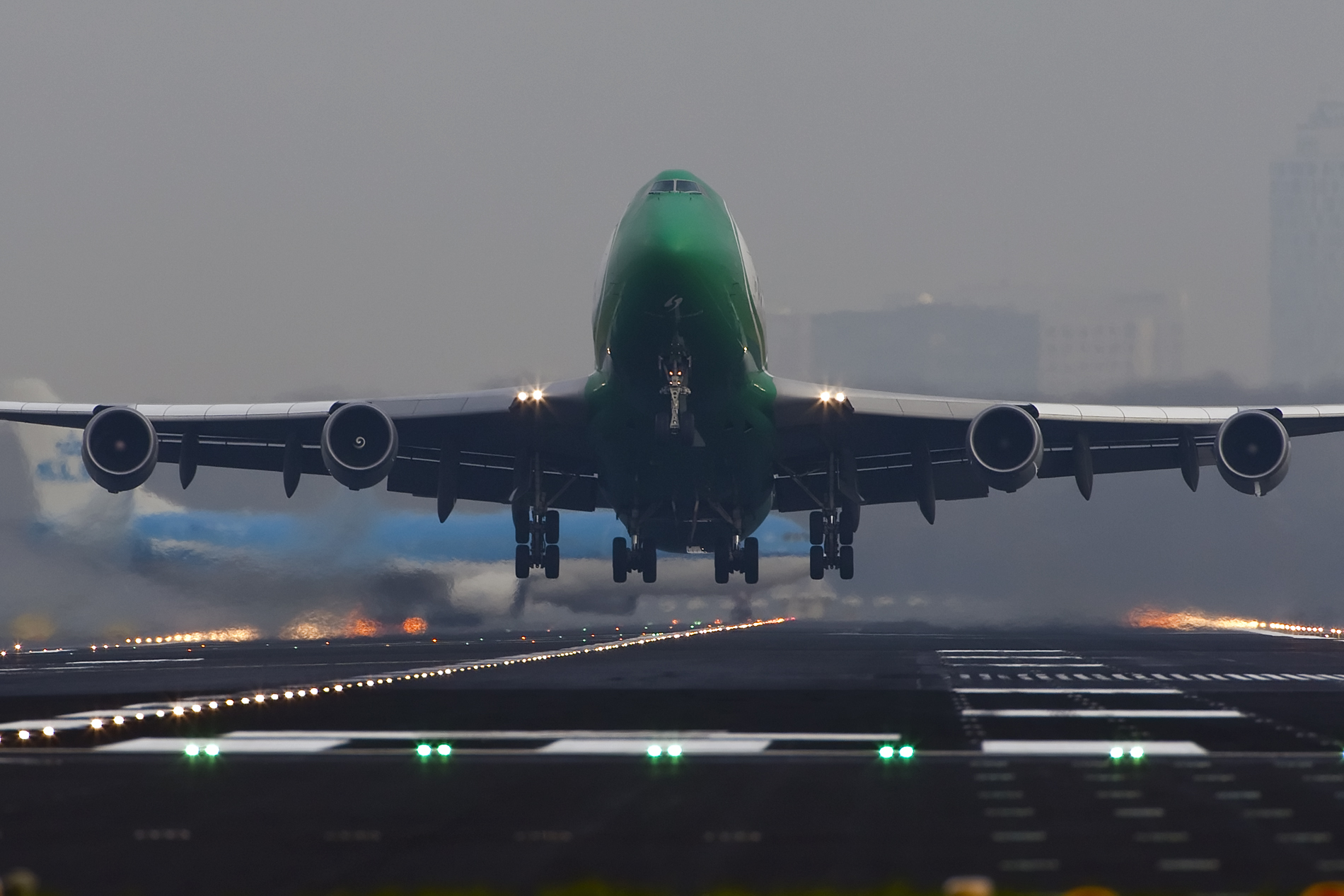
Cargo plane taking off from a runway

Landing area is an official designation of specialized Earth surface region by the international standard publication describing airfields and airports to aviators, the Aeronautical Information Publication. As such, it is directly translated into dozens of languages, wherever an AIP publication exists, which is one for every aviation-regulating country of the world. It is the most salient description of the logistics real estate which enable planes or helicopters or other aircraft to come and go. It also has other meanings, which extend beyond aviation concepts and airport terminology, all of them military in kind.

A landing area may be:

1. Any wrought, treated or merely selected surface of land, water, or a ship vessel's deck employed in a sustained way for either takeoff or landing of aircraft.
2. Operational area segment of an amphibious military unit. This may comprise the beach, the over-water or over-land approaches to the said beach, as well as adjacent transport areas, airspace, or so-called fire support zones, including airspace and terrain subjected to the presence or actions of close-support aircraft. Usually this concept extends to any land included in any consequent military advance made.
3. (Airborne forces) The area where landing troops are to be deployed, or supplies, either through air landing or air drop, including drop zones, landing strips, adjacent airspace or body of water.

== See also ==
- Airport
- Airfield
- Altiport
- Wayport
- STOLport
- Joint-use airport
- Highway strip
- Satellite airfield
- Operational area
- Beachhead/Landing operation
- Airspace/Airhead
- Amphibious force
- Airdrop
- Drop zone/Landing zone
