= Carrier-based aircraft =

Military aircraft designed specifically for operations from aircraft carriers

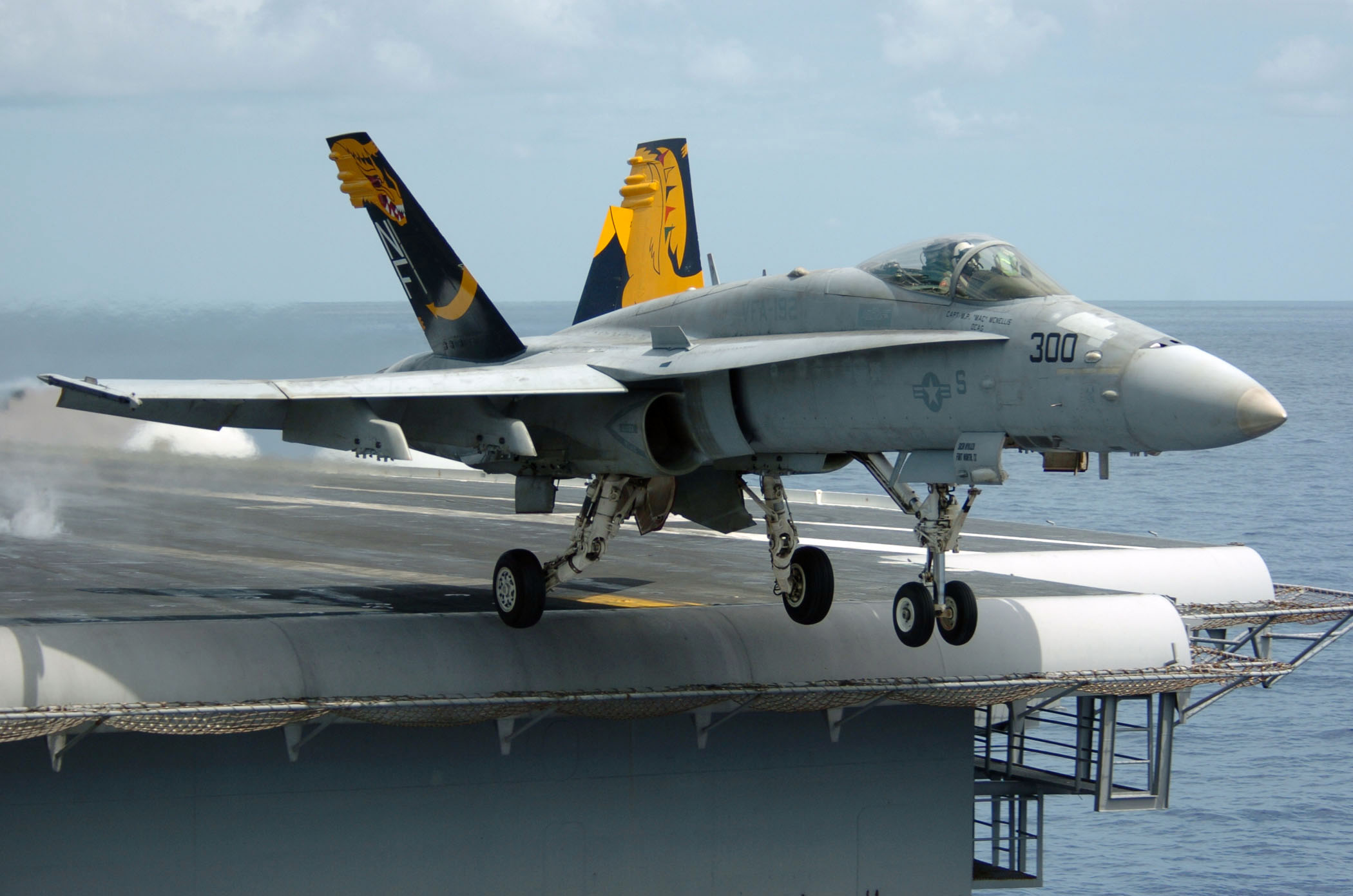
An F/A-18C Hornet launches from the flight deck of the aircraft carrier USS Kitty Hawk

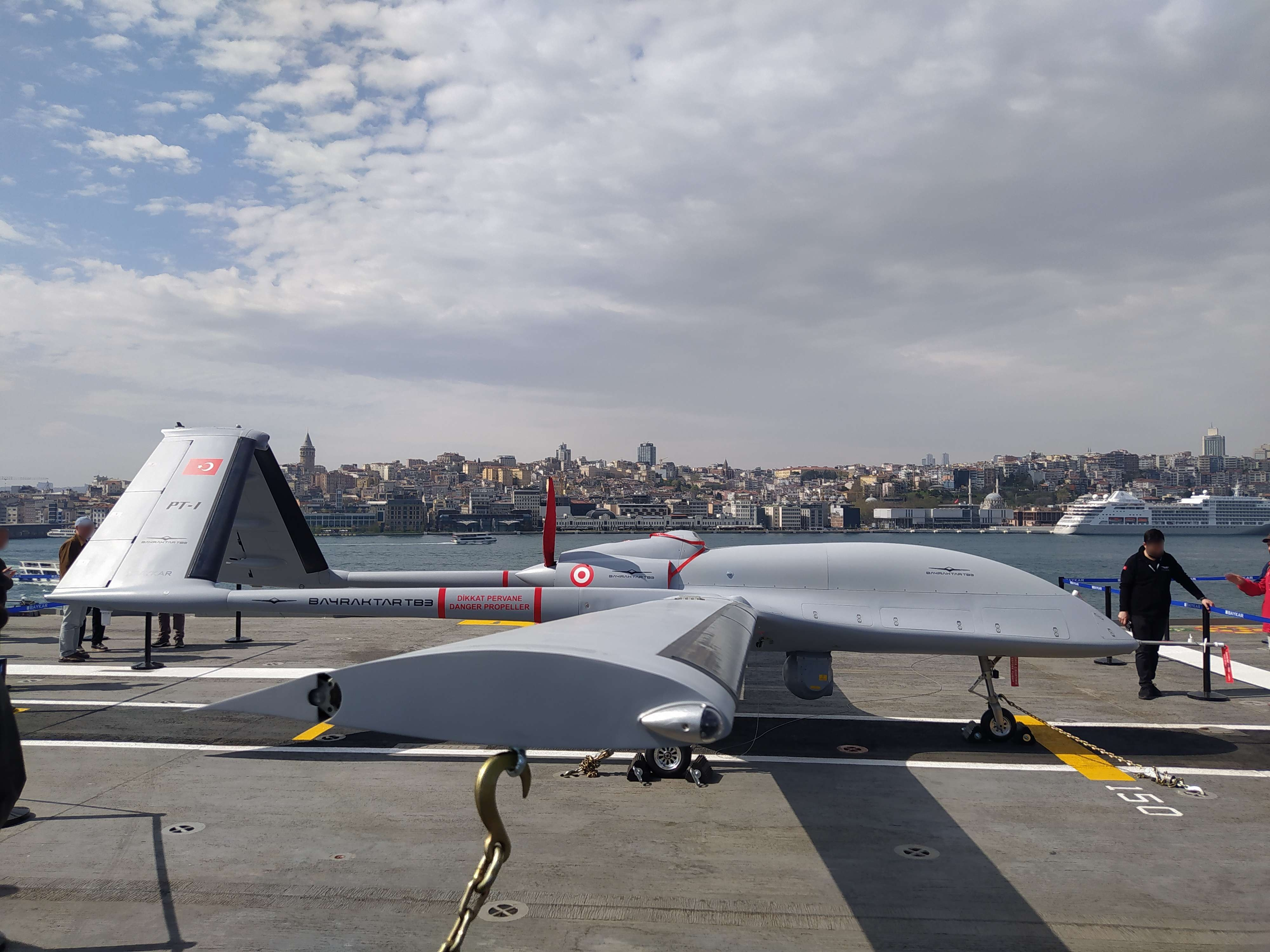
The Baykar Bayraktar TB3 is the world's first operational full-size, carrier-based UAV capable of taking off from and landing on the short-flight deck of the TCG Anadolu, the world's first military drone carrier

A carrier-based aircraft (also known as carrier-capable aircraft, carrier-borne aircraft, carrier aircraft or aeronaval aircraft) is a navalised aircraft designed for seaborne flight operations from aircraft carriers. The term is generally applied only to shipborne fixed-wing aircraft that require a runway of some sort for takeoff and landing, as VTOL aircraft such as helicopters are inherently capable of adapting to flight operations from a wide variety of ships (not just aircraft carriers) as long as the served vessel is equipped with helipads or a sufficiently spacious deck that can provide a reliable landing area, which include helicopter carriers, amphibious assault ships, aviation-capable surface combatants (cruisers, destroyers, frigates and some corvettes), container ships and even cruiseliners.

Carrier-based aircraft are designed for many purposes including aerial combat, surface attack, anti-submarine warfare (ASW), search and rescue (SAR), carrier onboard delivery (COD), weather observation, reconnaissance and airborne early warning and control (AEW&C). Such aircraft must be able to take off from the short distance and must be available on the carrier's flight deck and be sturdy enough to withstand the abrupt forces exerted by on a pitching deck due to sea waves. Some modern carrier aircraft are designed for catapult-assisted takeoffs and thus also need to be constructed more robust airframes and landing gears that can handle sudden forward accelerations. Arrestor hook is mandatory feature for those designed for CATOBAR or STOBAR landing, while thrust vectoring or tiltrotor nacelles are commonly seen in those capable of V/STOL operations. In addition, their wings are generally larger (thus can generate more lift) than the land-launched counterparts, and are typically able to fold up or swing back for taxiing, pushback and parking in tight quarters.

Carrier-based combat aircraft constitute the core offensive capability of a carrier battle group, allowing the fleet to project firepower far beyond the radius of action of conventional naval guns, rocket artillery and guided missiles. The ability to operate aircraft directly from a carrier is also a testament of modern blue-water navy, as the capacity to achieve air supremacy and air interdiction from anywhere at sea has been a hallmark of naval combined arms and command of the sea since aircraft carriers reigned supreme as capital ships during the Second World War.

== History ==
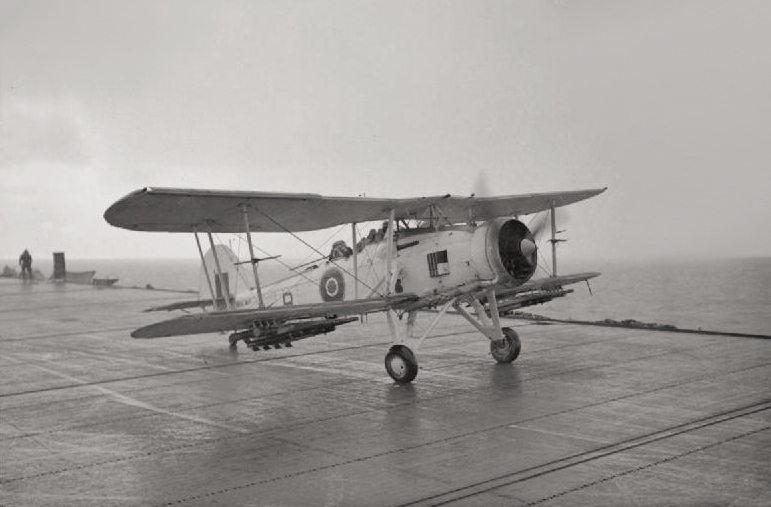
A Royal Navy Fairey Swordfish taking-off from HMS Tracker, 1943

The 1903 advent of fixed-wing aircraft was followed in 1910 by the first flight of an aircraft from the deck of an anchored warship (the United States Navy's USS Birmingham), and in 1912, by the first flight of an aircraft from the deck of a warship underway (the Royal Navy's HMS Hibernia). Seaplanes and seaplane tender support ships, such as HMS Engadine, followed. This evolution was well underway by the early 1920s, resulting in ships such as HMS Argus (1918), Hōshō (1922), USS Langley (1922), and Béarn (1927). With these developments, the need for specialized aircraft adapted for take-offs and landings from the flight decks of those ships became recognized.

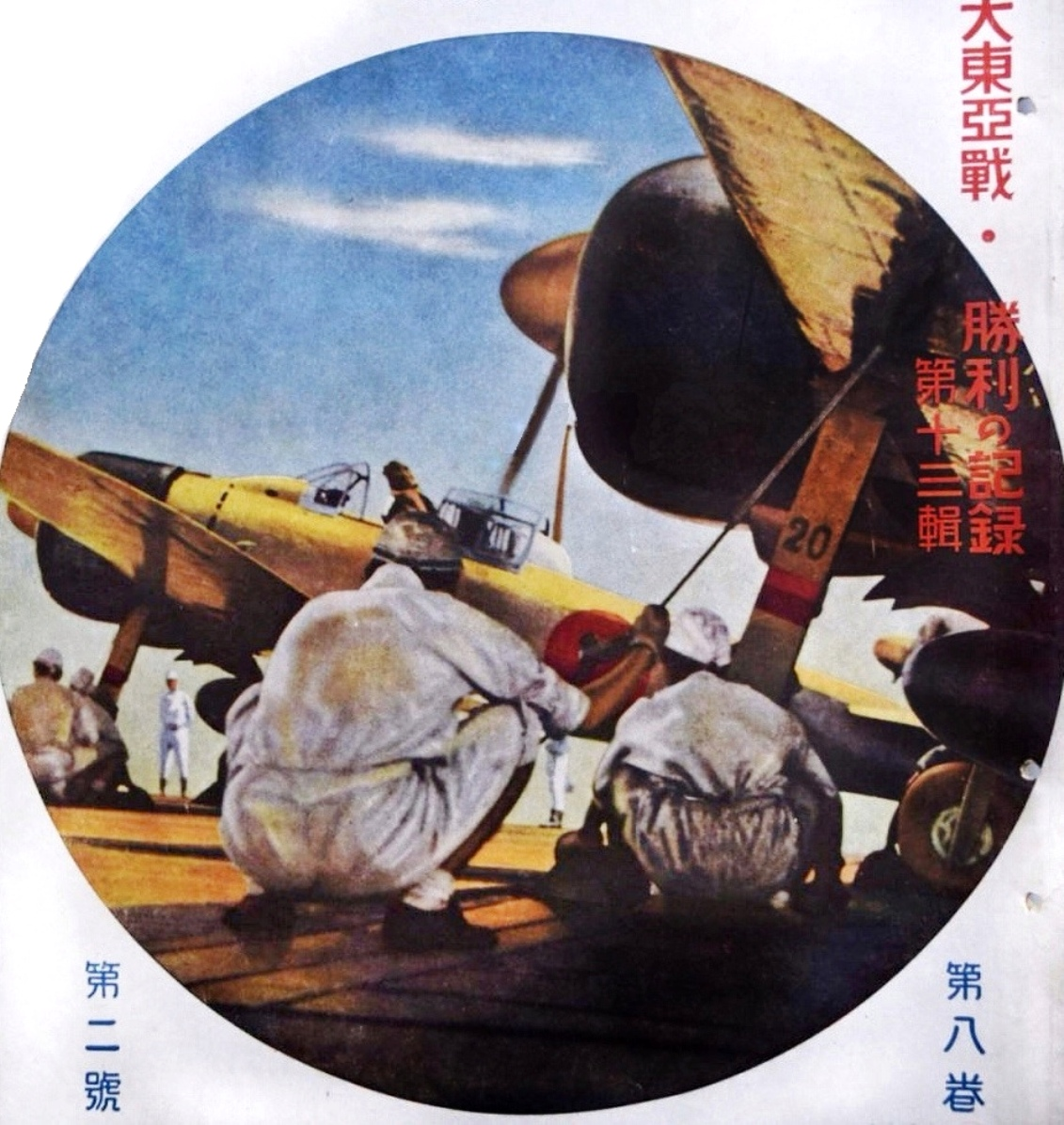
Illustration of Mitsubishi A6M Zeros on Kaga aircraft carrier, 1942

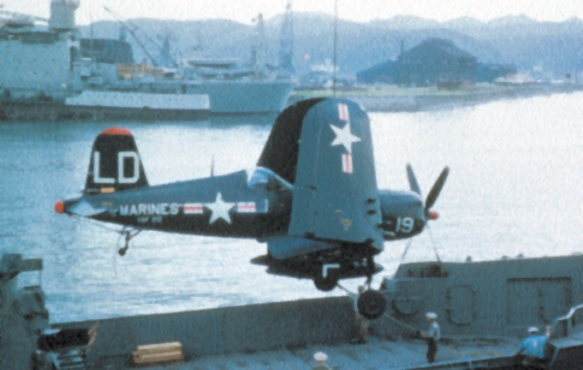
A F4U-5 Corsair is hoisted on deck of a vessel at Yokosuka, Japan, 1950.

The significance of air power grew between the wars, driven by the increased range, carrying power, and effectiveness of carrier-launched aircraft, until it became impossible to disregard its importance during World War II, following the loss of many warships to aircraft, including the sinking of Prince of Wales and Repulse, the Battle of Taranto, the Attack on Pearl Harbor and numerous other incidents. Following the war, carrier operations continued to increase in size and importance.

The vital importance of aircraft carriers, and therefore carrier-capable aircraft, quickly became apparent at the onset of the war in the Pacific where the US's island hopping campaign meant that being able to conduct air operations at sea far from an airbase was crucially important. At the onset Japan used 125 Mitsubishi A6M Zeros launched from 6 aircraft carriers to attack the Naval base at Pearl Harbor, with the result of sinking or damaging 21 warships, and destroying 188 aircraft. The war saw the creation of new carrier capable aircraft such as the Vought F4U Corsair, and further variants of the Zero. Often carrier aircraft would have folding wings or wingtips to maximise space conservation on the decks of carriers.

Carrier aircraft were used extensively during the Korean and Vietnam wars. Douglas A-4 Skyhawks participated in the first strikes of the Vietnam War in response to attacks against American destroyers in the Tonkin Gulf in August 1964. The A-4's small size and light weight meant a high number could be loaded onto carriers, making them an important resource during the Vietnam war.

On 19 November 2024, Baykar Bayraktar TB3 UAV successfully landed and took-off from the world's first military drone carrier TCG Anadolu. It was the first time a fixed-wing unmanned aircraft of this size and class had successfully landed on a short-runway of a carrier ship. On 18 February 2026, the Bayraktar TB3 successfully performed a flight demonstration from the TCG Anadolu in the Baltic region during NATO's Steadfast Dart 2026 exercise. The drone operated effectively in strong winds, freezing temperatures and heavy snowfall. The drone also successfully hit surface targets at sea with two MAM-L precision-guided munitions. After this, the Bayraktar TB3 also completed an eight-hour joint sortie with multiple Eurofighter Typhoon fighters of the German Air Force in Baltic Sea during the exercise. During this exercise with the Eurofighter Typhoons, the Bayraktar TB-3 was covered 1,700 kilometers on its mission. The drone also captured aerial video of the Eurofighter Typhoon using its ASELFLIR 500 electro-optical reconnaissance, surveillance and targeting system made by the Turkish company Aselsan. This mission marked a significant integration of unmanned aerial vehicles with advanced fighter jets in a multinational drill with performing manned-unmanned teaming. The operation demonstrated the drone carrier TCG Anadolu's capability to operate effectively within high-intensity long-range alliance maneuvers.

== Types ==
=== Conventional take-off and landing ===
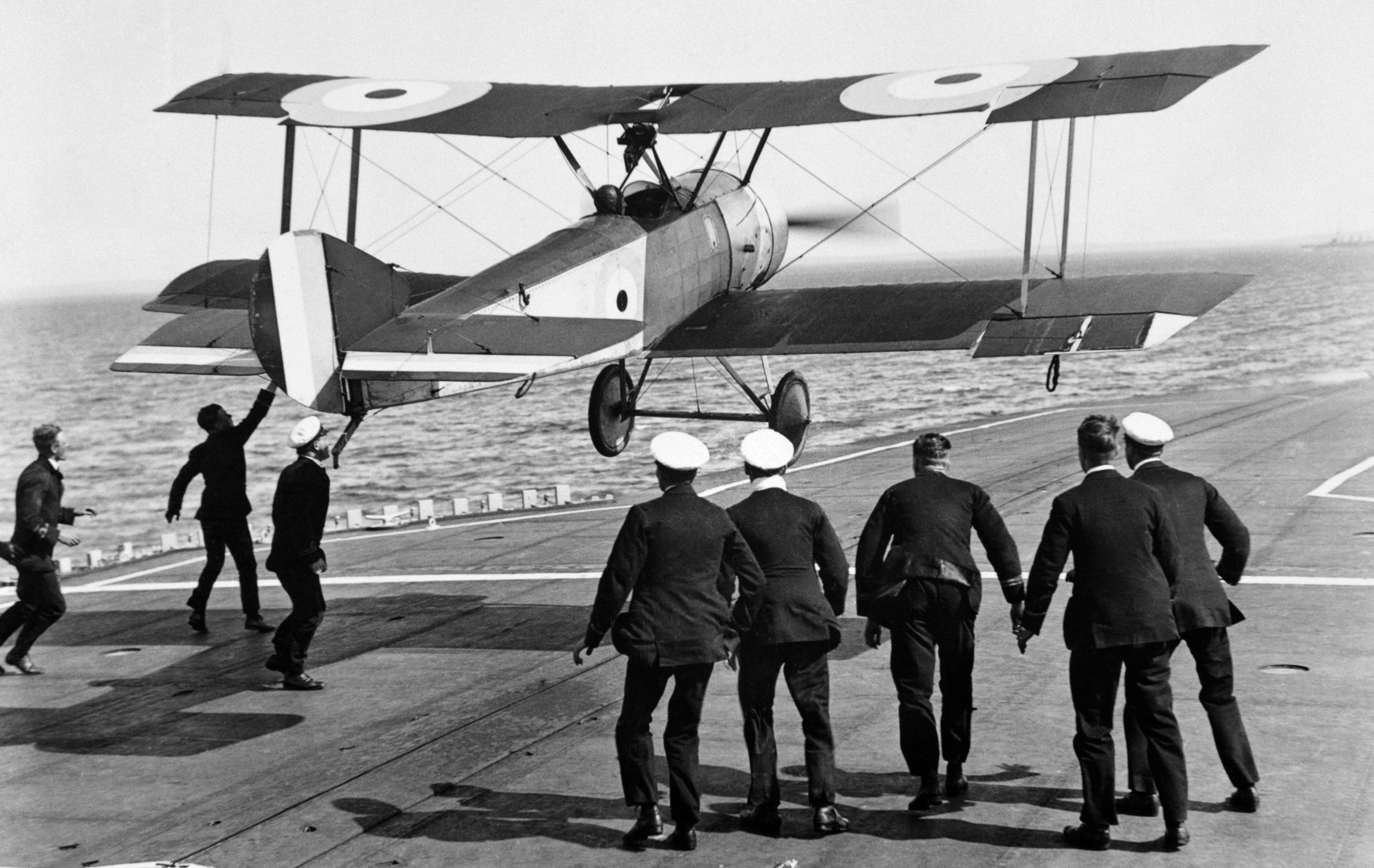
Sqn. Cdr. E. H. Dunning makes the first-ever aircraft landing on a moving ship, a Sopwith Pup biplane onto HMS Furious, 2 August 1917

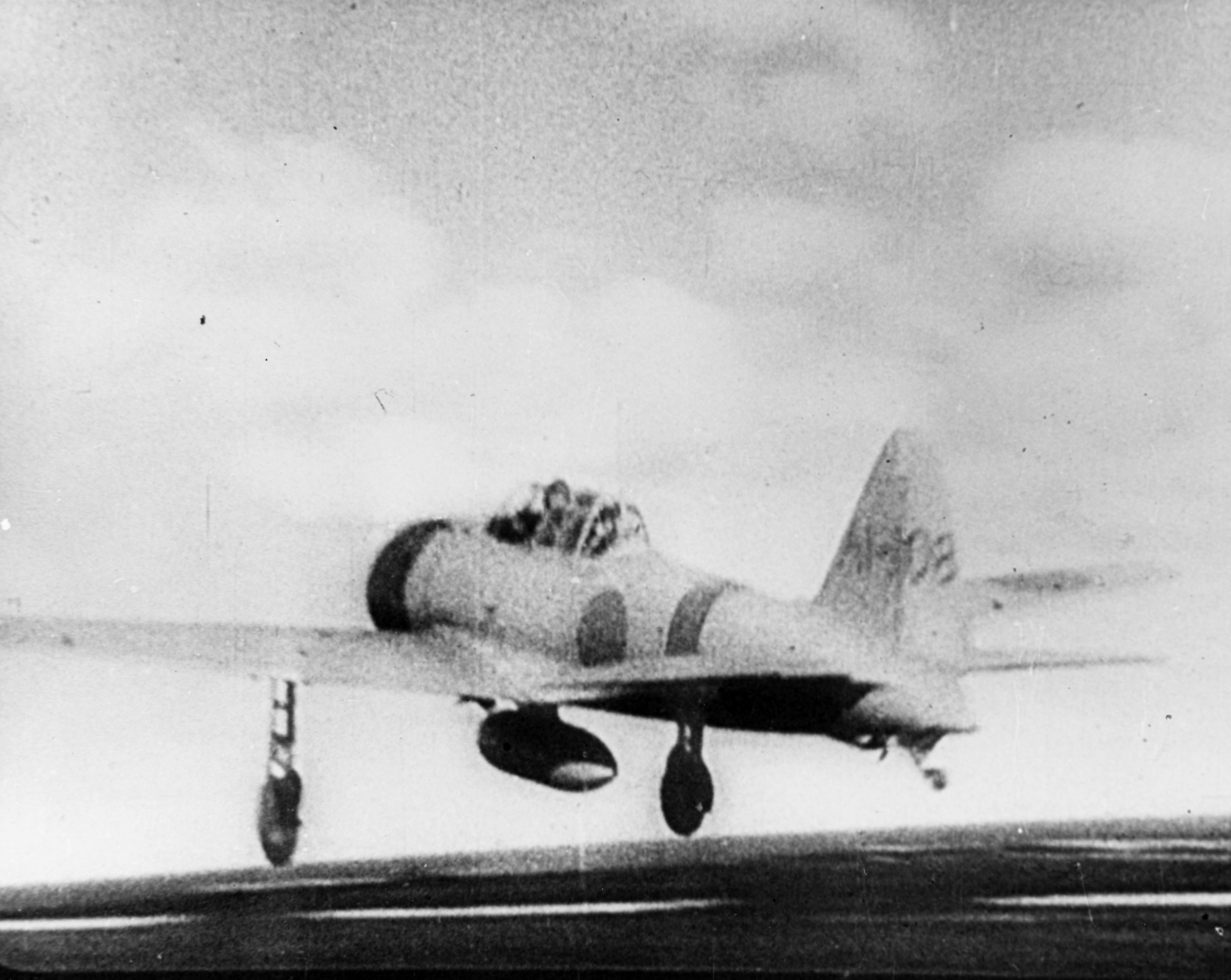
An Model 21 "Zero" takes off from the IJN aircraft carrier Akagi to attack Pearl Harbor

Early carrier-based aircraft are light aircraft by modern standards, and can perform takeoff and landing from an aircraft carrier's flight deck. Up to World War II, the weight of most shipborne fixed-wing aircraft allowed them to be launched from carriers under their own engine power, but might require assistance in braking the aircraft upon landing. Early aircraft catapults were installed on some warships but were used only to launch seaplanes when the ship was stationary or adequate wind over the deck could not be arranged by sailing into the wind. Even aircraft as large as the North American B-25 Mitchell were launched in this manner. This was possible because the ship's speed with even the lightest prevailing winds, combined with a low take-off speed allowed early aircraft to gain flying speed in a very short distance. The most extreme version of this was the battleship platforms used during the 1920s when small, World War I-era biplane fighters such as the Sopwith Camel were launched from only a few dozen feet long mounted atop of a battleship's forward gun turret.

Conventional propeller aircraft, such as the Curtiss P-40 Warhawk, Republic P-47 Thunderbolt, Supermarine Spitfire, and Hawker Hurricane, were often delivered to overseas airbases by aircraft carrier. They would be loaded onto an aircraft carrier in port by cranes, flown off the carrier at sea near their destination under their own power, and land on a friendly airfield ashore. These were not usually combat missions but in some cases the launched aircraft provided air cover for the ship, and the aircraft could not be recovered by the carrier.

Some STOL aircraft, such as the North American Rockwell OV-10 Bronco, have been operated from aircraft carriers and amphibious assault ships in this manner more recently, but this is not common practice.

Even very large aircraft such as the Lockheed C-130 Hercules have been successfully landed and launched from large aircraft carriers, but was done with no cargo and little fuel on board the aircraft.

=== Catapult-assisted take-off but arrested recovery ===
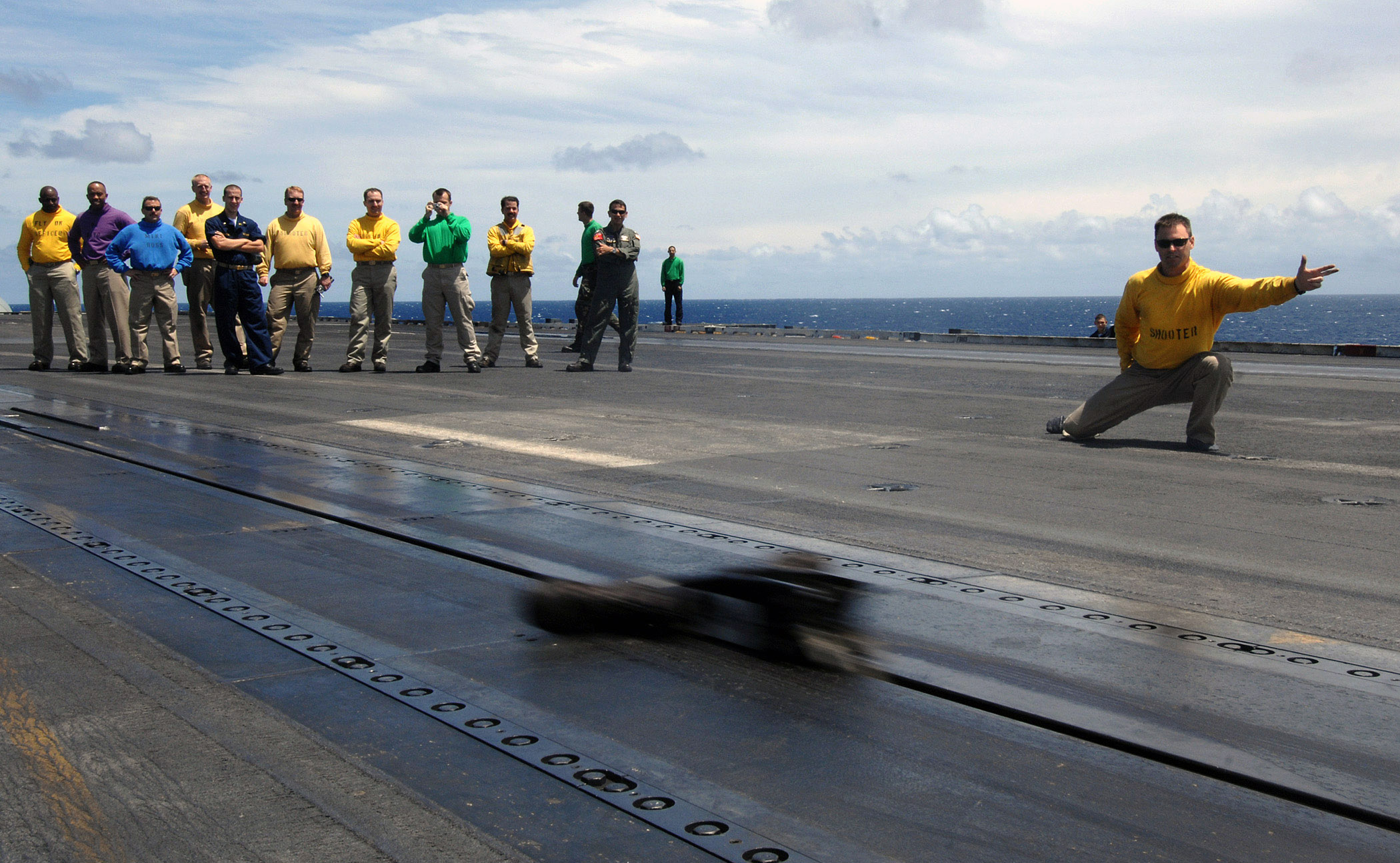
Steam catapult system in action (without an aircraft)

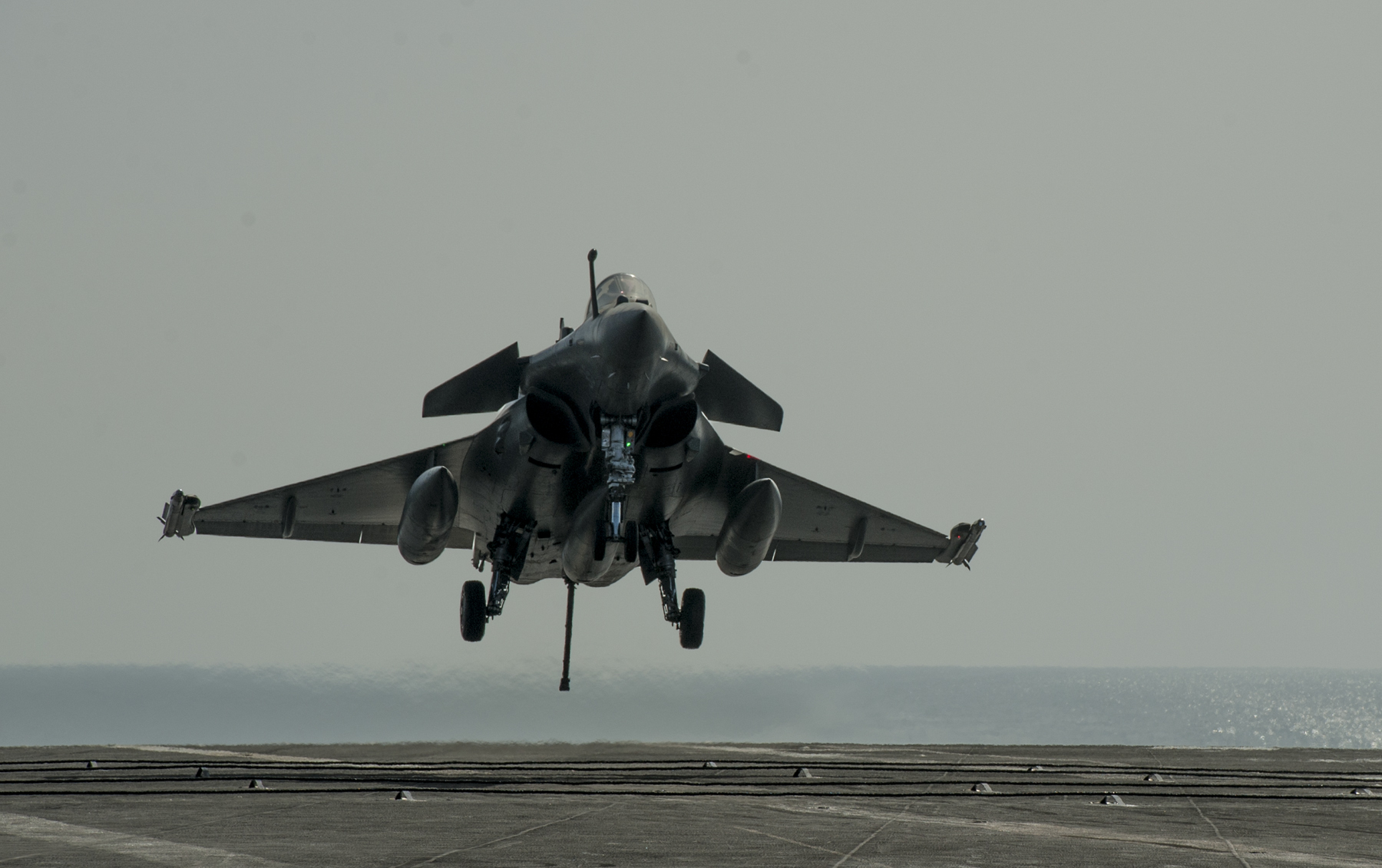
A Dassault Rafale M with its tailhook deployed and ready to catch an arresting wire

Catapult-assisted take-off but arrested recovery (CATOBAR) is a system used for the launch and recovery of heavier aircraft (particularly jet aircraft) from the flight deck of an aircraft carrier via assisted take-off by an aircraft catapult. When taking off, the aircraft taxis itself in front of a jet blast deflector and the catapult shuttle is attached to its nose gear, and when released for launch, the catapult imparts a forward acceleration in addition to the aircraft's own propulsion, allowing it to achieve minimum takeoff speed quickly despite a very short runway. On landing, the approaching aircraft is guided by an optical landing system and decelerates by latching a tailhook onto one of the arresting wires. Although this system is more costly to build and maintain, it provides greater flexibility in carrier operations, since it allows the aircraft to operate with higher payloads. CATOBAR carriers currently include the United States Navy's Nimitz-class and Gerald R. Ford-class supercarriers, the French Navy's Charles de Gaulle, and the Chinese aircraft carrier Fujian.

Most modern aircraft carrier flight decks are no longer than 330 m (1,080 ft), with barely half of that length being dedicated to take-offs while the rest are angled flight deck reserved as the landing runway and parking spaces. The use of catapults allows an aircraft carrier to not only launch heavy fixed-wing aircraft, but also from a runway distance less than 150 m (490 ft), from which take-offs would be otherwise be impossible. For example, the U.S. Navy launches its E-2 Hawkeye AEW aircraft and C-2A Greyhound cargo aircraft with catapults.

=== Short take-off but arrested recovery ===
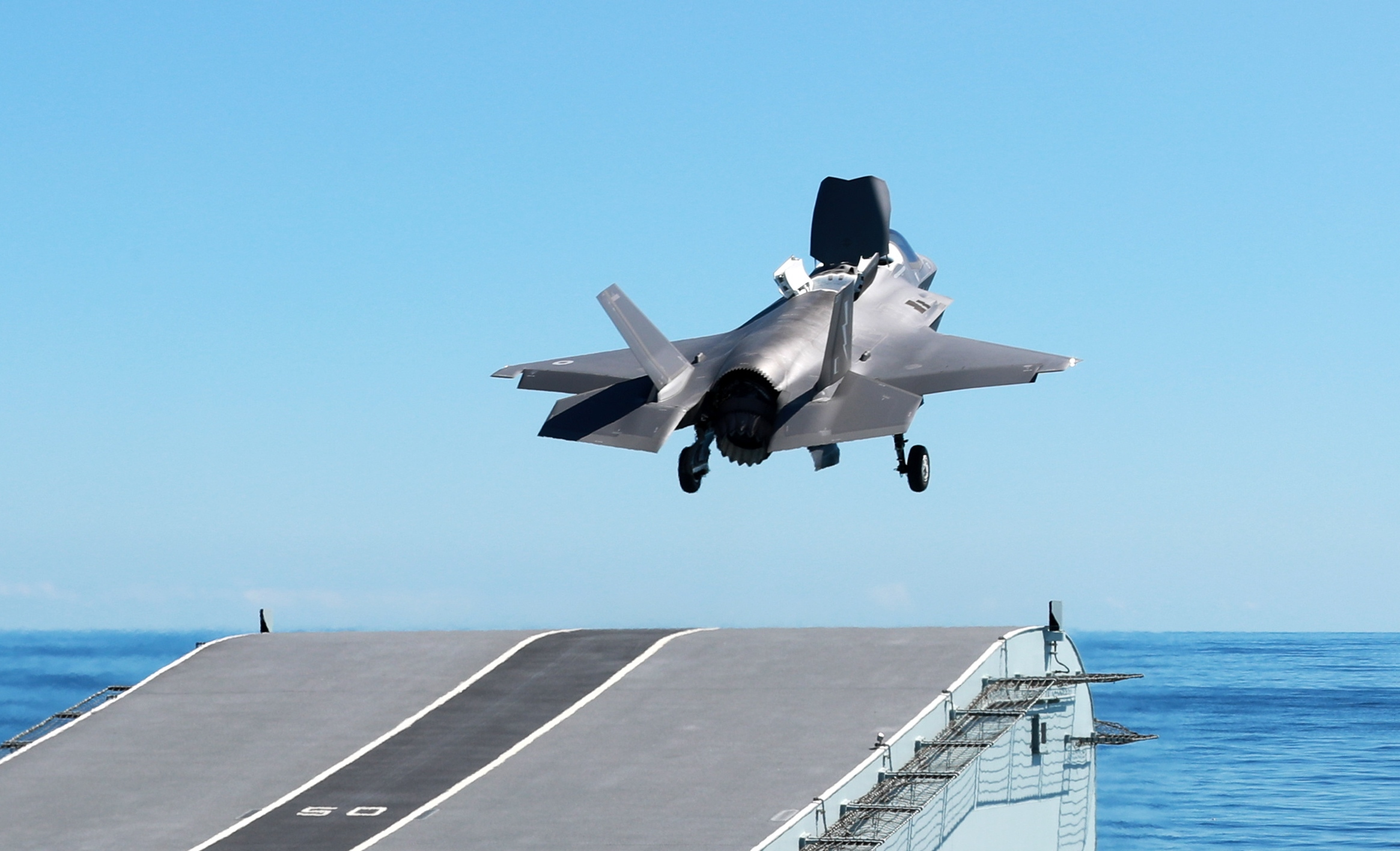
An F-35B utilizes a ski-jump to become airborne off the deck of HMS Queen Elizabeth

Short take-off but arrested recovery (STOBAR) is a system used for launching and recovery of aircraft by having them launch via an upward ramp known as a ski-jump, which imparts the aircraft a positive rate of climb upon take-off so it stays airborne longer for further acceleration under their own propulsion before finally achieving enough airspeed to continue flying. When landing, the aircraft uses tailhook and arresting gears just like the CATOBAR system. The STOBAR systems allow aircraft to be launched from carriers without catapults, and are cheaper and less sophisticated to construct and maintain than CATOBAR systems, but the trade-off is a lower maximum takeoff weight of the launched aircraft, which often have to reduce payload of fuel and ordnance, thus decreasing the practical radius of action and firepower of the carrier air wing. STOBAR carriers currently in service include the Kuznetsov-class aircraft carriers of the Russian Navy and Chinese People's Liberation Army Navy, who operate the Su-33 and J-15 multirole fighters, respectively; and the Indian Navy's Vikramaditya and Vikrant, both of which will operate MiG-29Ks.

=== Short take-off and vertical landing ===
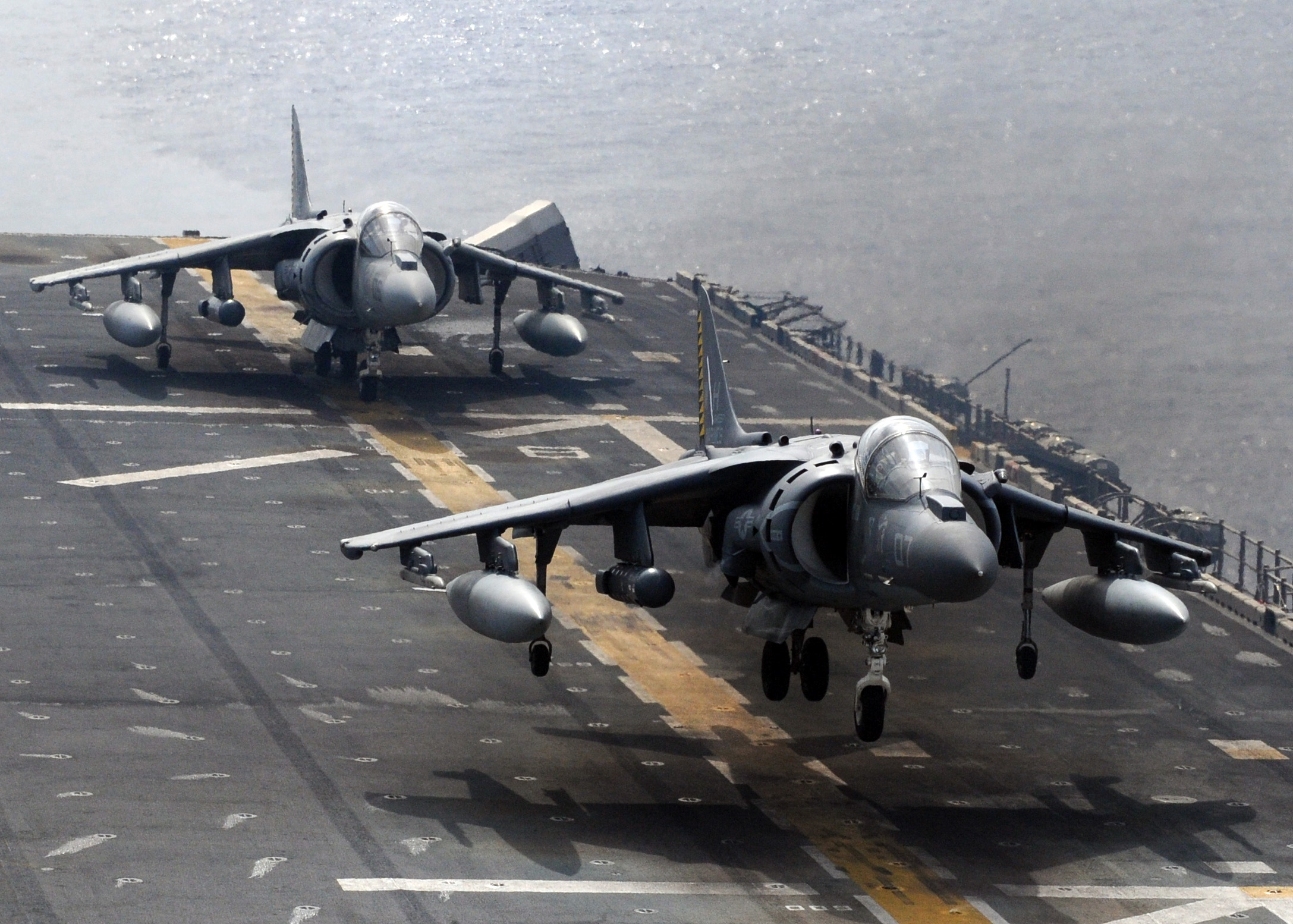
An AV-8B Harrier jump jet prepares to land aboard the USS Essex (LHD 2).

Short take-off and vertical landing (STOVL) aircraft perform short-distance take-offs usually by means of ski-jumps, but perform thrust vectoring-assisted vertical landing. STOVL use usually allows aircraft to carry a larger payload as compared to during VTOL use, while avoiding the complexity of catapult and arrestor gears. The best known example is the Hawker Siddeley Harrier Jump Jet, despite being capable of VTOL take-offs, is usually operated as a STOVL aircraft to increase its fuel and weapons load.

== Modern carrier-based aircraft in service ==
=== In service ===
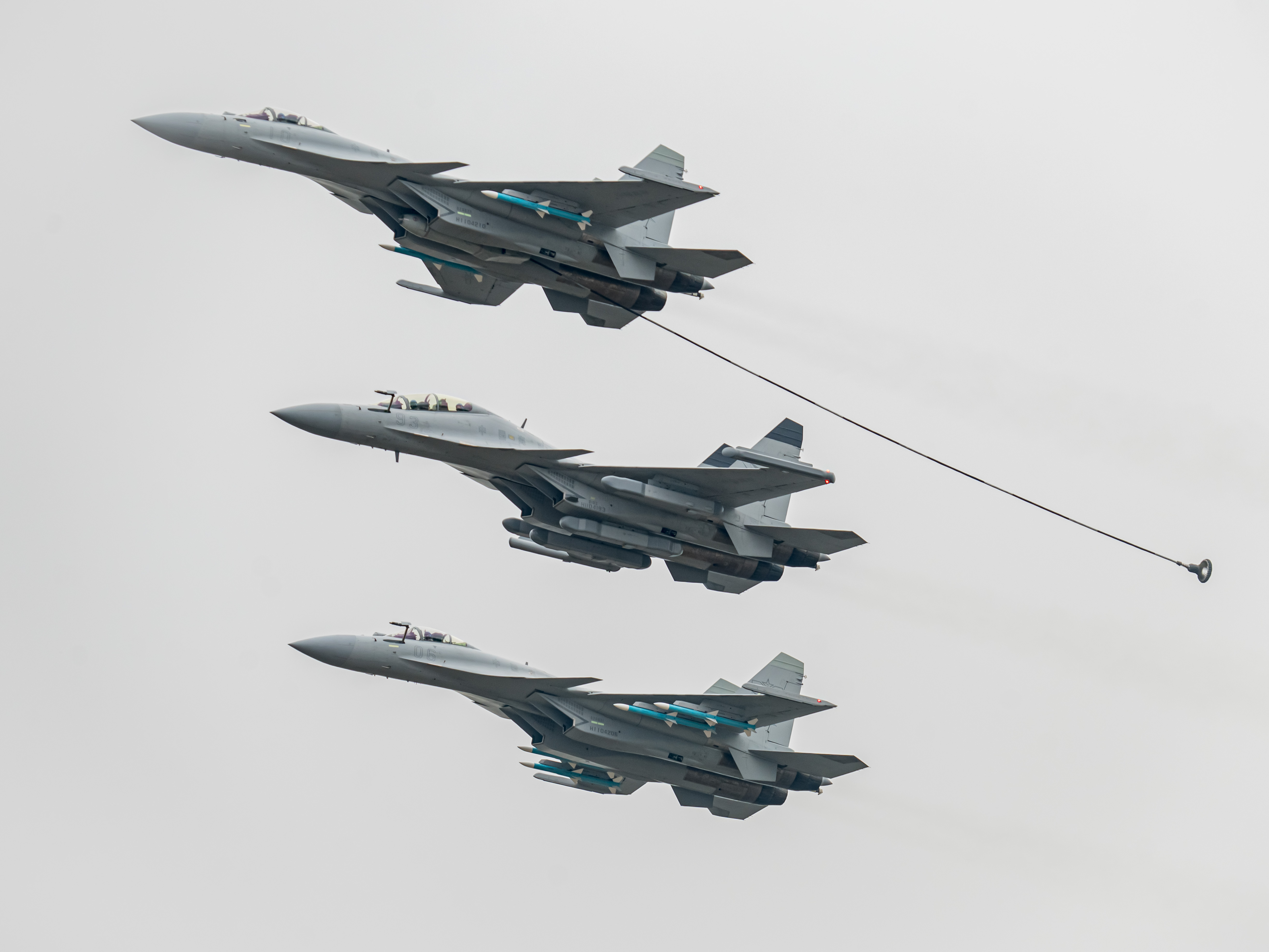
Two Shenyang J-15TTs and a J-15D in Zhuhai Airshow 2024

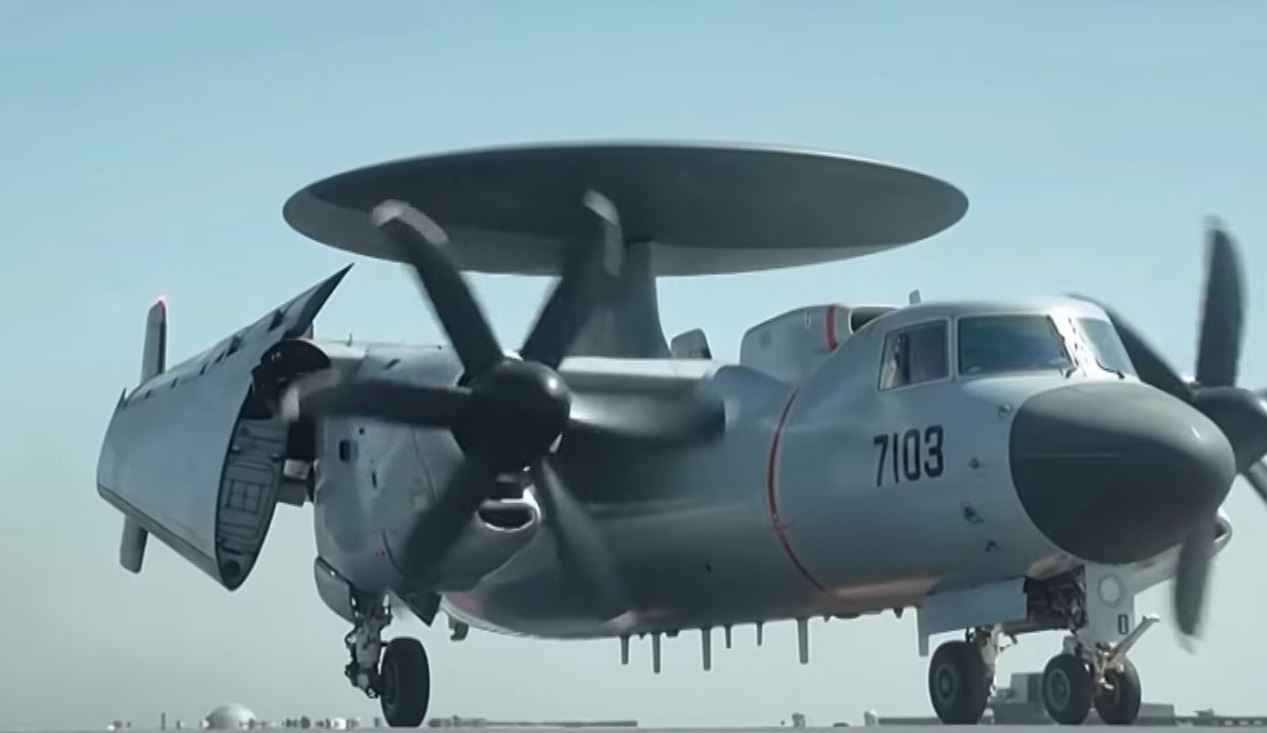
Xi'an KJ-600 airborne early warning and control (AEW&C) aircraft aboard Fujian's flight deck with its wings folded

- Bayraktar TB3
- Bell Boeing CMV-22B Osprey
- Boeing EA-18G Growler
- Boeing F/A-18E/F Super Hornet
- Dassault Rafale M
- Lockheed Martin F-35B/C Lightning II
- McDonnell Douglas AV-8B Harrier II
- McDonnell Douglas F/A-18 Hornet
- McDonnell Douglas T-45 Goshawk
- Mikoyan MiG-29K
- Northrop Grumman E-2 Hawkeye
- Shenyang J-15
- Shenyang J-35
- Sukhoi Su-25UTG/UBP
- Sukhoi Su-33
- Xi'an KJ-600

=== Under development ===
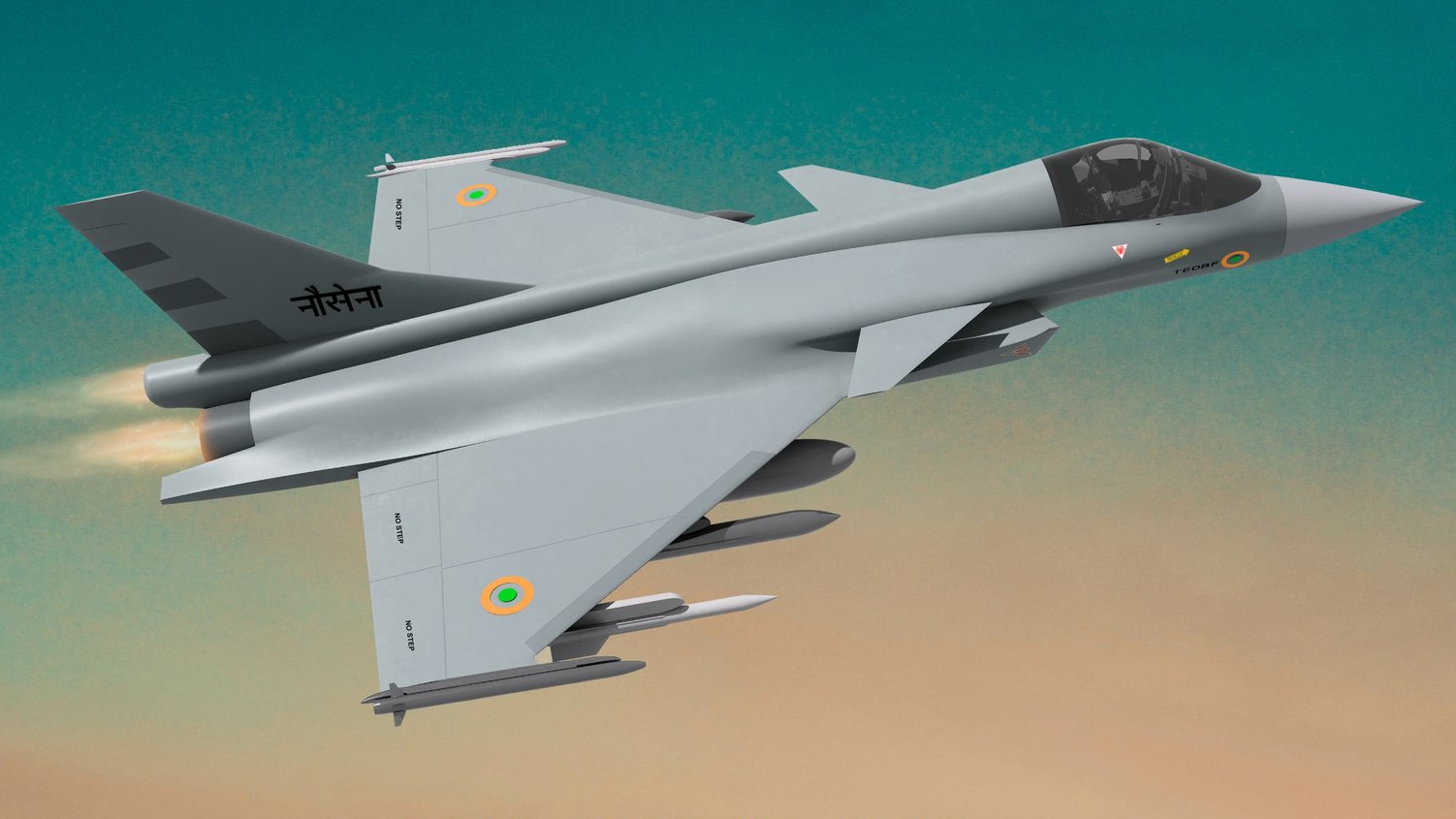
HAL TEDBF design

- Bayraktar Kızılelma
- Boeing F/A-XX
- Boeing MQ-25 Stingray
- HAL TEDBF
- Shenyang J-50

=== Cancelled ===
- HAL Tejas Naval

== See also ==
- Escort carrier
- Launch and recovery cycle
- Modern United States Navy carrier air operations
- Naval aviation
- Carrier aircraft used during World War II
