= Joint-use airport =

Airport that is used for both military and civil purposes

A joint-use airport is an aerodrome that is used for both military aviation and civil aviation. They typically contain facilities of both a civil airport and a military air base.

== By country ==
=== Indonesia ===
Juanda Airport, Halim Perdanakusuma Airport, Sultan Hasanuddin International Airport operates as a civilian and navy air force on an Indonesian Navy airbase Indonesian Air Force

=== Japan ===
In Japan, Ibaraki Airport, Komatsu Airport, MCAS Iwakuni, Miho-Yonago Airport, Misawa Airport, Naha Airport, Saga Airport, Shimojishima Airport and Tokushima Airport are joint-use airports with facilities shared by civilians and the JSDF and/or USFJ.

=== Lithuania ===
Šiauliai International Airport uses runways and infrastructure of the Šiauliai Air Base owned by the Lithuanian Air Force.

=== Singapore ===
In Singapore, Changi Air Base shares runway facilities with Singapore Changi Airport, the country's main international airport.

=== Taiwan ===
In Taiwan, Taichung International Airport, Taichung's main international airport, shares runway facilities with Ching Chuan Kang Air Base, the main air base in central Taiwan.

=== United Kingdom ===
Although most of the military airbases in the UK are without a commercial component, Belfast International Airport uses several facilities of the former RAF Aldergrove, which closed as an airbase in 2009, but continues use as a helicopter station.

=== United States ===
The United States has several joint-use airports in Federal Aviation Administration records, where they are also described as shared-use airports. One example is Destin-Fort Walton Beach Airport, which utilizes the runway and ATC services of Eglin Air Force Base. Charleston International Airport uses the runways and services of Charleston Air Force Base. Both civil airports, however, operate their own passenger terminals and taxiways. Charleston also has private fixed-base operators on the civilian side of the field catering to the general flying public.

== Enclaves ==
In some cases, if one type of operations is considered the primary user or owner of the airport, the other user may sometimes be described as an enclave.

=== Civil enclave ===
A civil enclave is an area at a military air base allotted for the usage of civil aviation. Civil enclaves are common in countries like India, Sri Lanka, and Pakistan where a part of an air base, almost invariably a legacy of World War II vintage, is allotted for domestic air traffic instead of building a new civilian airport. These airports usually have a curfew (mostly after sunset) during which civil aircraft are not permitted to operate. Many reserve morning hours for military flight training. Some civil enclaves adopt an altitude restriction, i.e., one below which a civilian aircraft cannot descend while over-flying the enclave. The curfew system may result in airport congestion while the altitude restriction can cause long detours and greater fuel consumption.

Air traffic control at civil enclaves is usually entrusted to the armed forces or it may be a joint civilian-military crew. In some countries security is the responsibility of military personnel; in others, civil security authorities such as the Transportation Security Administration in the United States retain responsibility for all civilian aviation security. It is generally accepted that the military receives revenues from civil use of ATC services if they own and operate them, but in some countries, it is not clear as to whether capital expenditure for improvements such as runway expansion is the responsibility of the military or civilian authorities. One example in India is Goa's Dabolim Airport at Dabolim.

=== Military enclave ===
The obverse, a military enclave, is an area of a civil airport that is allocated for use by the military. It is common in the United States; many Air National Guard operations take place at smaller regional airports run by civil authorities. Airports containing ANG enclaves include McGhee Tyson Airport, Harrisburg International Airport and Kalamazoo-Battle Creek International Airport among many others; virtually every state without a major Air Force base has military operations present in at least one civilian airport.

Ahmedabad's Sardar Vallabhbhai Patel International Airport in India and Hazrat Shahjalal International Airport in Bangladesh are examples of South Asian military enclaves.

== See also ==
- International airport
- Domestic airport
- Satellite airfield
- Wayport
