= Food hubs =

A food hub, as defined by the USDA, is “a centrally located facility with a business management structure facilitating the aggregation, storage, processing, distributions, and/or marketing of locally/regionally produced food products.” Food hubs are a part of the agricultural value chain model and often share common values relating to conservation, sustainability, healthy food access, and supporting local farmers. A defining characteristic of food hubs is source identification, a food safety and marketing benefit that allows consumers to trace the origin of products they buy. One of the primary goals of food hubs is to give small and medium-sized farmers access to larger or additional markets. Food hubs also fill gaps in food systems infrastructure, such as transportation, product storage, and product processing. Although companies and organizations that fit the USDA definition have been operating in the United States since at least the early 1970s, most food hubs, as well as the common use of the term, started in or after 2008.

diagram of a food hub

== Core functions ==
Food hubs handle some or all of the following:

- Aggregation: Compile products from different suppliers/farms to distribute through a single channel
- Distribution: Store products and transport them to the customer
- Marketing and sales: Find buyers, sell and advertise products, and promote farms’ brand identities

== Types ==
Food hubs are generally categorized into three different types.

- Retail or Farm to Consumer (F2C): This model gives farmers more access to high-value markets by distributing products directly to consumers online, in a retail space, or via a community-supported agriculture (CSA) subscription.
- Wholesale or Farm to Business/Institution (F2B):This model gives farmers access to high-volume markets such as schools, grocery stores, hospitals, and restaurants that they couldn’t normally obtain on their own due to lack of volume or consistency. This method of aggregating products to meet higher volume needs is more efficient for buyers and makes it easier for them to buy regionally throughout the year.
- Hybrid: This model includes both retail and wholesale operations. A food hub may be set up as a non-profit organization, a for-profit business, or a cooperative.

== See also ==
- Agricultural cooperative
- Local food
