= Wayport =

A wayport is a major airport, built on the outskirts of or away from an urban area, having the primary purpose of serving connecting and origin destination flights, cargo, express mail and general aviation as part of the national airport network. Wayports have been proposed as a potential solution in the United States to deal with increasing congestion and delays at major urban airports.

No wayports have been built, but the idea is being considered by the Federal Aviation Administration as it reviews future needs of the air transportation network in the United States. Due to the high number of connecting passengers, cargo and express mail using city airports which are neither the passengers' origin nor destination, wayports could offload some of this demand by funneling these passengers through facilities designed expressly for this purpose, allowing city airports to deal primarily with passengers originating or terminating their travel at that location. This would increase city airport capacity without new construction.

For example, Pittsburgh International Airport is an existing major airport that is currently vastly underused on account of the loss of US Airways hub status in the early 2000s. Its fully modern air traffic control and ground operations capabilities, in conjunction with its three parallel runways, give it the ability to easily handle a high number of aircraft operations per hour, even in poor weather conditions. Estimates indicate that only 15% of the airport's capacity is being utilized, and therefore the airport has been proposed as a wayport for lessening the tremendous load on congested and delay-prone airspace around Philadelphia International Airport and the New York City airports (Newark, JFK, and LaGuardia).

The concept of wayports has existed for over twenty years but has been touted by former FAA officials James Sheppard and William Shea as an answer for future air system development.

== See also ==
- Airpark
- Aerodrome
- Altiport
- Heliport
- Highway strip
- Joint-use airport
- Naval outlying landing field
- Non-towered airport
- Pilot-controlled lighting
- Satellite airfield
- STOLport
- List of shortest runways
