= STOLport =

Type of airport built specifically for STOL air craft

A STOLport or STOLPORT is an airport designed with STOL (Short Take-Off and Landing) operations in mind, for aircraft capable of taking off and landing on short runways.

A STOLport usually has a short single runway, generally shorter than 1,500 m (5,000 ft). STOLports are only practicable by certain types of aircraft, especially smaller propeller aircraft, with performances that are compatible with the shorter runway length, steeper approach/departure paths, etc. at individual STOLports.

In the United States, short runway facilities are simply known as airports, and the term "STOLport" has not been commonly used since the early 1970s.

== Definition ==
The International Civil Aviation Organization (ICAO) defines STOLports as "unique airports designed to serve airplanes that have exceptional short-field performance capabilities." ICAO Document 9150: Stolport Manual states that "for the purposes of this manual, the stolport design aeroplane is assumed to be an aeroplane that has a reference field length of 800 m or less".

== North America ==
In the United States, a STOLport is one of several types of facilities. STOLports are identified with an S at the end of the site ID. For example, Calvert Peak STOLport is listed as Federal Aviation Administration (FAA) site number 19448.1*S. As of January 2009, around 80 facilities were coded as STOLports by the FAA in the United States. According to the FAA in 1968, twenty-five potential STOLport sites were identified in the Northeast megalopolis. In the early 1970s, a study was conducted to help the FAA determine if it was necessary to create an elevated STOLport test facility. At one point in 1968, a 730 m (2,400 ft) STOLport was under consideration for a rooftop in Manhattan. Toronto City Airport, with the longest runway of 1,216 m (3,988 ft), went into a period of decline in the 1980s and 1990s, but has since been revitalized as a city centre airport by Porter Airlines, flying the 400 series De Havilland Canada Dash 8. However, it is not officially designated as a STOLport.

== Scotland ==
In the islands of Scotland there are some airports with very short runways, but still having scheduled flights. Examples include Colonsay Airport (501 m [1,644 ft]), Foula Airfield (382 m [1,252 ft]) and Westray Airport (527 m [1,729 ft]). They are usually serviced by Britten-Norman Islander aircraft.

== Spain ==
Melilla Airport is an STOLport in the African city of Melilla. Its runway has been extended from 2,460 ft to 4,701 ft. Currently it is mainly operated by ATR 72 that connect Melilla to the Iberian Peninsula.

== Norway and Greenland ==
Between 1965 and 1987, approximately 30 STOLports were built in Norway, typically equipped with a 2,600 ft (800 m) runway. They were intended to improve transportation systems and shorten travel times to areas that were considered difficult to reach by other means. In Norwegian, they are called "kortbaneflyplass" (literally "short runway airport"). As they were built in areas with relatively low population density and terrain that often wouldn't permit a standard length runway, it became essential to build shorter runways and use smaller airplanes. Today, the airports are frequented by airliners that have been awarded subsidies from the Norwegian government. They typically fly feeder routes to larger hub airports that have direct routes to Oslo and other major cities in Norway. Though most of the routes are flown by Widerøe, other airliners occasionally win bids on some of the routes.

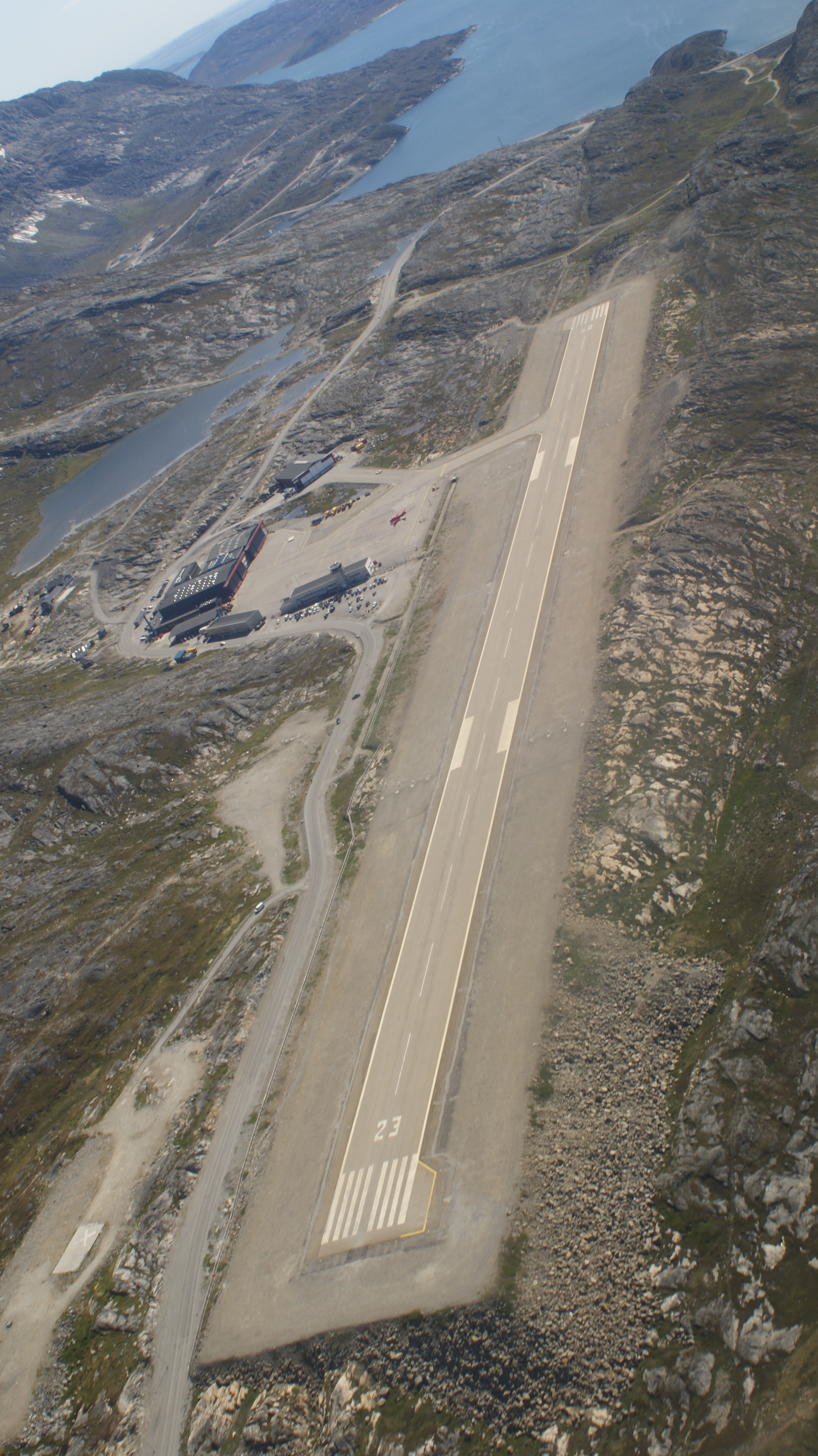
950 m (3,120 ft) former runway of Nuuk Airport, Greenland. It has since been rebuilt to 2,200 m (7,200 ft).

Based on the Norwegian example, several short runway airports (800–900 m [2,600–3,000 ft]) were built in Greenland, replacing heliports. The country at that time only had a few airports, built by United States forces in hidden locations far from Greenlandic settlements. Still the short runway airports (including at the capital Nuuk) can't accept flights from distant places like Denmark or the United Kingdom. Some of the airports of Iceland are STOLports, although most are longer. The availability of STOL aircraft has enabled Icelandair to extend its network to Greenland.

Avinor, the Norwegian airport authority, worries about the future availability of aircraft for 800 m (2,600 ft) runways in future when older aircraft currently used retire. Currently, Dash 8-100 aircraft, manufactured in the early 1990s, are used. Avinor has found that after 2010, no new aircraft can be bought which have more than 20 seats and are able to use such short runways. For this reason there are plans to extend runways to 1,200 m (3,900 ft) or in some cases to build new airports, and to close some combined with road improvements. The least used will not be extended, but will have to be flown with very small aircraft. Also in Greenland this is discussed for the same reason. Greenland has decided to extend Nuuk and Ilulissat airports to jet aircraft size, 2,200 m (7,200 ft). Rising fuel prices makes low drag a desirable feature, so STOL aircraft might be less desirable or numerous in future. Also aircraft might be able to use short runways only with limited payload, making tickets expensive.

== Historical STOLports ==
Several attempts were undertaken at the late 1960s and early 1970s to create STOLports in the United States for the New York City and Los Angeles, California areas; however, most are not operational or no longer in existence at the present time. There was also Victoria STOLport in Montreal, Quebec, Canada.

The first United States STOLport for commercial operation was commissioned August 5, 1968, at La Guardia Airport and was available for visual flight rules (VFR) use only. This 334 m (1,095 ft) STOL runway was dubbed the LaGuardia STOLPORT.

The first officially designated STOLport in the United States opened on October 17, 1971, at the Walt Disney World Resort in Florida. Shawnee Airlines operated scheduled passenger service between the Walt Disney World Airport (also known as the Lake Buena Vista STOLport) and Orlando McCoy Jetport (now the Orlando International Airport) as well as the Tampa International Airport with de Havilland Canada DHC-6 Twin Otter STOL turboprop aircraft. Information concerning the Shawnee Airlines STOL service appeared in the Eastern Air Lines system timetable dated September 6, 1972 with regard to connecting service between the two airlines at either Orlando or Tampa. The 610 m (2,000 ft) STOL runway at this former airport is no longer in use. Prior to that date, only portions of facilities were designated STOLports. Plans at the time called for an interstate STOL transportation system. On July 26, 1972; the FAA V/STOL office was renamed to the Quiet Short-Haul Air Transportation System Office refocusing it and reflecting public concerns about noise created by smaller more numerous STOLports as opposed to larger airports. The Quiet Short-Haul Air Transportation System Office was eliminated June 11, 1974. Logan International Airport opened an 550 m (1,800 ft) STOL runway September 20, 1968 for testing Eastern Air Lines STOL capable Bréguet 941 turboprop shuttle on east coast routes.

Some STOLports were never open to public aviation and were privately owned, such as the Avon STOLPort, a 1,200 m (4,000 ft) runway located adjacent to the town of Avon, Colorado that was constructed specifically to handle tourist flights for nearby ski resorts in the Vail area. The Avon STOLPort was owned and operated by Rocky Mountain Airways which operated de Havilland Canada Dash 7 STOL turboprops from this mountain airfield from 1978 through 1989. The Avon STOLport is no longer in existence.

Another privately owned STOL airfield was the Clear Lake City STOLport located in the Houston, Texas area, near the Johnson Space Center. This small airport which included a 760 m (2,500 ft) runway, an aircraft hangar, and a passenger terminal was constructed in 1969 and owned by Houston Metro Airlines which later changed its name to Metro Airlines. The airline operated Twin Otters from this suburban airfield with shuttle service to Houston Intercontinental Airport. According to the February 1, 1976 Official Airline Guide (OAG), Houston Metro was operating 22 round trip flights on weekdays between Clear Lake City and Houston Intercontinental. After Metro Airlines decided to pursue other avenues of business in the airline industry, the Clear Lake City STOLport was abandoned and then demolished to make way for new suburban development. There is no trace remaining of this pioneering airfield.

== STOLport airlines ==
Rocky Mountain Airways was the worldwide launch customer of the de Havilland Canada Dash 7 four engine turboprop STOL aircraft. Rocky Mountain selected the 50-passenger Dash 7 specifically for the purpose of transporting passengers into high mountain airports with short runways such as the Avon STOLport located near Vail, Colorado from its hub located at Stapleton International Airport in Denver from 1978 through 1989. The airline also utilized the Dash 7 for scheduled flights into the small Steamboat Springs Airport in Colorado. Rocky Mountain first began airline operations with de Havilland DHC-6 Twin Otter aircraft before subsequently commencing Dash 7 service and only operated STOL capable aircraft during its existence.

Norwegian Widerøe are one of the biggest STOLport operators in Europe as they have a fleet of over 40 Bombardier aircraft they mostly use on short runways in Northern and Western Norway.

Houston Metro Airlines operated Twin Otters in scheduled "cross-town" air service between the Clear Lake City STOLport in Clear Lake City, Texas and Houston Intercontinental Airport which had a dedicated STOL runway at the time. According to the February 1976 edition of the OAG, the airline was operating 22 round trip flights every weekday between Clear Lake City and Houston Intercontinental in a passenger shuttle service.

SKS Airways from Malaysia launched its commercial operation in January 2022 by focusing on STOLports situated on domestic holiday islands. Its initial operation will be traveling back and forth using a Twin Otter type aircraft from either Subang or Senai airport to the islands of Pangkor, Redang and Tioman. It will also operate cargo and charter services between these locations. In the long run, they are planning to expand their network to major cities in Malaysia and other locations in Southeast Asia and Southern China.

== See also ==
- Airpark
- Altiport
- Highway strip
- List of shortest runways
- Satellite airfield
- Wayport
