= Satellite airfield =

Satellite airfields are landing strips not regarded as main airfields as such but must be taken as a substitute in one way to a larger nearby airfield. The way this can be done may vary such as the allocation of flight paths and other functions to the satellite in order to relieve the pressure of flight operations of the main airfield.

Royal Air Force Relief Landing Grounds (RLGs) are an example of a satellite airfield.

== Examples ==
- Jervis Bay Airfield
- Naval Air Station Kingsville
- Naval Air Station Whidbey Island

== See also ==
- Airpark
- Aerodrome
- Heliport
- Highway strip
- Joint-use airport
- Naval outlying landing field
- Non-towered airport
- Pilot-controlled lighting
- STOLport
- List of shortest runways
