= List of United States Navy airfields =

This is a list of airfields operated by the United States Navy which are located within the United States and abroad. The US Navy's main airfields are designated as Naval Air Stations or Naval Air Facilities, with Naval Outlying Landing Fields (NOLF) and Naval Auxiliary Landing Fields (NALF) having a support role.

Some airfields are parented by a larger naval installation or are part of a Joint Base operated jointly with another part of the US military.

== Active airfields ==
=== Naval air stations and other airfields ===
Active US Navy airfields within the United States
Installation name	Airfield name	Location	State	Installation emblem	Parent installation	Region	Ref.
Pacific Missile Range Facility Barking Sands	N/A	Kauaʻi	Hawaii		N/A	Navy Region Hawaii	
Naval Station Norfolk – Chambers Field	Chambers Field	Norfolk	Virginia		Naval Station Norfolk	Navy Region Mid-Atlantic	
Naval Air Weapons Station China Lake	Armitage Field	Ridgecrest	California		N/A	Navy Region Southwest	
Naval Air Station Corpus Christi	Truax Field	Corpus Christi	Texas		N/A	Navy Region Southeast	
Naval Support Facility Dahlgren	N/A	Dahlgren	Virginia		Naval Support Activity South Potomac	Naval District Washington	
Naval Air Facility El Centro	Vraciu Field	Seeley	California		N/A	Navy Region Southwest	
Naval Air Station Fallon	Van Voorhis Field	Fallon	Nevada		N/A	Navy Region Southwest	
Naval Air Station Joint Reserve Base Fort Worth	Carswell Field	Fort Worth	Texas		N/A	Navy Region Southeast	
Naval Air Station Jacksonville	Towers Field	Jacksonville	Florida		N/A	Navy Region Southeast	
Naval Air Station Key West	Boca Chica Field	Key West	Florida		N/A	Navy Region Southeast	
Naval Air Station Kingsville	N/A	Kingsville	Texas		N/A	Navy Region Southeast	
Naval Support Activity Lakehurst	Lakehurst Maxfield Field	Lakehurst	New Jersey		Joint Base McGuire–Dix–Lakehurst	Navy Region Mid-Atlantic	
Naval Air Station Lemoore	Reeves Field	Lemoore	California		N/A	Navy Region Southwest	
Naval Station Mayport	Admiral David L. McDonald Field	Mayport	Florida		N/A	Navy Region Southeast	
Naval Air Station Meridian	McCain Field	Meridian	Mississippi		N/A	Navy Region Southeast	
Naval Air Station Joint Reserve Base New Orleans	Alvin Callender Field	Belle Chasse	Louisiana		N/A	Navy Region Southeast	
Naval Air Station North Island	Halsey Field	San Diego	California		Naval Base Coronado	Navy Region Southwest	
Naval Air Station Oceana	Apollo Soucek Field	Virginia Beach	Virginia		N/A	Navy Region Mid-Atlantic	
Naval Air Station Patuxent River	Trapnell Field	St. Mary's County	Maryland		N/A	Naval District Washington	
Naval Air Station Pensacola	Forrest Sherman Field	Pensacola	Florida		N/A	Navy Region Southeast	
Naval Base Ventura County – Point Mugu	Point Mugu	Oxnard	California		Naval Base Ventura County	Navy Region Southwest	
Naval Air Facility Washington	N/A	Camp Springs	Maryland		Joint Base Andrews	Naval District Washington	
Naval Air Station Whidbey Island	Ault Field	Oak Harbor	Washington		N/A	Navy Region Northwest	
Naval Air Station Whiting Field	NAS Whiting Field – North and NAS Whiting Field – South	Milton	Florida		N/A	Navy Region Southeast	

=== Outlying and auxiliary landing fields ===
A naval outlying landing field (NOLF) or naval auxiliary landing field (NALF) is an auxiliary airfield with no based units or aircraft, and minimal facilities. They are used as a low-traffic locations for flight training, without the risks and distractions of other traffic at naval air stations or other large airfields.

Active US Navy outlying landing fields and naval auxiliary landing fields within the United States
Installation name	Airfield name	Location	State	Parent installation	Region	Ref.
Naval Outlying Landing Field Barin	N/A	Foley	Alabama	Naval Air Station Whiting Field	Navy Region Southeast	
Naval Outlying Landing Field Brewton	N/A	Brewton	Alabama	Naval Air Station Whiting Field	Navy Region Southeast	
Naval Outlying Landing Field Cabaniss	N/A	Corpus Christi	Texas	Naval Air Station Corpus Christi	Navy Region Southeast	
Naval Outlying Landing Field Choctaw	N/A	Milton	Florida	Naval Air Station Whiting Field	Navy Region Southeast	
Naval Outlying Landing Field Coupeville	N/A	Coupeville	Washington	Naval Air Station Whidbey Island	Navy Region Northwest	
Naval Auxiliary Landing Field Fentress	N/A	Chesapeake	Virginia	Naval Air Station Oceana	Navy Region Mid-Atlantic	
Naval Outlying Landing Field Evergreen	Middleton Field	Evergreen	Alabama	Naval Air Station Whiting Field	Navy Region Southeast	
Naval Outlying Landing Field Goliad	N/A	Berclair	Texas	Naval Air Station Corpus Christi	Navy Region Southeast	
Naval Outlying Landing Field Harold	N/A	Harold	Florida	Naval Air Station Whiting Field	Navy Region Southeast	
Naval Outlying Landing Field Imperial Beach	Ream Field	Imperial Beach	California	Naval Base Coronado	Navy Region Southwest	
Naval Outlying Landing Field Joe Williams	N/A	Meridian	Mississippi	Naval Air Station Meridian	Navy Region Southeast	
Naval Auxiliary Landing Field Orange Grove	N/A	Orange Grove	Texas	Naval Air Station Kingsville	Navy Region Southeast	
Naval Outlying Landing Field Pace	N/A	Wallace	Florida	Naval Air Station Whiting Field	Navy Region Southeast	
Naval Auxiliary Landing Field San Clemente Island	Frederick Sherman Field	San Clemente Island	California	Naval Base Ventura County	Navy Region Southwest	
Naval Outlying Landing Field San Nicolas Island	N/A	San Nicolas Island	California	Naval Base Ventura County	Navy Region Southwest	
Naval Outlying Landing Field Santa Rosa	N/A	Milton	Florida	Naval Air Station Whiting Field	Navy Region Southeast	
Naval Outlying Landing Field Site X	N/A	Jay	Florida	Naval Air Station Whiting Field	Navy Region Southeast	
Naval Outlying Landing Field Spencer	N/A	Pace	Florida	Naval Air Station Whiting Field	Navy Region Southeast	
Naval Outlying Landing Field Summerdale	N/A	Summerdale	Alabama	Naval Air Station Whiting Field	Navy Region Southeast	
Naval Outlying Landing Field Waldron	N/A	Corpus Christi	Texas	Naval Air Station Corpus Christi	Navy Region Southeast	
Naval Outlying Landing Field Webster	N/A	St Inigoes	Maryland	Naval Air Station Patuxent River	Naval District Washington	
Naval Outlying Landing Field Whitehouse	N/A	Jacksonville	Florida	Naval Air Station Jacksonville	Navy Region Southeast	

=== Overseas airfields ===
Active US Navy airfields located overseas
Installation name	Location	Country	Installation emblem	Host installation	Region	Ref.
Camp Lemonnier	Djibouti City	Djibouti		Djibouti–Ambouli International Airport	Navy Region Europe, Africa, Central	
Naval Air Facility Atsugi	Kanagawa Prefecture	Japan		N/A	Navy Region Japan	
Naval Support Activity Bahrain	Manama	Bahrain		Bahrain International Airport	Navy Region Europe, Africa, Central	
Naval Support Facility Diego Garcia	Diego Garcia	British Indian Ocean Territory		N/A	Navy Region Japan	
Naval Air Facility Misawa	Aomori Prefecture	Japan		Misawa Air Base	Navy Region Japan	
Naval Station Guantanamo Bay	Guantánamo Bay	Cuba		N/A	Navy Region Southeast	
Naval Support Activity Naples	Naples	Italy		Naples International Airport	Navy Region Europe, Africa, Central	
Naval Station Rota	Rota	Spain		N/A	Navy Region Europe, Africa, Central	
Naval Air Station Sigonella	Sicily	Italy		N/A	Navy Region Europe, Africa, Central	
Naval Support Activity Souda Bay	Crete	Greece		Crete Naval Base	Navy Region Europe, Africa, Central	

== Former airfields ==
=== Naval airfields within the United States ===
Former US Navy airfields located within the United States
Installation name	Location	State	End date	Notes	Ref.
Naval Air Facility Adak	Adak	Alaska	1997	Closed. Transferred to civilian use and became Adak Airport.	
Naval Air Station Akron	Akron	Ohio	1958	Closed. Transferred to civilian use and now Akron Fulton International Airport.	
Naval Air Station Alameda	Alameda	California	1997	Closed. Transferred to City of Alameda for redevelopment as Alameda Point.	
Naval Air Station Albany	Albany	Georgia	1974	Closed. Redeveloped as a brewery in 1979 by Miller Brewing Company.	
Naval Air Station Atlanta	Atlanta	Georgia	2009	Realigned to the Georgia Army National Guard as General Lucius D. Clay National Guard Center	
Naval Air Station Banana River	Cocoa Beach	Florida	1947	Realigned to the US Air Force as Patrick Air Force Base and then transferred to the US Space Force as Patrick Space Force Base in 2020.	
Naval Air Station Barbers Point	Barbers Point	Hawaii		Realigned to US Coast Guard to become CGAS Barbers Point.	
Naval Air Station Bay Shore	Bay Shore	New York	1918		
Naval Air Station Brunswick	Brunswick	Maine	2011	Now Brunswick Executive Airport.	
Naval Air Station Cecil Field	Jacksonville	Florida		Now Cecil Airport with tenant Coast Guard Air Facility Jacksonville and Florida Army National Guard Aviation Support Facility #1	
Naval Air Station Chase Field	Beeville	Texas		Now Chase Industrial Park, an uncontrolled airfield primarily supporting Sikorsky Support Services, Inc.; portion of former base under the control of the Texas Department of Criminal Justice, which operates the Edmundo Mireles Training Academy, as well as two functional prisons on-site)	
Naval Air Station Chatham	Chatham	Massachusetts			
Naval Air Station Columbus	Columbus	Ohio		Now John Glenn Columbus International Airport	
Naval Air Station Dallas	Dallas	Texas			
Naval Air Station Daytona Beach	Daytona Beach	Florida		Now Daytona Beach International Airport	
Naval Air Station DeLand	DeLand	Florida		Now DeLand Municipal Airport	
Naval Air Station Denver	Aurora	Colorado		Initially realigned as Buckley ANGB, now Buckley Space Force Base	
Naval Air Station Ellyson Field	Pensacola	Florida			
Naval Air Station Fort Lauderdale	Fort Lauderdale	Florida		Now Fort Lauderdale-Hollywood International Airport	
Naval Air Station Glenview	Glenview	Illinois			
Naval Air Station Glynco	Brunswick	Georgia		Now Brunswick Golden Isles Airport	
Naval Air Station Greenbury Point	Annapolis	Maryland	1917	Became US Naval Radio Station NSS Annapolis	
Naval Air Station Green Cove Springs	Green Cove Springs	Florida		Now Reynolds Airpark Airport	
Naval Air Station Grosse Ile	Grosse Ile	Michigan		Now Grosse Ile Municipal Airport	
Naval Air Station Hitchcock	Hitchcock	Texas			
Naval Air Station Hutchinson	Hutchinson	Kansas		Initially realigned to the US Air Force and Kansas Air National Guard as Hutchinson Air National Guard Base, now Sunflower Aerodrome Gliderport	
Naval Air Station Kaneohe Bay	Kaneohe	Hawaii		Realigned to US Marine Corps as MCAS Kaneohe Bay	
Naval Air Station Kingsley	Klamath Falls	Oregon		Realigned to the US Air Force and then to the Oregon Air National Guard as Kingsley Field Air National Guard Base	
Naval Air Station Kodiak	Kodiak	Alaska		Realigned as Coast Guard Air Station Kodiak; also functions as Kodiak Airport	
Naval Air Station Lincoln	Lincoln	Nebraska		Realigned as Lincoln Air National Guard Base and co-located Lincoln Airport	
Naval Air Station Litchfield Park	Litchfield Park	Arizona		Now Phoenix Goodyear Airport	
Naval Air Station Los Alamitos	Los Alamitos	California		Realigned to US Army Reserve as Los Alamitos AAF	
Naval Air Station Mayport	Mayport	Florida		Realigned as Naval Station Mayport/Admiral David L. McDonald Field	
Naval Air Station Melbourne	Melbourne	Florida		Now Melbourne International Airport	
Naval Air Station Miami	Opa Locka	Florida		Realigned as MCAS Miami, then as Coast Guard Air Station Miami as a tenant of Opa-Locka Airport	
Naval Air Station Miramar	San Diego	California		Realigned to US Marine Corps as MCAS Miramar	
Naval Air Station Moffett Field	Mountain View	California		Transferred to NASA and redesignated as Moffett Federal Airfield for NASA and the California Air National Guard.	
Naval Air Station Montauk	Montauk	New York			
Naval Air Station New York	Brooklyn	New York	1971	Realigned as CGAS New York, closed 1999	
Naval Air Station Niagara Falls	Niagara	New York		Realigned to Air Force Reserve Command and the New York Air National Guard and realigned as Niagara Falls Air Reserve Station	
Naval Air Station Pasco	Pasco	Washington			
Naval Air Station Pu'unene	Pu'unene	Hawaii	1947		
Naval Air Station Norfolk	Norfolk	Virginia		Realigned as Naval Station Norfolk / Chambers Field	
Naval Air Station Oakland	Oakland	California			
Naval Air Station Olathe	Gardner	Kansas		Now New Century AirCenter	
Naval Air Station Quonset Point	North Kingstown	Rhode Island		Realigned as Quonset State Airport with Quonset Point ANGB of the Rhode Island Air National Guard and Quonset Point Army Aviation Support Facility	
Naval Air Station Richmond	Richmond West	Florida			
Naval Air Station Rockaway	Rockaway Beach	New York			
Naval Air Station Santa Ana	Tustin	California		Realigned as Marine Corps Air Station Tustin	
Naval Air Station St. Louis	St. Louis	Missouri		Rrealigned as Lambert/St. Louis ANGB, a tenant of St. Louis International Airport/Lambert Field	
Naval Air Station St. Simons	Brunswick	Georgia			
Naval Air Station Sand Point	Sand Point	Washington			
Naval Air Station Sanford	Sanford	Florida	1968	Now Orlando Sanford International Airport	
Naval Air Station Saufley Field	Pensacola	Florida		Realigned as Naval Outlying Landing Field Saufley and Naval Education and Training Program Development Center Saufley Field	
Naval Air Station South Weymouth	Weymouth	Massachusetts			
Naval Air Station Squantum	Quincy	Massachusetts			
Naval Air Station Tillamook	Tillamook	Oregon		Now Tillamook Airport	
Naval Air Station Twin Cities	Minneapolis	Minnesota		Realigned to the Air Force Reserve and Minnesota Air National Guard as Minneapolis-Saint Paul Joint Air Reserve Station with Naval Air Reserve Center (now Navy Operational Support Center) Twin Cities as tenant command	
Naval Air Station Vero Beach	Vero Beach	Florida		Now Vero Beach Municipal Airport	
Naval Air Station Weeksville	Elizabeth City	North Carolina			
Naval Air Station Wildwood	Rio Grande	New Jersey		Now Cape May Airport	
Naval Air Station Joint Reserve Base Willow Grove	Horsham Township	Pennsylvania		Realigned as Horsham Air Guard Station, later renamed Biddle Air National Guard Base	

=== Former overseas airfields ===
Former US Navy airfields located overseas
Installation name	Location	Country	Host installation	Closed	Notes	Ref.
Naval Air Station Aber Wrac'h	Aber Wrac'h	France		1918		
Naval Air Station Agana	Agana	Guam				
Naval Air Station Arcachon	Arcachon	France		1918		
Naval Air Station Argentia	Argentia	Dominion of Newfoundland	Naval Station Argentia	1994		
Naval Air Station and Naval Operating Base Bermuda	Southampton Parish	Bermuda		1970		
Naval Air Station Bermuda	St. David's Island	Bermuda		1995	Former Kindley Air Force Base	
Naval Air Station Bolsena	Bolsena	Italy				
Naval Air Station Brest	Brest	France		1918		
Naval Air Station Berehaven	County Cork	Ireland		1918		
Naval Air Station Coco Solo	Cativá	Panama				
Naval Air Station Cubi Point	Bataan	Philippines	Naval Base Subic Bay			
Naval Air Station Dunkirk	Dunkirk	France		1918		
Naval Air Station Eastleigh	Hampshire	United Kingdom		1918		
Naval Air Station Halifax	Nova Scotia	Canada		1918		
Naval Air Station Île-Tudy	Brittany	France		1918		
Naval Air Station Iwakuni	Yamaguchi Prefecture	Japan			Transferred to US Marine Corps and realigned as Marine Corps Air Station Iwakuni.	
Naval Air Facility Kadena	Okinawa Prefecture	Japan	Kadena Air Base			
Naval Air Station Keflavik	Keflavik	Iceland	Keflavik International Airport			
Naval Air Station Killingholme	Lincolnshire	United Kingdom	RNAS Killingholme	1918		
Naval Air Station Le Croisic	Le Croisic	France		1918		
Naval Air Station Lough Foyle	Lough Foyle	United Kingdom		1918		
Naval Air Station Midway	Midway Atoll	United States Minor Outlying Islands				
Naval Air Facility Mildenhall	Suffolk	United Kingdom	RAF Mildenhall			
Naval Air Station Moutchic	Lacanau	France		1918		
Naval Air Station Paimbœuf	Paimbœuf	France		1918		
Naval Air Station Pauillac	Pauillac	France		1918		
Naval Air Station Port Lyautey	Kenitra	Morocco				
Naval Air Station North Sydney	Nova Scotia	Canada		1918		
Naval Air Station Porto Corsini	Ravenna	Italy		1918		
Naval Air Station Queenstown	County Cork	Ireland		1918		
Naval Air Station Saint-Trojan	Saint-Trojan	France		1918		
Naval Air Station Sangley Point	Sangley Point	Philippines	Cavite Navy Yard	1971		
Naval Air Station Tréguier	Brittany	France		1918		
Naval Air Station Wexford	County Wexford	Ireland		1919		
Naval Air Station Whiddy Island	County Cork	Ireland		1918		
