= Naval outlying landing field =

Auxiliary airfield of the US military

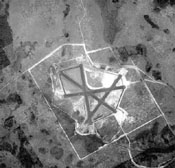
1940s aerial view of Outlying Landing Field Whitehouse in Florida

An outlying landing field (OLF) is a satellite airfield, associated with a seaborne component of the United States military. When associated with the United States Navy (who operate the majority), they are known as naval outlying landing fields (NOLFs) or naval auxiliary landing fields (NALFs); when associated with United States Marine Corps, they are known as Marine Corps outlying fields (MCOFs) or Marine Corps auxiliary landing fields (MCALFs).

== Usage ==
NOLFs were primarily built field carrier landing practice, and to also mitigate noise caused by louder aircraft from existing fields. Having no based units or aircraft, and minimal facilities, an outlying landing field is used as a low-traffic location for flight training, without the risks and distractions of other traffic at a naval air station or other airport.

However, the construction of a NOLF imposed various environmental issues, including bird/animal strike hazards (BASH), which can stress the bird population in the area. The Navy used various techniques to mitigate BASH, such as managing these hazards through the usage of radar detection and habitat management.

== List of active OLFs ==
=== NOLFs ===
Field name	FAA ID	Location	Associated air station
Barin	NBJ	Foley, Alabama	Whiting Field
Brewton	12J	Brewton, Alabama	Whiting Field
Cabaniss	NGW	Corpus Christi, Texas	Corpus Christi
Choctaw	NFJ	Milton, Florida	Whiting Field
Coupeville	NRA	Coupeville, Washington	Whidbey Island
Evergreen	GZH	Evergreen, Alabama	Whiting Field
Goliad	NGT	Berclair, Texas	Corpus Christi
Harold	NZX	Harold, Florida	Whiting Field
Holley	NKL	Navarre, Florida	Whiting Field
Imperial Beach	NRS	Imperial Beach, California	North Island
Pace	NVI	Wallace, Florida	Whiting Field
San Nicolas Island	NSI	San Nicolas Island, California	Point Mugu
Santa Rosa	NGS	Milton, Florida	Whiting Field
Saufley	NUN	Pensacola, Florida	Whiting Field
Site X	NSX	Jay, Florida	Whiting Field
Spencer	NRQ	Pace, Florida	Whiting Field
Summerdale	NFD	Summerdale, Alabama	Whiting Field
Waldron	NWL	Corpus Christi, Texas	Corpus Christi
Webster Field	NUI	St. Inigoes, Maryland	Patuxent River
Whitehouse	NEN	Jacksonville, Florida	Jacksonville
Williams	NJW	Meridian, Mississippi	Meridian

=== NALFs ===
Field name	FAA ID	Location	Associated air station
Fentress	NFE	Chesapeake, Virginia	Oceana
Orange Grove	NOG	Orange Grove, Texas	Kingsville
Sherman	NUC	San Clemente Island, California	North Island

=== MCALFS & MCOFs ===
Field name	FAA ID	Location	Associated air station
Atlantic	12NC	Atlantic, North Carolina	Cherry Point
Bogue	NJM	Swansboro, North Carolina	Cherry Point
Camp Davis	14NC	Holly Ridge, North Carolina	New River
Oak Grove	13NC	Pollocksville, North Carolina	Cherry Point

== See also ==
- Naval Outlying Landing Field North Carolina (proposed)
- Kingsville Naval Auxiliary Fields
