= List of joint-use airports in the United States =

The following is a list of civil/military joint-use airports in the United States. The list does not include former military airports that have been fully converted to civilian use.

Civil airport name	Military airport/facility name	City	State	IATA / ICAO / FAA	Notes
Albuquerque International Sunport	Kirtland Air Force Base	Albuquerque	New Mexico	ABQ / KABQ / ABQ	
Atlantic City International Airport	Atlantic City Air National Guard Base / Coast Guard Air Station Atlantic City	Egg Harbor Township	New Jersey	ACY / KACY / ACY	Civilian airport located on federal land leased to the South Jersey Transportation Authority
Alpena County Regional Airport	Alpena Combat Readiness Training Center	Alpena	Michigan	APN /KAPN / APN	Owned by the County Of Alpena; home of the Michigan National Guard's Combat Readiness Training Center
Savannah/Hilton Head International Airport	Savannah Air National Guard Base	Savannah	Georgia	SAV / KSAV / SAV	Georgia Air National Guard base located on city owned land
Charlotte Douglas International Airport	Charlotte Air National Guard Base	Charlotte	North Carolina	CLT / KCLT / CLT	North Carolina Air National Guard base located on city owned land
Quonset State Airport	Quonset Point Air National Guard Station	North Kingstown	Rhode Island	NCO / KOQU / OQU	Owned by Rhode Island Airport Corp.; home to the Rhode Island ANG's 143rd Airlift Wing and Army NG's 1st Battalion, 126th Aviation Regiment
Charleston International Airport	Charleston Air Force Base / Joint Base Charleston	North Charleston	South Carolina	CHS / KCHS / CHS	Jointly controlled between the United States Air Force and the Charleston County Aviation Authority
Hanscom Field	Hanscom Air Force Base	Bedford	Massachusetts	BED / KBED / BED	Operated by the Massachusetts Port Authority, with very few military flights
Destin–Fort Walton Beach Airport	Eglin Air Force Base	Valparaiso	Florida	VPS / KVPS / VPS	Civilian airport located on United States Air Force owned land
Schenectady County Airport	Stratton Air National Guard Base	Schenectady	New York	SCH / KSCH / SCH	New York Air National Guard
Mobile Regional Airport	Coast Guard Aviation Training Center / Army Aviation Support Facility #3	Mobile	Alabama	MOB / KMOB / MOB	United States Coast Guard and Alabama Army National Guard stations located on land owned by the Mobile Airport Authority
Montgomery Regional Airport	Montgomery Air National Guard Base / 131st Aviation Regiment (United States)	Montgomery	Alabama	MGM / KMGM / MGM	Alabama Air National Guard and Alabama Army National Guard base located on city owned land
Brewton Municipal Airport	NOLF Brewton	Brewton	Alabama	FAA LID: 12J	Owned by the City Brewton, AL; general aviation airport that serves as a Naval Outlying Landing Field for Naval Air Station Whiting Field
Middleton Field	NOLF Evergreen	Evergreen	Alabama	KGZH / GZH	Owned by the City Of Evergreen; general aviation airport that serves as a Naval Outlying Field for Naval Air Station Whiting Field.
Springfield–Beckley Municipal Airport	Springfield Air National Guard Base	Springfield	Ohio	SGH / KSGH / SGH	Ohio Air National Guard base located on city owned land
Sierra Vista Municipal Airport	Libby Army Airfield / Fort Huachuca	Sierra Vista	Arizona	FHU / KFHU / FHU	Civilian airport located on United States Army owned land
Astoria Regional Airport	Coast Guard Air Station Astoria	Warrenton	Oregon	AST / KAST / AST	United States Coast Guard air station located on Port of Astoria owned land
Hector International Airport	Fargo Air National Guard Base	Fargo	North Dakota	FAR / KFAR / FAR	
Miami-Opa Locka Executive Airport	Coast Guard Air Station Miami	Opa-locka	Florida	OPF / KOPF / OPF	Civilian airport located on Miami-Dade County owned land, United States Coast Guard air station located on federal land, shared runways
St. Pete–Clearwater International Airport	Coast Guard Air Station Clearwater / Army Aviation Support Facility (US Army Reserve)	Pinellas County, Florida	Florida	PIE / KPIE / PIE	Home of CGAS Clearwater and United States Army Reserve Aviation facility.
Cecil Airport	111th Aviation Regiment (Florida Army National Guard); US Coast Guard HITRON	Jacksonville	Florida	VQQ / KVQQ / VQQ	Public airport and spaceport owned by Jacksonville Aviation Authority. Home to the Florida ARNG’s 111th Aviation Regiment and the United States Coast Guard’s Helicopter Interdiction Tactical Squadron
Clinton National Airport	N/A	Little Rock	Arkansas	LIT / KLIT / LIT	Civilian airport used for training by units from Little Rock Air Force Base
Colorado Springs Airport	Peterson Space Force Base	Colorado Springs	Colorado	COS / KCOS / COS	United States Space Force base located on city owned land
Francis S. Gabreski Airport	Francis S. Gabreski Air National Guard Base	Westhampton Beach	New York	FOK / KFOK / FOK	New York Air National Guard base located on Suffolk County owned land
Abraham Lincoln Capital Airport	Capital Airport Air National Guard Station	Springfield	Illinois	SPI / KSPI / SPI	Leased from the Springfield Airport Authority. Home to the 183rd Wing, which is currently non-flying
Westfield-Barnes Regional Airport	Barnes Air National Guard Base	Westfield	Massachusetts	BAF / KBAF / BAF	Owned by the City of Westfield, home of the 104th fighter wing
Brooksville–Tampa Bay Regional Airport	Florida Army National Guard Army Aviation Support Facility No. 2	Brooksville	Florida	KBKV / BKV	Owned by Hernando County
Gulfport-Biloxi International Airport	Trent Lott National Guard Complex / Gulfport Combat Readiness Training Center (Mississippi National Guard)	Gulfport	Mississippi	GPT / KGPT / GPT	Located on land owned by the Gulfport–Biloxi Regional Airport Authority
Meridian Regional Airport	Key Field Air National Guard Base	Meridian	Mississippi	MEI /KMEI / MEI	Owned by Meridian Airport Authority. Key Field houses the 186th Air Refueling Wing and 111th Army Aviation Support Facility, Company B (Mississippi Army National Guard)
Hawkins Field	Army Aviation Support Facility #1 (AASF #1) (Mississippi Army National Guard)	Jackson	Mississippi	HKS / KHKS / HKS	General aviation airport by the city of Jackson, and operated by the Jackson Airport Authority. Home of MS ARNG's 1st Battalion, 185th Aviation Regiment, 185th Aviation Brigade
Hammond Northshore Regional Airport	Army Aviation Support Facility #1 (Louisiana Army National Guard)	Hammond	Louisiana	KHDC / HDC	Owned by the City Of Hammond; Home to LA ARNG’s 244th Aviation Regiment and the Louisiana Air National Guard’s 236th Combat Communications Squadron
Dane County Regional Airport	Truax Field Air National Guard Base	Madison	Wisconsin	MSN / KMSN / MSN	Owned by Dane County, home of multiple units
Richmond International Airport	Sandston Army National Guard Aviation Complex	Richmond	Virginia	RIC / KRIC / RIC	Virginia Army National Guard 224th Aviation Regiment Aviation Support Facility
Rosecrans Memorial Airport	Rosecrans Air National Guard Base	St. Joseph	Missouri	STJ / KSTJ / STJ	Home of the 139th Airlift Wing of the Missouri Air National Guard and the Advanced Airlift Tactics Training Center; owned and operated by the City of St. Joseph; tower operated under the FAA Contract Tower Program
Duluth International Airport	Duluth Air National Guard Base	Duluth	Minnesota	DLH / KDLH / DLH	Owned by the City of Duluth, home to the 148th Fighter Wing
Johnstown–Cambria County Airport	N/A	Johnstown	Pennsylvania	JST / KSJT / JST	Owned by Johnstown–Cambria County Airport Authority
Stockton Metropolitan Airport	California Army National Guard Army Aviation Support Facility	Stockton	California	SCK / KSCK / SCK	Owned by the County of San Joaquin, with military helicopter units
Stewart International Airport	Stewart Air National Guard Base	Town of Newburgh	New York	SWF / KSWF / SWF	New York Air National Guard base located on state owned land
Tucson International Airport	Morris Air National Guard Base	Tucson	Arizona	TUS / KTUS / TUS	Arizona Air National Guard base located on city owned land
Patrick Leahy Burlington International Airport	Burlington Air National Guard Base	South Burlington	Vermont	BTV / KBTV / BTV	
Fresno Yosemite International Airport	Fresno Air National Guard Base	Fresno	California	FAT / KFAT / FAT	California Air National Guard base located on city owned land
Portland International Airport	Portland Air National Guard Base	Portland	Oregon	PDX / KPDX / PDX	
Lincoln Airport	Lincoln Air National Guard Base	Lincoln	Nebraska	LNK / KLNK / LNK	
Milwaukee Mitchell International Airport	General Mitchell Air National Guard Base	Milwaukee	Wisconsin	MKE / KMKE / MKE	
Dover Civil Air Terminal	Dover Air Force Base	Dover	Delaware	DOV / KDOV / DOV	Joint-use agreement between the United States Air Force and the Delaware River and Bay Authority
Crater Lake–Klamath Regional Airport	Kingsley Field Air Guard Station	Kalmath Falls	Oregon	LMT / KMLT / LMY	Owned by the city of Kalmath Falls; home to the 173rd Fighter Wing of the Oregon Air National Guard
Elizabeth City Regional Airport	Coast Guard Air Station Elizabeth City	Elizabeth City	North Carolina	ECG / KECG / ECG	General aviation airport owned by the US Coast Guard; home to CGAS Elizabeth City
Jackson–Medgar Wiley Evers International Airport	Allen C. Thompson Field ANGB (Mississippi Air National Guard)	Jackson	Mississippi	JAN / KJAN / JAN	Home of the 172nd Airlift Wing. Located on land owned by the Jackson Municipal Airport Authority
Harrisburg International Airport	Harrisburg Air National Guard Base	Middletown	Pennsylvania	MDT / KMDT / MDT	Land owned by the Susquehanna Area Regional Airport Authority; home of the PA ANG's 193rd Special Operations Wing
Nashville International Airport	Joint Base Berry Field	Nashville	Tennessee	BNA / KBNA / BNA	
Phoenix Sky Harbor International Airport	Goldwater Air National Guard Base	Phoenix	Arizona	PHX/KPHX/PHX	Home to Arizona Air National Guard 161st Air Refueling Wing
Yuma International Airport	Marine Corps Air Station Yuma	Yuma	Arizona	YUM/KNYL/NYL	Home of MCAS Yuma. Owned by US Navy, and jointly operated by US Marine Corps and Yuma County Airport Authority
Gary/Chicago International Airport	Indiana Army National Guard	Gary	Indiana	GYY/KGYY/GYY	Home to Army Aviation Support Facility of the Indiana ARNG, on land owned by Chicago/Gary Regional Airport Authority
Pittsburgh International Airport	Pittsburgh IAP Air Reserve Station Pittsburgh Air National Guard Base	Pittsburgh	Pennsylvania	PIT/KPIT/PIT	Civilian airport owned by Allegheny County Airport Authority. The Air Reserve Station is home to the Air Force Reserve's 911th Airlift Wing & 758th Airlift Squadron. A separate base is home to Pennsylvania Air National Guard's 171st Air Refueling Wing.
Wichita Falls Regional Airport	Sheppard Air Force Base	Wichita Falls	Texas	SPS / KSPS / SPS	Joint-use facility where civilian operations share runways with the United States Air Force base

== See also ==
- Bucholz Army Airfield (U.S. Army Garrison Kwajalein Atoll), Kwajalein Atoll, Marshall Islands - United States Army airfield open to commercial civilian use
