= GZH =

GZH may refer to:

- Group psychotherapy
- Gulzarbagh railway station, Bihar, India
- Middleton Field, Alabama, United States
- GZH, Brazilian news site/portal resulting from a fusion of Zero Hora's and Rádio Gaúcha's portals
