= NBJ =

NBJ or nbj may refer to:

- NBJ, the IATA code for Dr. Antonio Agostinho Neto International Airport, Luanda, Angola
- NBJ, the FAA LID code for Naval Outlying Landing Field Barin, Foley, Alabama, United States
- nbj, the ISO 639-3 code for Ngarinyman language, Northern Territory, Australia
