= Naval Outlying Landing Field Wolf =

Closed military airport in Alabama

NOLF Wolf Field
- Baldwin County, Alabama in United States of America
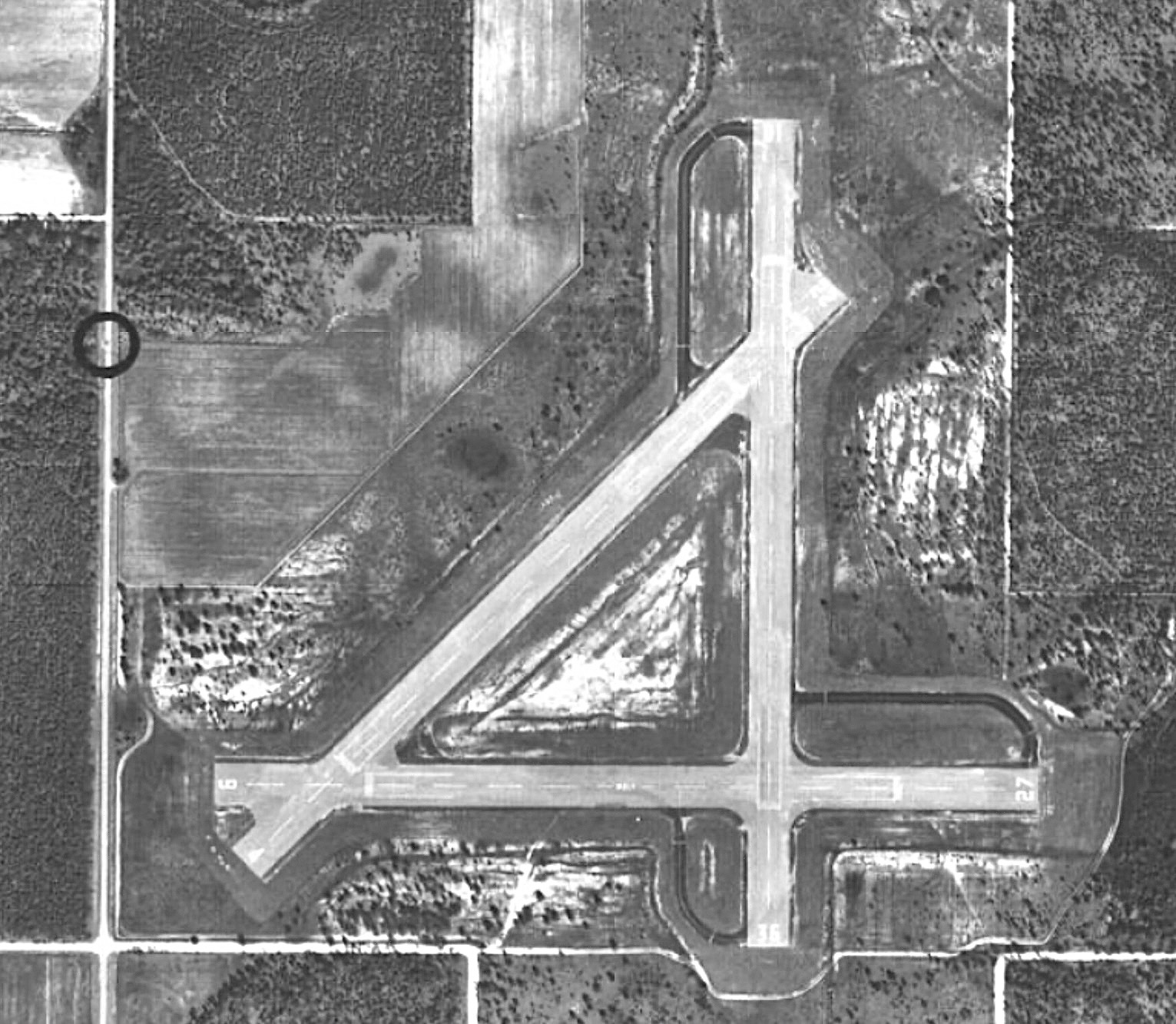
- Aerial photograph of NOLF Wolf in 1966.

Site information
- Type: Naval Outlying Landing Field
- Owner: US Government
- Operator: United States Navy
- Condition: Demolished

Location
- Location in Alabama NOLF Wolf (the United States)
- Coordinates: 30°20′43″N 87°37′27″W
- Area: 1.708 km²

Site history
- Built: 1942
- Built for: Navy flight training
- In use: 1942 - 2012

Airfield information
- Identifiers: ICAO: KNHL
Runways
Direction	Length and surface
18/36	914.4 metres (3,000 ft) Asphalt
9/27	914.4 metres (3,000 ft) Asphalt
4/22	914.4 metres (3,000 ft) Asphalt

Naval Outlying Landing Field Wolf, or Wolf Field (ICAO: KNHL), was a military airport in Baldwin County, Alabama, United States. It was built between 1942-44 by the United States Navy, and operated as a satellite field to NAS Pensacola for most of its lifetime. It was closed around 2012.

== History ==
NOLF Wolf was built between 1942-44 by the United States Navy. It was a part of a larger system of Second World War-era satellite airfields operated by Naval Air Station (NAS) Pensacola. It was designated as Field 27016, primarily operating as an auxiliary airfield with three 3,000 feet long asphalt runways and no hangars. It remained under the ownership of the US Government, and was operated by the Navy. The airfield was first depicted on a January 1944 Mobile Sectional Chart. By 1951, there were no buildings associated with the airfield. Throughout the decades, NOLF Wolf did not receive any upgrades and its runways remained the same length.

In 2002, the area was cleared and the runway was repainted. Beechcraft T-34 Mentor pilots occasionally used the airfield for Low Altitude Power Loss training exercises. It was kept in working order, but not used very often. By 2006, an operations shack existed on the site of the airfield. On the midpoint of runway 9/29, “WOLF” lettering was painted. Due to the usage of firefighting foam, the site became the subject to PFAF (per- and polyfluoroalkyl substances) investigations.

In 2009, the Department of the Navy proposed the extension of runways 18/35 and 4/22 in order to accommodate the Navy’s new T-6B Texan IIs for safer operations. This would involve the filling of approximately 3.9 acres of wetlands, the purchase of 202 acres of land or development rights, and nine acres of fee property. However, this plan was not continued due to potential conflicts with restricted airspace for NAS Pensacola and its east-west runway operations.

=== Operations ===
During unmanned operations, aircraft could only perform low pattern exercises (1,200 feet MSL and below), and arrive and depart via North and East of the field. This was done in order to reduce interference with air traffic control vectors or propeller aircraft on approach to NAS Pensacola. Low approach was also limited to a single aircraft each. When a Runway Duty Office and crash crew is present, NOLF Wolf could not be used for Precautionary Practice Emergency Landing exercises, as it would conflict with radar and flight paths from nearby Sherman Field.

=== Closure ===
In 2009, the Department of the Navy went forward with the plan to extend the runway of NAS Whiting Field. Only NOLFs Barin, Brewton, Choctaw, Evergreen, and Summerdale were selected to accommodate T-6B training operations due to their longer runways. NOLF Wolf was not among those considered, due to its short runways, making it unsuitable for newer aircraft. A US Navy study also looked at the environmental impacts of any expansion on local wildlife, Baldwin county's plans for development in the area, and conflicts training flights could cause not only to the locals in the area but also to the expanding air traffic from Pensacola International Airport, NAS Pensacola, and Jack Edwards Airport. By 2012, NOLF Wolf was closed and was subsequently marked with large yellow Xs onto its runways as indicated on Google Earth imagery. Today, NOLF Wolf remains abandoned and undeveloped.

In 2021, the government leased 44.5 acres of the former NOLF Wolf land to be used for agricultural purposes, specifically hay crop farming. This served as a time-limited opportunity for hay farmers.

== Layout ==
NOLF Wolf consisted of three operational runways, 18/36, 9/27, and 4/22, all approximately 3,000 ft long and 150 ft wide. The total Navy land was 422 acres. All of its runways did not have lighting available. NOLF Wolf’s navigational aids included a Tactical Air Navigation (TACAN), an NPA TACAN, and the frequency was Channel 119X. These were used to determine the Pensacola Class C airspace airspace boundary, which was situated very close to the airfield.

== Incidents & accidents ==
- On 7 October, 1952, a US Navy training aircraft assigned to Basic Training Unit 1C at NAS Whiting Field crashed at NOLF Wolf due to pilot error.
- On 12 August, 1953, an SNJ-5B modified with two 30mm machine guns and a bomb rank mounted below each wing assigned to Basic Training Unit 3 at NAAS Barin crashed after a mid-air collision over NOLF Wolf Field. The pilot bailed out prior to the impact.
- On 6 July, 1954, a US Navy training aircraft assigned to Basic Training Unit 1C at NAAS Corry Field was substantially damaged during a landing at NOLF Wolf.
- On 29 October 1954, a US Navy training aircraft was substantially damaged following heavy landing at NOLF Wolf.
- On 4 January, 1982, a US Navy training aircraft assigned to Training Squadron VT-6 crashed during touch-and-go landing exercises at NOLF Wolf.
