= Naval Outlying Landing Field Holley =

- IATA: none; ICAO: KNKL; FAA LID: NKL

Summary
- Airport type: Military
- Owner/Operator: U.S. Navy / Gulf Power
- Location: Navarre, Florida
- Time zone: CST (UTC -6:00)
- Elevation AMSL: 39 ft / 12 m
- Coordinates: 30°25′51″N 086°53′59″W

Map
- Location of Holley NOLF in Florida

Runways
Direction	Length		Surface
Direction	ft	m	Surface
17/35	3,600	1,097	Asphalt
09/27	3,600	1,097	Asphalt

Naval Outlying Landing Field (NOLF) Holley was a naval outlying landing field of the larger Naval Air Station Whiting Field located within the community of Navarre, Florida. The two runways were each 3,600 feet (1,100 meters) long. The runways were restricted to limited military use only; however, in 2017, the Gulf Power company was authorized to build a solar power plant on the facility grounds. The plant now provides power for some 18,000 homes, making it one of the largest solar fields in the region. The solar panels completely cover what were once the runways.

== See also ==
- Naval Air Station Pensacola
- Santa Rosa County
