= Naval Outlying Landing Field Silverhill =

NOLF Silverhill Field
- Baldwin County, Alabama in United States of America
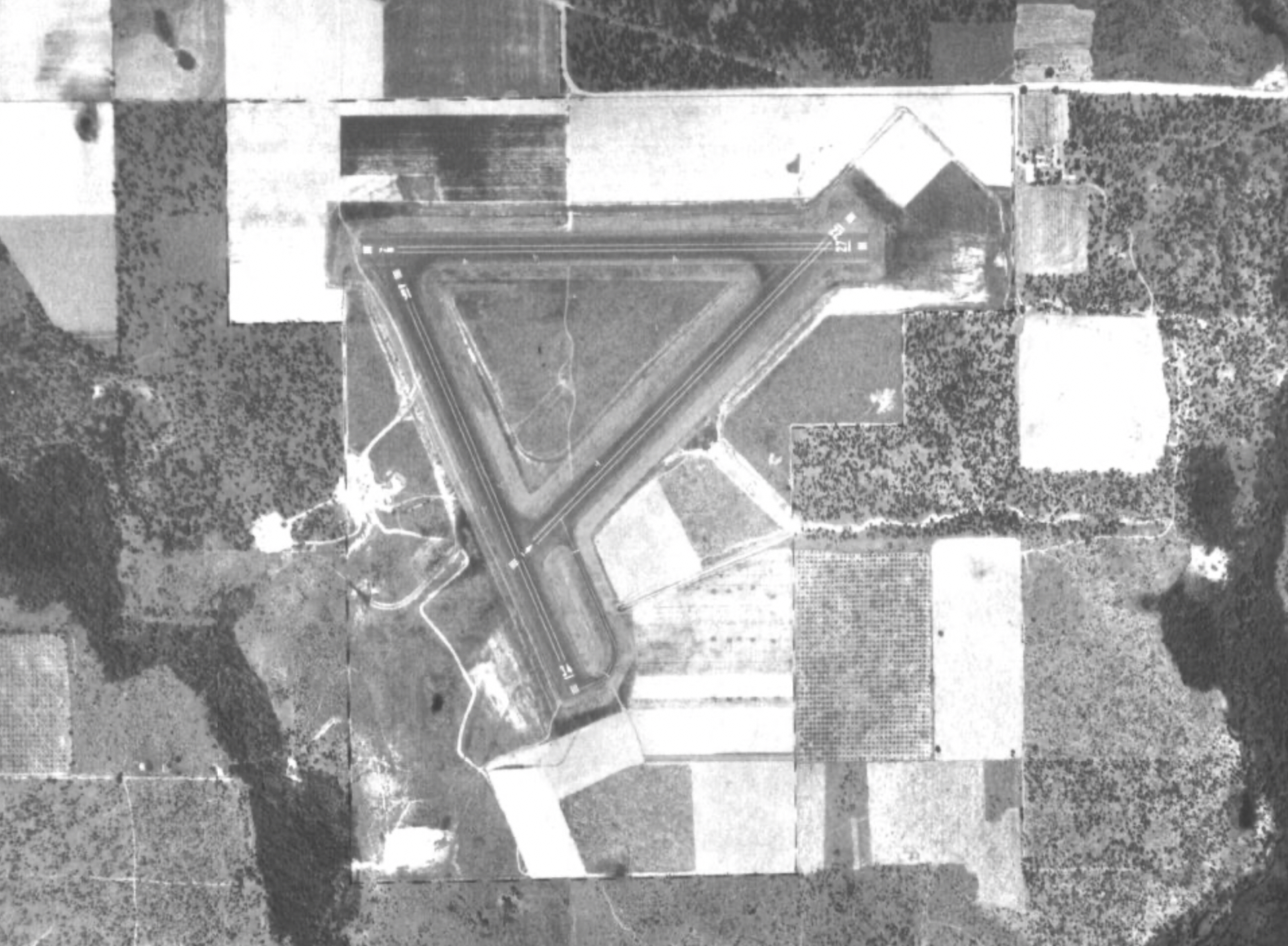
- Aerial photograph of NOLF Silverhill in 1952.

Site information
- Type: Naval Outlying Landing Field
- Owner: US Government
- Operator: United States Navy
- Condition: Abandoned

Location
- Location in Alabama NOLF Silverhill (the United States)
- Coordinates: 30°33′53″N 87°48′32″W

Site history
- Built: 1944
- Built for: Navy flight training
- In use: 1944 - 2012
- Fate: Disused

Airfield information
- Identifiers: ICAO: KNQB
Runways
| Direction | Length and surface |
|---|---|
| 16/34 | 960 metres (3,150 ft) Asphalt |
| 9/27 | 960 metres (3,150 ft) Asphalt |
| 5/23 | 960 metres (3,150 ft) Asphalt |

Naval Outlying Landing Field Silverhill, or Silverhill Field (ICAO: KNQB), was an unmanned military airport in Baldwin County, Alabama, United States. NOLF Silverhill was established in 1944 and was primarily used for training operations of the Navy. It was closed in 2012 when it was unable to accommodate the Navy's newer Beechcraft T-6 Texan IIs.

== History ==
NOLF Silverhill was established around 1944 by the United States Navy. It served as one of a network of Second World War satellite fields used by Naval Air Station (NAS) Pensacola for training purposes. It was first depicted on a January 1944 Mobile Sectional Chart. It was assigned as Field 29436. As with many other Naval Outlying Landing Fields, NOLF Silverhill was owned by the US Government and operated by the Navy. It did not have any hangars. It was equipped with three 2,969 feet long bituminous runways and a taxiway. By 1952, the runways were surfaced with asphalt. In 1964, NOLF Silverhill was used for Intensive Student Pilot Training. The airfield saw lots of activity during the 1960s, and it had a fire station and operations shack. Fire trucks would be left at night unattended. However, by 1972, activity had lessened. Eventually, NOLF Silverhill was closed by 1980. However, it was reopened afterwards with the Navy's T-34C Turbo Mentors using the airfield. It had three 3,150 feet long asphalt runways.

NOLF Silverhill had a Runway Duty Officer from Wing 6 at NAS Sherman. The airfield would be used by both Whiting & Sherman T-34s for the bounce pattern. The Navy also planned to conduct training at the airfield with its new Beechcraft T-6 Texan IIs, which would replace the T-34. However, this in turn would require the runways at NOLF Silverhill to lengthen in order to meet the requirements.

In 2009, the Department of the Navy proposed the extension of runways 16/34, 9/27, and 5/23. This would require the removal of several structures, purchase of 307 acres of land or development, and the purchase of 43 acres of fee property. This would also require 0.3 acres of wetlands to be filled. However, the plan never went forward. In 2009, the Department of the Navy went forward with the plan to extend the runway of NAS Whiting Field. Only NOLFs Barin, Brewton, Choctaw, Evergreen, and Summerdale were selected to accommodate T-6B training operations due to their longer runways. NOLF Silverhill was not among those considered, due to its short runways, making it unsuitable for newer aircraft. Due to the usage of firefighting foam, the site became the subject to PFAF (per- and polyfluoroalkyl substances) investigations. Subsequently, water sampling was done near the site of NOLF Silverhill. By June 2010, NOLF Silverhill was under NAS Whiting and was actively used and maintained. It had "Silverhill" lettering emblazoned on the midpoint of Runway 9/27.

=== Operations ===
NOLF Silverhill's radio frequency wqs 345.2 UHF/CH 10. The standard pattern altitude was 900 feet MSL, with the break altitude set at 1,200 feet MSL, and the delta pattern altitude established at 1,400 feet MSL. The airfield operated 3 runways which had no lighting, and there was a taxiway that was used for RDO parking. It was authorized for day only operations, and dual instruction flights were only allowed. Training included touch-and-go landing and emergency landing pattern maneuvers. These patterns were only limited to six aircraft.

=== Closure ===
Between 2012 and 2013, NOLF Silverhill was closed for use. Yellow Xs were marked on the runway to indicate its closure.

In 2016, the US federal government considered NOLF Silverhill, as one of two possible locations to house up to 2,000 unaccompanied migrant children who entered the US illegally. The Department of Health and Human Services planned to inspect the site, as well as another airfield near Orange Beach, as potential resettlement locations. On 18 July 2023, the Navy allowed Baldwin County Sheriff's Office to conduct Emergency Vehicle Operations Course training over unused taxiways and runways at NOLF Silverhill. Vehicle operations on the airfield required a high-intensity flashing light so they could easily be seen by any aircraft.

== Accidents & incidents ==
- On 16 October 1953, a US Navy training aircraft assigned to Basic Training Unit 4 at NAAS Corry Field, was substantially damaged in an accident at NOLF Silverhill due to pilot error.
- On 25 November 1953, a US Navy training aircraft assigned to Basic Training Unit 1C at NAAS Corry Field, was substantially damaged when it nosed over during landing at NOLF Silverhill. This was also the same aircraft that later crashed on 17 May 1978 due to it entering a spin after the pilot engaged in unwarranted low-altitude aerobatics, killing both occupants and destroying the aircraft.
- On 29 October 1954, a US Navy training aircraft assigned to Basic Training Unit 1C at NAAS Corry Field, was substantially damaged during landing at NOLF Silverhill. This was due to a ground loop.
- On 7 March 1955, a US Navy training aircraft assigned to Basic Training Unit 1C in NAAS Corry Field, was severely damaged during landing at NOLF Silverhill. This was also due to a ground loop.
