= Naval Air Station Whiting Field – North =

Coordinates: 30°43′27″N 087°01′19″W

NAS Whiting Field - North
- IATA: NSE; ICAO: KNSE; FAA LID: NSE

Summary
- Airport type: Military: Naval Air Station
- Operator: United States Navy
- Location: Santa Rosa County, near Milton, Florida
- Elevation AMSL: 199 ft / 61 m
- Website: wwwcfs.cnet.navy.mil/...
- Interactive map of NAS Whiting Field - North

Runways
Direction	Length		Surface
Direction	ft	m	Surface
5/23	6,000	1,829	Asphalt
14/32	6,000	1,829	Asphalt
- Sources: FAA master record, diagram

NAS Whiting Field - North (IATA: NSE, ICAO: KNSE), also known as North Whiting Field, is located four miles (6 km) north of the central business district of Milton, a city in Santa Rosa County, Florida, United States. It is one of two airfields located at Naval Air Station Whiting Field, the other airfield being NAS Whiting Field - South. VT-2, VT-3, and VT-6 of Training Air Wing Five use North Field for Primary fixed-wing training in the Beechcraft T-6 Texan II.

== Facilities ==
Whiting Field NAS North has two asphalt paved runways:

- Runway 5/23: 6,000 x 200 ft (1,829 x 61 m)
- Runway 14/32: 6,000 x 200 ft (1,829 x 61 m)

== See also ==
- Naval Air Station Whiting Field
- NAS Whiting Field - South
- List of airports by IATA code: N
