= Harold, Florida =

- Unincorporated community and Census-designated place
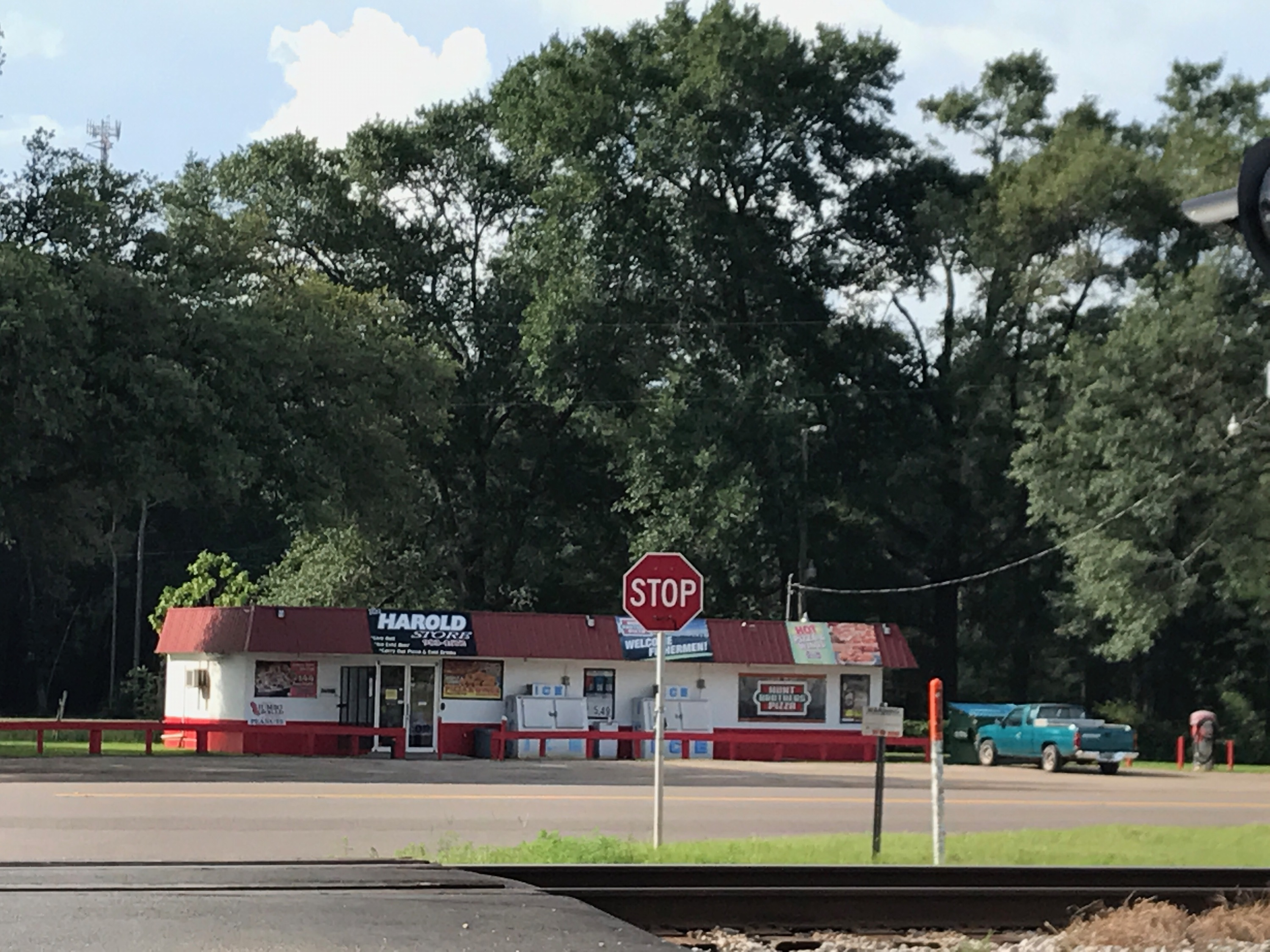
- The Harold Store in Harold, Florida.

- Location within Florida Location within the United States
- Coordinates: 30°40′25″N 86°51′20″W
- Country: United States
- State: Florida
- County: Santa Rosa

Area
  - Total: 14.729 sq mi (38.15 km^{2})
  - Land: 14.689 sq mi (38.04 km^{2})
  - Water: 0.040 sq mi (0.10 km^{2})
- Elevation: 157 ft (48 m)

Population (2020)
  - Total: 909
  - Density: 61.9/sq mi (23.9/km^{2})
- Time zone: UTC-6 (Central (CST))
  - Summer (DST): UTC-5 (CDT)
- Area code: 850
- GNIS feature ID: 2583351

Harold is an unincorporated community and census-designated place in Santa Rosa County, in the U.S. state of Florida. Its population was 909 at the 2020 census, up from 823 at the 2010 census. It is part of the Pensacola—Ferry Pass—Brent, Florida Metropolitan Statistical Area. A satellite field for Training Air Wing FIVE at Naval Air Station Whiting Field called OLF Harold is located here.

== History ==
Harold was originally known as Oscar. Oscar was first settled sometime around 1881, when its post office was established. Oscar's population increased upon the completion of the Pensacola and Atlanta Railroad in 1883. William D. Chipley purchased land for lumber in the early 1890s. It was around this time that the community became known as Harold.

A post office called Harold was established in 1909, and remained in operation until 1995. An early postmaster gave the community the name of his son. Another history behind the name involves Kansas congressman Ebenezer F. Porter, who purchased land for lumber in the area in the 1890s, renaming it for his son, Harold (1891-1962).

== Demographics ==
Harold first appeared as a census designated place in the 2010 U.S. census.
