= Naval Outlying Landing Field Coupeville =

Airport near Coupeville, Washington

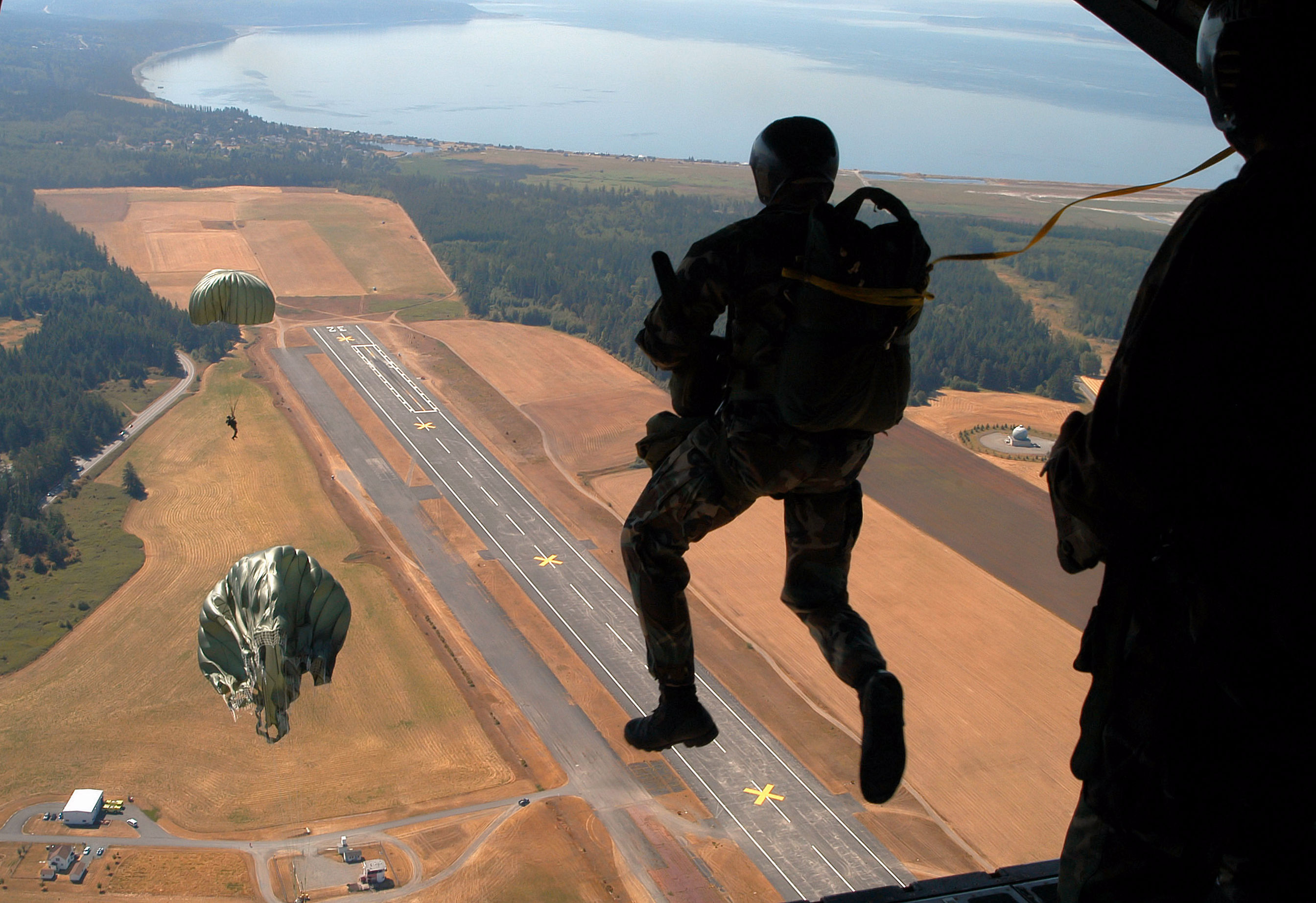
- Aerial view - NOLF Coupeville as seen from US Navy helicopter
- IATA: none; ICAO: KNRA; FAA LID: NRA

Summary
- Airport type: Military
- Operator: US Navy
- Location: Island County, near Coupeville, Washington
- Elevation AMSL: 199 ft / 61 m
- Coordinates: 48°11′00″N 122°38′00″W
- Interactive map of Naval Outlying Landing Field Coupeville

Runways
Direction	Length		Surface
Direction	ft	m	Surface
14/32	5,400	1,646	Concrete

Naval Outlying Landing Field Coupeville—or NOLF Coupeville—(ICAO: KNRA, FAA LID: NRA) is a military airport located two miles (3 km) southeast of Coupeville, Washington, in Island County. The airfield is owned and operated by the United States Navy. NOLF Coupeville nearly touches State Route 20 and is about 10 miles south of the Whidbey Island Naval Air Station.

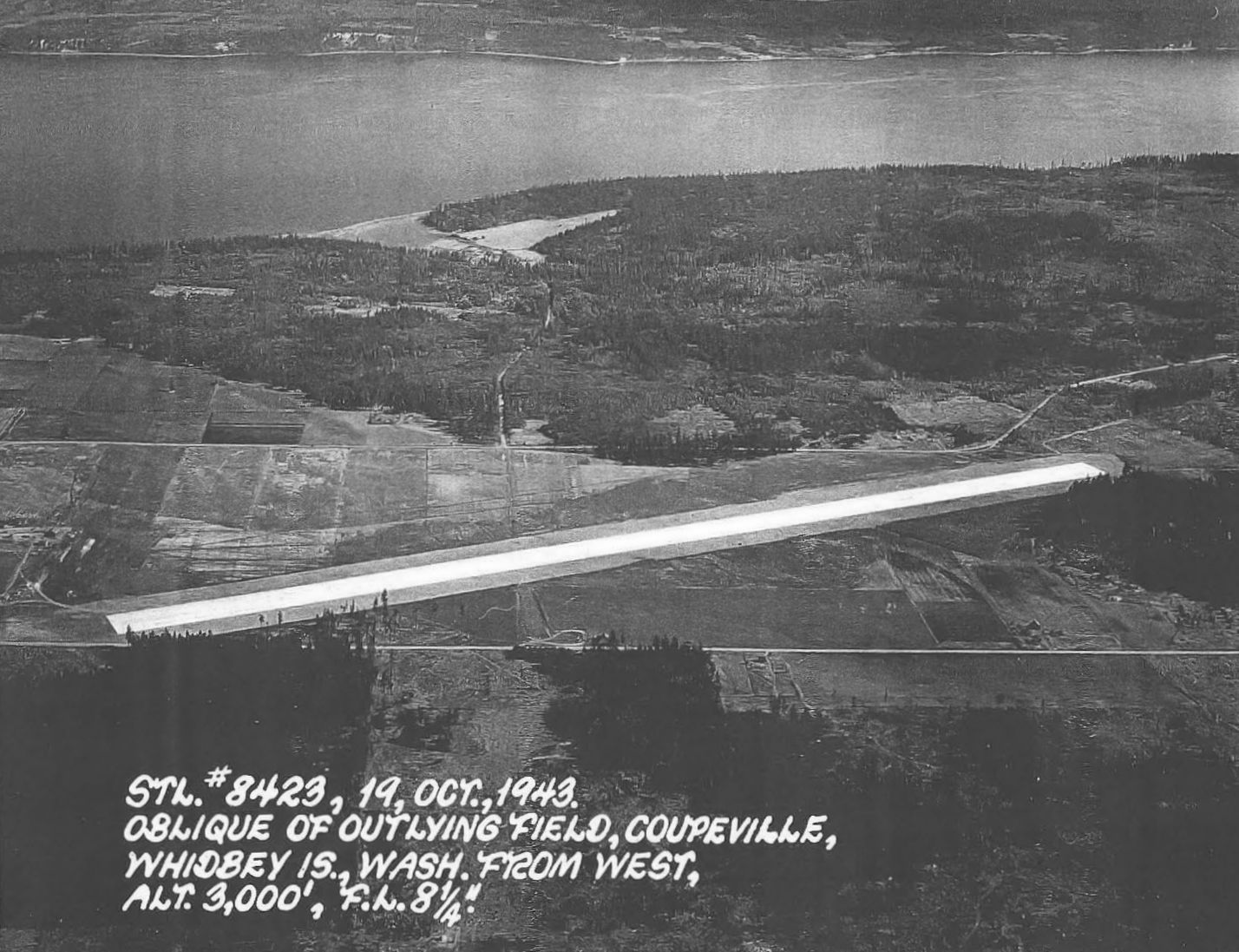
WWII-era aerial view of NOLF Coupeville - 1943

== History and usage ==
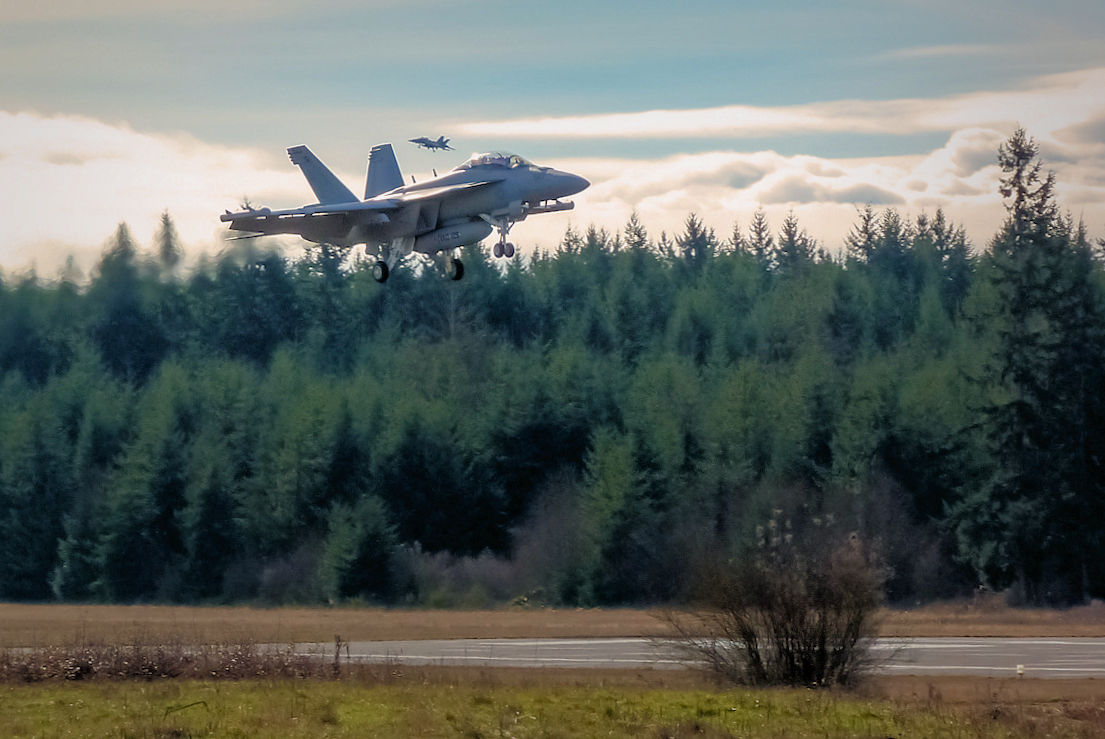
Boeing EA-18G Growler on approach at Naval Outlying Field Coupeville during FCLP touch-and-go carrier landing practice

NOLF Coupeville was commissioned for use by the US Navy in 1943. It currently supports day and night Field Carrier Landing Practice (FCLP) operations by the US Navy's EA-18G Growler. Prior to the EA-18G being the only tailhook aircraft stationed at NAS Whidbey, the EA-6B Prowler, A-6 Intruder and the A-3 Skywarrior were also supported for carrier landing practice out of the OLF.

Landing practice flight operations allow Naval Aviators and on-board crew to fly in patterns as well as practice touch-and-go landings, simulating carrier landings and take offs. During these practice runs, jet aircraft approach the runway and touch down where a simulated arrestor wire is painted on the deck. The jet then immediately takes off again and loops around the field to prepare for another landing and take off. Each aircraft makes multiple touch-and-go landings during these training events. While performing the touch and go maneuvers, the practicing aircraft fly at appropriate altitudes and speeds in addition to flying at or near sea level. OLF Coupeville is seen by the Navy as an ideal airfield for this type of carrier training due to its remote location and low ambient lighting, allowing pilots and crew to have the optimum experience for replication of landing aboard an aircraft carrier.

== Environmental concerns ==
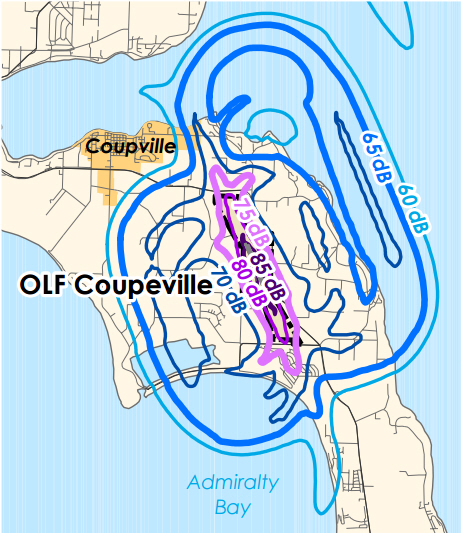
Map showing dB levels to areas surrounding NOLF Coupeville

Jet noise has been an on and off concern to residents living near the Navy jet training field. In July 2013, a local citizens' group filed a lawsuit asking for an Environmental Impact Study (EIS) examining EA-18G Growler flight operations at NOLF Coupeville and NAS Whidbey Island. By 2014, the Navy had initiated an ongoing EIS to, "Evaluate the potential environmental effects associated with ongoing and future Growler operations at NAS Whidbey Island’s Ault Field and Outlying Landing Field (OLF) Coupeville." In September 2013, the citizens' group placed the litigation on hold until the study was completed.

The study was completed in March 2019 and approved an increase in OLF Coupeville use to 12,000 Touch-and-go landings per year at OLF Coupeville from the previous 3,000+ and "an increase from approximately 90 hours (1 percent of total hours per year) to 360 hours (4 percent of total hours per year) in aircraft activity at OLF Coupeville." The decision received mixed community reviews. At least one citizens' group opposed to the flight operations has publicly pledged to keep protesting the OLF's use. The protests have grown to a point where one group - Citizens of Ebey's Reserve - initiated litigation in US Federal District Court, as did the Washington State Attorney General's Office separately concerned about National Historic Preservation Act, National Environmental Policy Act and Endangered Species Act compliance.
