= Naval Outlying Landing Field Spencer =

- IATA: none; ICAO: KNRQ; FAA LID: NRQ

Summary
- Airport type: Military
- Owner: US Navy
- Location: Santa Rosa County, near Pace, Florida
- Elevation AMSL: 151 ft (46 m)
- Coordinates: 30°37′30″N 87°08′23″W
- Interactive map of Naval Outlying Landing Field Spencer

Runways
Direction	Length		Surface
Direction	ft	m	Surface
4L/22R	1,801	549	Asphalt
4R/22L	1,801	549	Asphalt
9L/27R	1,801	549	Asphalt
9R/27L	1,801	549	Asphalt
13L/31R	1,801	549	Asphalt
13R/31L	1,801	549	Asphalt
18L/36R	1,801	549	Asphalt
18R/36L	1,801	549	Asphalt

Naval Outlying Landing Field Spencer (ICAO: KNRQ, FAA LID: NRQ) is a military airport located two miles (3 km) northeast of Pace, Florida, United States, in Santa Rosa County. It is owned by the United States Navy. NOLF Spencer is one mile north of U.S. Highway 90, 3.5 miles (6 km) west of the City of Milton, just over 6 miles (10 km) east of the Escambia River and about 7 miles (11 km) southwest of NAS Whiting Field.

This airfield is situated on 640 acres (259 ha) and has eight runways, all 1,800 feet (550 m) long by 200 feet (61 m) wide. These runways are arranged to make two squares, one whose vertices approximately point north, south, east and west, and another which lies directly on top but is rotated 45°.

Its mission is to support helicopter operations of the Naval Air Training Command, and it remains under the control of Commander, Training Air Wing FIVE at nearby NAS Whiting Field.

Although most U.S. airports use the same three-letter location identifier for the FAA and IATA, Naval Outlying Landing Field Spencer is assigned NRQ by the FAA but has no designation from the IATA.

== See also ==
- Naval outlying landing field
