= Naval Air Station Whiting Field – South =

NAS Whiting Field – South
- IATA: none; ICAO: KNDZ; FAA LID: NDZ

Summary
- Airport type: Military: Naval Air Station
- Operator: United States Navy
- Location: Santa Rosa County, near Milton, Florida
- Elevation AMSL: 177 ft / 54 m
- Coordinates: 30°42′16″N 087°01′23″W
- Website: www.cfs.cnet.navy.mil/...
- Interactive map of NAS Whiting Field – South

Runways
Direction	Length		Surface
Direction	ft	m	Surface
5/23	5,997	1,828	Asphalt
14/32	6,001	1,829	Asphalt

Helipads
Number	Length		Surface
Number	ft	m	Surface
H1	100	30	Asphalt
H2	100	30	Asphalt
H3	100	30	Asphalt
H4	100	30	Asphalt
H5	100	30	Asphalt
H6	75	23	Asphalt
H-A	100	30	Asphalt
H-B	100	30	Asphalt
H-C	100	30	Asphalt
H-D	100	30	Asphalt
H-E	100	30	Asphalt
H-F	100	30	Asphalt
- Source: Federal Aviation Administration

Naval Air Station Whiting Field – South (ICAO: KNDZ, FAA LID: NDZ), also known as South Whiting Field, is located three miles (5 km) north of the central business district of Milton, in Santa Rosa County, Florida, United States. This military airport is owned by the US Navy. It is one of two airfields located at Naval Air Station Whiting Field, the other airfield being NAS Whiting Field – North.

This airport is assigned a three-letter location identifier of NDZ by the Federal Aviation Administration, but it does not have an International Air Transport Association (IATA) airport code.

== Facilities ==
Whiting Field NAS-South has two runways and 12 helipads:

- Runway 5/23: 5,997 x 200 ft. (1,828 x 61 m), Surface: asphalt
- Runway 14/32: 6,001 x 200 ft. (1,829 x 61 m), Surface: asphalt
- Helipads H1, H2, H3, H4, H5: 100 x 100 ft. (30 x 30 m), Surface: asphalt
- Helipad H6: 75 x 100 ft. (23 x 30 m), Surface: asphalt
- Helipads H-A, B, C, D, E, F: 100 x 100 ft. (30 x 30 m), Surface: asphalt

== See also ==
- Naval Air Station Whiting Field
- NAS Whiting Field – North
