= Naval Outlying Landing Field San Nicolas Island =

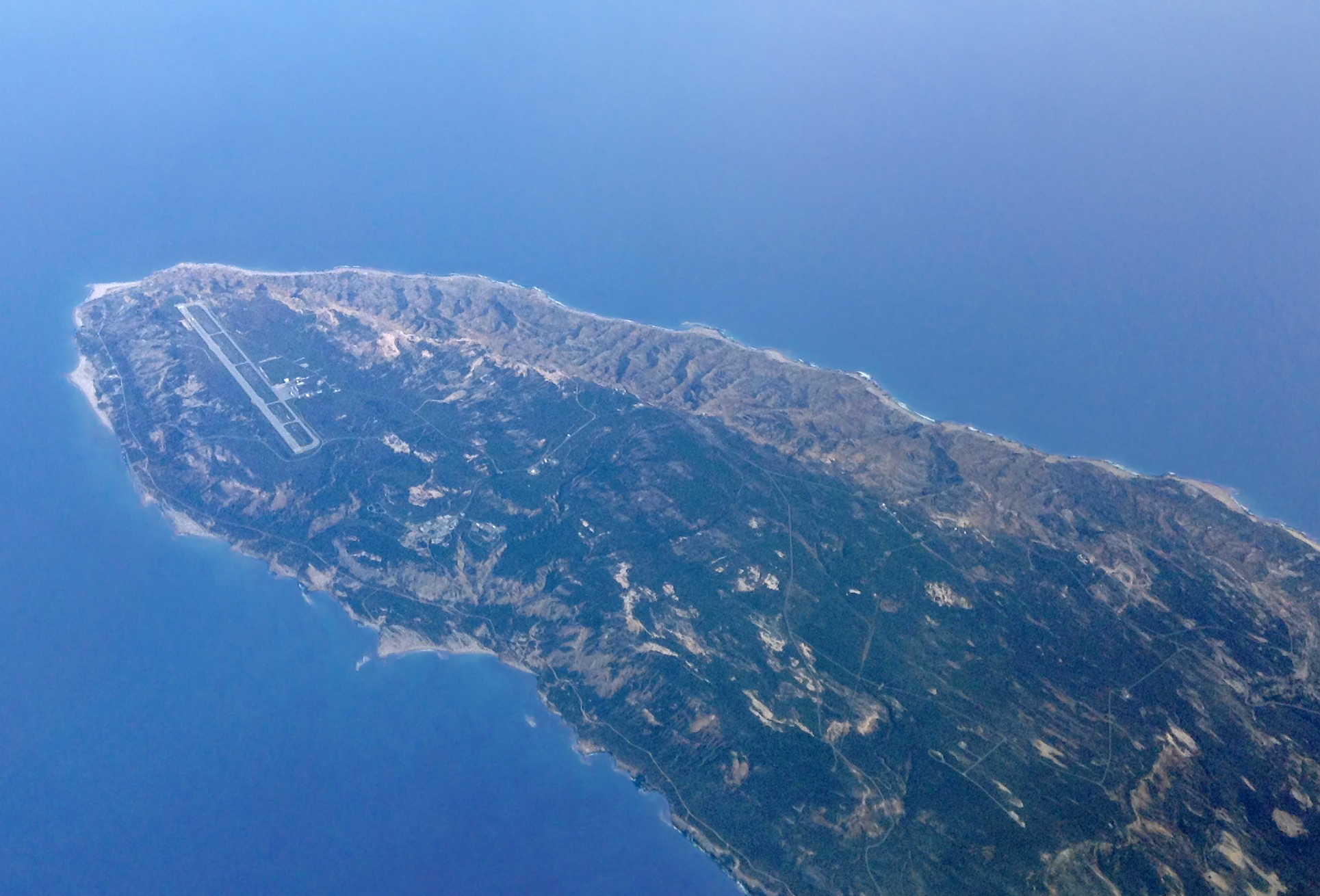
- IATA: none; ICAO: KNSI; FAA LID: NSI

Summary
- Airport type: Military
- Operator: US Navy
- Location: San Nicolas Island, Ventura County, California
- Elevation AMSL: 506 ft / 154.2 m
- Coordinates: 33°14′23″N 119°27′29″W
- Interactive map of Naval Outlying Landing Field San Nicolas Island

Runways
| Direction | Length | | Surface |
| Direction | ft | m | Surface |
|---|---|---|---|
| 12/30 | 10,002 | 3,049 | PEM |

Naval Outlying Landing Field San Nicolas Island or NOLF San Nicolas Island (ICAO: KNSI, FAA LID: NSI) is a military airport located on San Nicolas Island, in Ventura County, California, United States. The airport is administered by Naval Base Ventura County and is one of several Naval Outlying Landing Fields operated by the US Navy.

External image
- San Nicolas from the airfield approach

The airport's ICAO identifier is KNSI. Although most U.S. airports and airbases use the same three-letter location identifier for the FAA and IATA, NOLF San Nicolas Island is assigned NSI by the FAA, and the IATA has assigned NSI to Nsimalen International Airport in Yaoundé, Cameroon.

US Navy took over the Landing Field in January 1933 from the Civil Aeronautics Authority. Civil Aeronautics Authority built the two airstrips in the 1930s as two emergency dirt landing strips.
