= Naval Outlying Landing Field Summerdale =

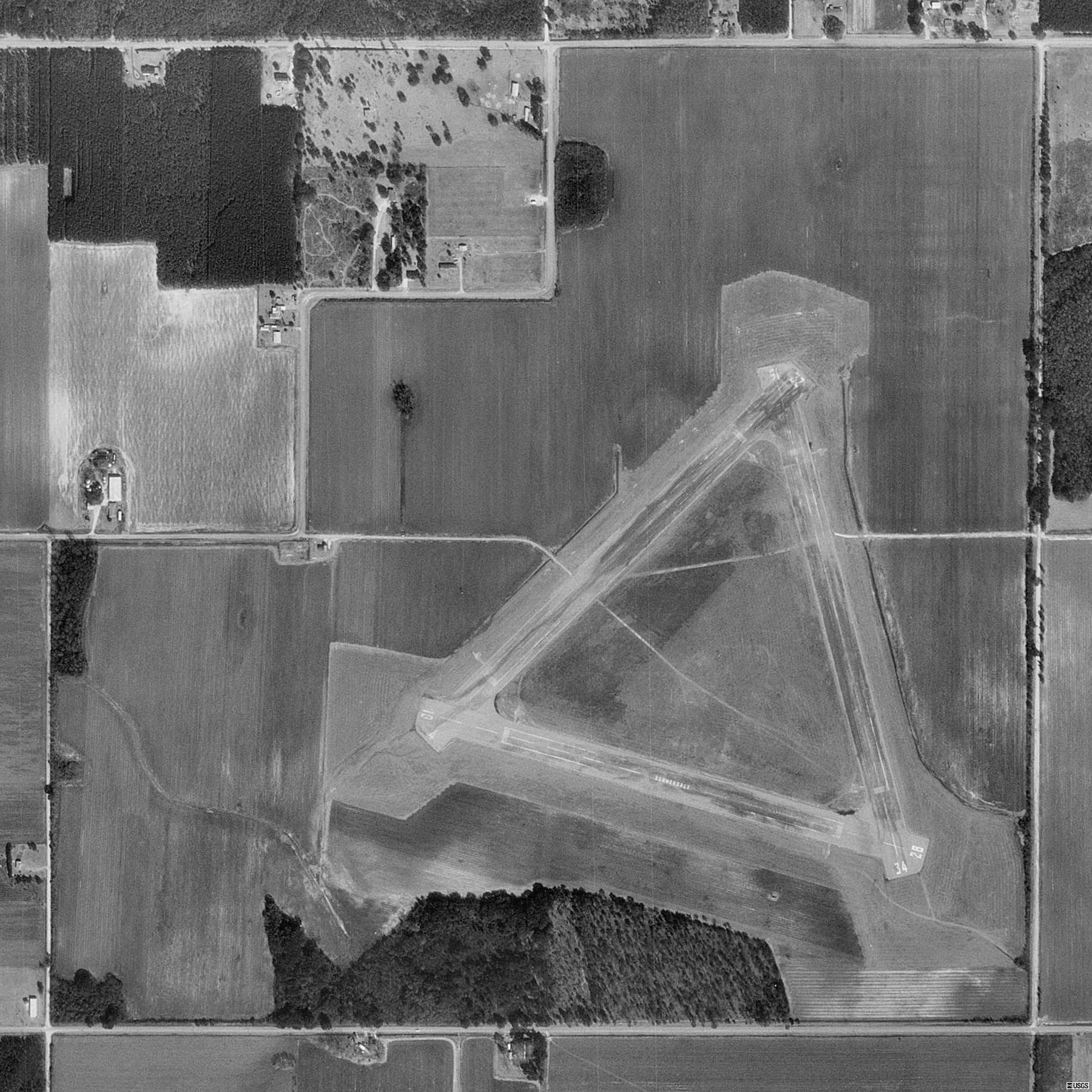
- USGS aerial image - 17 February 1997
- IATA: none; ICAO: KNFD; FAA LID: NFD

Summary
- Airport type: Military
- Owner: U.S. Navy
- Location: Baldwin County, near Summerdale, Alabama
- Elevation AMSL: 149 ft (45 m)
- Coordinates: 30°30′28″N 087°38′44″W
- Interactive map of Naval Outlying Landing Field Summerdale

Runways
Direction	Length		Surface
Direction	ft	m	Surface
5/23	3,998	1,219	Asphalt
11/29	4,000	1,219	Asphalt
- Source: Federal Aviation Administration

Naval Outlying Landing Field Summerdale (ICAO: KNFD, FAA LID: NFD) is an uncontrolled military use airport located in Summerdale, a town in Baldwin County, Alabama, United States. It is under the operational control of NAS Whiting Field and is used for flying training.

Although many U.S. airports use the same three-letter location identifier for the Federal Aviation Administration and IATA, this airport is assigned NFD by the FAA but has no designation from the IATA.

== Facilities ==
Naval Outlying Landing Field Summerdale has two asphalt paved runways: Runway 5/23 measuring 3,998 by 150 feet (1,219 x 46 m) and Runway 11/29 measuring 4,000 feet by 150 feet (1,219 x 46 m). In 2010, officials from NAS Whiting Field announced plans to expand the runways for several NOLFs they operate (including NOLF Summerdale) to facilitate the use of the T-6 Texan II training aircraft, which was slated to replace the aging fleet of T-34C Turbomentors. Those plans came under heavy opposition by some residents who were worried about losing homes and land in the process.

NOLF Summerdale's flying activities were reduced for refurbishment, including the closure of one runway and the lengthening of the two other runways. It then "reopened" in March 2016 to resume its role as an outlying practice field for training flights by T-6B Texan II aircraft originating from NAS Whiting Field.
