= Naval Outlying Landing Field Choctaw =

Military facility in Florida, US

Naval Outlying Landing Field Choctaw Eglin Dillon Airdrome Eglin Air Force Auxiliary Field #10
- Part of Eglin Air Force Base
- Located near: Pensacola, Florida
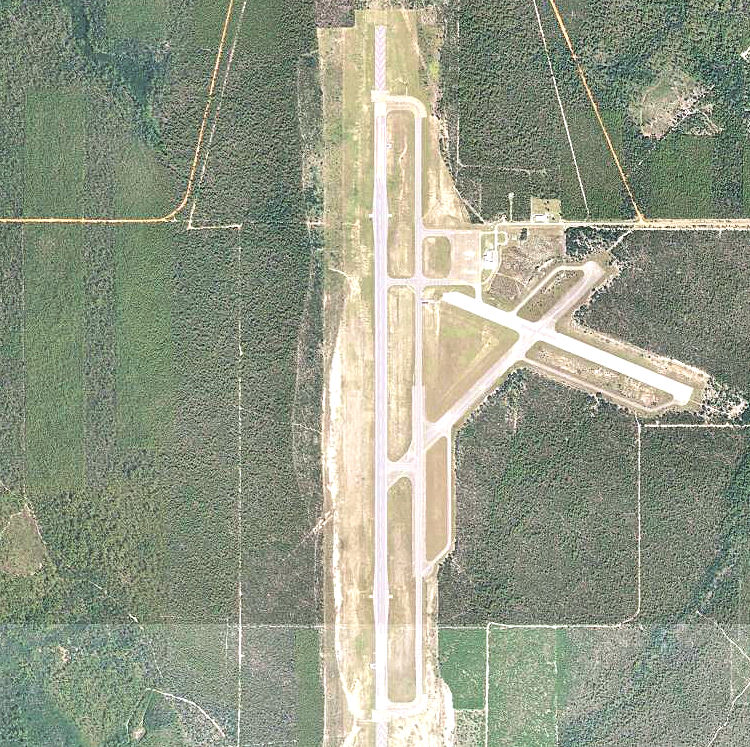
- 2006 USGS airphoto

Site information
- Type: Military airfield

Location
- Coordinates: 30°30′33″N 086°57′28″W

Site history
- Battles/wars: World War II

Airfield information
- Identifiers: IATA: NFJ, ICAO: KNFJ, FAA LID: NFJ, WMO: 725540
- Elevation: 31 metres (102 ft) AMSL
Runways
Direction	Length and surface
18/36	2,438 metres (7,999 ft) Asphalt

Naval Outlying Landing Field Choctaw (IATA: NFJ, ICAO: KNFJ, FAA LID: NFJ) is the United States Navy's designation for an auxiliary airfield that was originally constructed during World War II as Eglin Field (now Eglin Air Force Base) Auxiliary Field # 10. It is located 16.6 miles northeast of Pensacola, Florida.

== History ==
Constructed in Santa Rosa County, the westernmost of Eglin's ten satellite fields, Auxiliary Field 10 was originally named Dillon Field for Captain Barclay H. Dillon, United States Army Air Forces, a test pilot of the Fighter Section of the 1st Proving Ground Group, Eglin Field, killed 2 October 1943 when his P-38J-5-LO Lightning, AAF Ser. No. 42-67103, crashed 8 miles W of Milton, Florida. Field 10 was later named Eglin Dillon Airdrome.

The field was constructed in 1942 by the U.S. Army Air Forces as part of the Eglin Field military reservation. It initially consisted of three 4000' asphalt runways in an "A" type configuration. Runway 18/36 is now 8000' long with 1000' of overhang on each side and 150' wide. No ground station was constructed. It was transferred to the United States Navy in 1943 as NAF 05822 and was designated an Outlying Field for Naval Air Station Whiting Field. Now principally used for U.S. Navy primary flight training, the Navy refers to it as Outlying Landing Field Choctaw (OLF), a satellite field for Training Air Wing Six at Naval Air Station Pensacola and Training Air Wing Five at Naval Air Station Whiting Field.

It is also used for unmanned aerial vehicle (UAV) training by the U.S. Air Force.

It is expected that Air Force, Navy and Marine Corps F-35 Lightning IIs assigned to the 33d Fighter Wing at Eglin Air Force Base will utilize OLF Choctaw for training.

== See also ==
- Florida World War II Army Airfields
