= Wallace, Florida =

- Unincorporated community
- Location within Florida Location within the United States
- Coordinates: 30°40′39″N 87°10′48″W
- Country: United States
- State: Florida
- County: Santa Rosa

Area
  - Total: 11.751 sq mi (30.43 km^{2})
  - Land: 11.716 sq mi (30.34 km^{2})
  - Water: 0.035 sq mi (0.091 km^{2})
- Elevation: 180 ft (55 m)

Population (2020)
  - Total: 3,868
  - Density: 330.1/sq mi (127.5/km^{2})
- Time zone: UTC-6 (Central (CST))
  - Summer (DST): UTC-5 (CDT)
- ZIP code: 32571
- Area code: 850
- GNIS feature ID: 294964

Wallace is an unincorporated community and census-designated place in Santa Rosa County, Florida, United States. Its population was 3,868 at the 2020 census, and it is part of the Pensacola—Ferry Pass—Brent, Florida Metropolitan Statistical Area.

== Geography ==
According to the U.S. Census Bureau, the community has an area of 11.751 square miles (30.43 km^{2}); 11.716 square miles (30.34 km^{2}) of its area is land, and 0.035 square miles (0.091 km^{2}) is water.

== Demographics ==
Wallace first appeared as a census designated place in the 2010 U.S. census.

=== 2020 census ===
As of the 2020 census, Wallace had a population of 3,868. The median age was 41.0 years. 25.3% of residents were under the age of 18 and 16.1% of residents were 65 years of age or older. For every 100 females there were 101.7 males, and for every 100 females age 18 and over there were 99.3 males age 18 and over.

57.9% of residents lived in urban areas, while 42.1% lived in rural areas.

There were 1,362 households in Wallace, of which 40.1% had children under the age of 18 living in them. Of all households, 74.3% were married-couple households, 8.5% were households with a male householder and no spouse or partner present, and 14.0% were households with a female householder and no spouse or partner present. About 11.7% of all households were made up of individuals and 5.1% had someone living alone who was 65 years of age or older.

There were 1,415 housing units, of which 3.7% were vacant. The homeowner vacancy rate was 1.8% and the rental vacancy rate was 4.9%.

Racial composition as of the 2020 census
Race	Number	Percent
White	3,282	84.9%
Black or African American	128	3.3%
American Indian and Alaska Native	32	0.8%
Asian	57	1.5%
Native Hawaiian and Other Pacific Islander	5	0.1%
Some other race	54	1.4%
Two or more races	310	8.0%
Hispanic or Latino (of any race)	219	5.7%

=== 2010 census ===
As of the 2010 census, Wallace had a population of 1,785.
