= Naval Outlying Landing Field Santa Rosa =

Naval Outlying Field Santa Rosa
- IATA: none; ICAO: KNGS; FAA LID: NGS

Summary
- Airport type: Military
- Owner: U.S. Navy
- Location: Santa Rosa County, near Milton, Florida
- Elevation AMSL: 150 ft / 46 m
- Coordinates: 30°36′39″N 086°56′24″W
- Interactive map of Naval Outlying Field Santa Rosa

Runways
Direction	Length		Surface
Direction	ft	m	Surface
5/23	4,500	1,372	Asphalt
9/27	4,500	1,372	Asphalt
14/32	4,500	1,372	Asphalt
18/36	4,500	1,372	Asphalt
- Source: Federal Aviation Administration

Naval Outlying Landing Field (NOLF) Santa Rosa (ICAO: KNGS, FAA LID: NGS) is a military use airport located five nautical miles (9 km) southeast of the central business district of Milton, in Santa Rosa County, Florida, United States. It is owned by the United States Navy and has four asphalt paved runways (5/23, 9/27, 14/32, 18/36) all of which are 4,500 by 150 feet (1,372 x 46 m). The airfield is under the control of Commander, Training Air Wing FIVE at NAS Whiting Field, Florida.

This airport is assigned a three-letter location identifier of NGS by the Federal Aviation Administration, but it does not have an International Air Transport Association (IATA) airport code (the IATA assigned NGS to Nagasaki Airport in Japan).
