= Summerdale, Alabama =

- Town
- Seal
- Nickname: The Sunshine of Baldwin County
- Location of Summerdale in Baldwin County, Alabama.
- Coordinates: 30°29′20″N 87°41′59″W
- Country: United States
- State: Alabama
- County: Baldwin
- Incorporated: 1906

Area
  - Total: 10.17 sq mi (26.34 km^{2})
  - Land: 10.14 sq mi (26.25 km^{2})
  - Water: 0.035 sq mi (0.09 km^{2})
- Elevation: 102 ft (31 m)

Population (2020)
  - Total: 1,468
  - Density: 144.9/sq mi (55.93/km^{2})
- Time zone: UTC-6 (CST)
  - Summer (DST): UTC-5 (CDT)
- ZIP code: 36580
- Area code: 251
- FIPS code: 01-73872
- GNIS feature ID: 2406681
- Website: www.summerdalealabama.com

Summerdale is a rural town in south-central Baldwin County, Alabama, United States. It is the site of the Naval Outlying Landing Field Summerdale. At the 2020 census, the population was 1,468. It is part of the Daphne–Fairhope–Foley Metropolitan Statistical Area.

== Geography ==
Alabama State Route 59 passes along the west side of the town, leading north 5 miles (8 km) to Robertsdale and south 6 miles (10 km) to Foley.

According to the U.S. Census Bureau, the town has a total area of 9.7 square miles (25.2 km^{2}), of which 9.7 square miles (25.1 km^{2}) is land and 0.039 square miles (0.1 km^{2}), or 0.38%, is water.

== Demographics ==
Historical population
Census	Pop.	Note	%±
1930	267		—
1940	239		−10.5%
1950	489		104.6%
1960	533		9.0%
1970	550		3.2%
1980	546		−0.7%
1990	559		2.4%
2000	655		17.2%
2010	862		31.6%
2020	1,468		70.3%
U.S. Decennial Census; 2013 Estimate

=== 2020 census ===
As of the 2020 census, Summerdale had a population of 1,468. The median age was 40.0 years. 22.7% of residents were under the age of 18 and 18.3% of residents were 65 years of age or older. For every 100 females there were 95.7 males, and for every 100 females age 18 and over there were 90.8 males age 18 and over.

38.4% of residents lived in urban areas, while 61.6% lived in rural areas.

There were 583 households in Summerdale, of which 30.5% had children under the age of 18 living in them. Of all households, 53.5% were married-couple households, 14.4% were households with a male householder and no spouse or partner present, and 24.5% were households with a female householder and no spouse or partner present. About 21.3% of all households were made up of individuals and 9.6% had someone living alone who was 65 years of age or older.

There were 634 housing units, of which 8.0% were vacant. The homeowner vacancy rate was 2.8% and the rental vacancy rate was 14.4%.

Summerdale racial composition
Race	Num.	Perc.
White (non-Hispanic)	1,242	84.6%
Black or African American (non-Hispanic)	55	3.75%
Native American	4	0.27%
Asian	15	1.02%
Pacific Islander	1	0.07%
Other/Mixed	86	5.86%
Hispanic or Latino	65	4.43%

=== 2000 census ===
As of the census of 2000, there were 655 people, 255 households, and 184 families residing in the town. The population density was 125.7 inhabitants per square mile (48.5/km^{2}). There were 282 housing units at an average density of 54.1 per square mile (20.9/km^{2}). The racial makeup of the town was 90.23% White, 4.89% Black or African American, 1.07% Native American, 0.15% Asian, 0.92% from other races, and 2.75% from two or more races. Nearly 2.29% of the population were Hispanic or Latino of any race.

There were 255 households, out of which 34.1% had children under the age of 18 living with them, 56.5% were married couples living together, 10.6% had a female householder with no husband present, and 27.8% were non-families. 23.1% of all households were made up of individuals, and 8.2% had someone living alone who was 65 years of age or older. The average household size was 2.57, and the average family size was 3.04.

In the town, the population was spread out, with 27.6% under the age of 18, 11.5% from 18 to 24, 28.2% from 25 to 44, 21.7% from 45 to 64, and 11.0% who were 65 years of age or older. The median age was 32 years. For every 100 females, there were 104.0 males. For every 100 females age 18 and over, there were 97.5 males.

The median income for a household in the town was $27,917, and the median income for a family was $32,159. Males had a median income of $26,563 versus $19,167 for females. The per capita income for the town was $13,775. About 13.7% of families and 16.4% of the population were below the poverty line, including 28.3% of those under age 18 and 4.9% of those age 65 or over.

== Education ==
Summerdale is a part of the Baldwin County Public Schools system.

Summerdale has one public school, Summerdale School, which serves grades pre-K through 8. Students continue on to Elberta High School in nearby Elberta for grades 9 through 12. Snook Christian Academy is a private school located on the corner of County Roads 28 and 71. It serves grades Pre-K through 12.

== Naval Outlying Landing Field Summerdale ==
The Navy Outlying Landing Field (NOLF) Summerdale airport is on the east side of Summerdale (at latitude, longitude: 30.507695, –87.645541). The Airport Code is NFD, in region: ASO - Southern, with boundary ARTCC: ZJX - Jacksonville, and Tie-in FSS: ANB - Anniston. The airport runway length/width is 2850 x 150 ft (868.7 x 45.7 m), with runway elevation: 149 feet (45 m). The airport is owned/operated by the US Navy, through Commanding Officer, Operations Department, 7077 USS Lexington Court, Milton, FL 32570-6016.

== Library ==
The Summerdale Public Library is open Monday - Friday 9-6 and Saturday 9-1. It is conveniently located in the center of town where you can walk to it if you’d like. In addition to books, the library offers wifi, a notary, meeting space, children’s reading programs, and after school programs. http://www.summerdalelibrary.com/index.html

== Parks and Recreation ==
=== Pioneer Park ===
Located in the center of what some call “Downtown Summerdale”, Pioneer Park is home to community events, walking trail, and rich history. This park is surrounded by iconic buildings such as the old Tobacco Warehouse, Jurkiewicz Hardware Store, and other old buildings and homes built in the early 1900s. The town clock and a gazebo are located in the park along with a line of large shady oak trees which have survived many hurricanes. The park has brick sidewalks and benches to enjoy. This park is close to the Splash Park and the Tennis Courts and a few blocks away from the school and the library.

=== Tennis Courts ===
In 2022, the Town of Summerdale completed new tennis courts located on NW 1st Street.

=== Children’s Splash Park ===
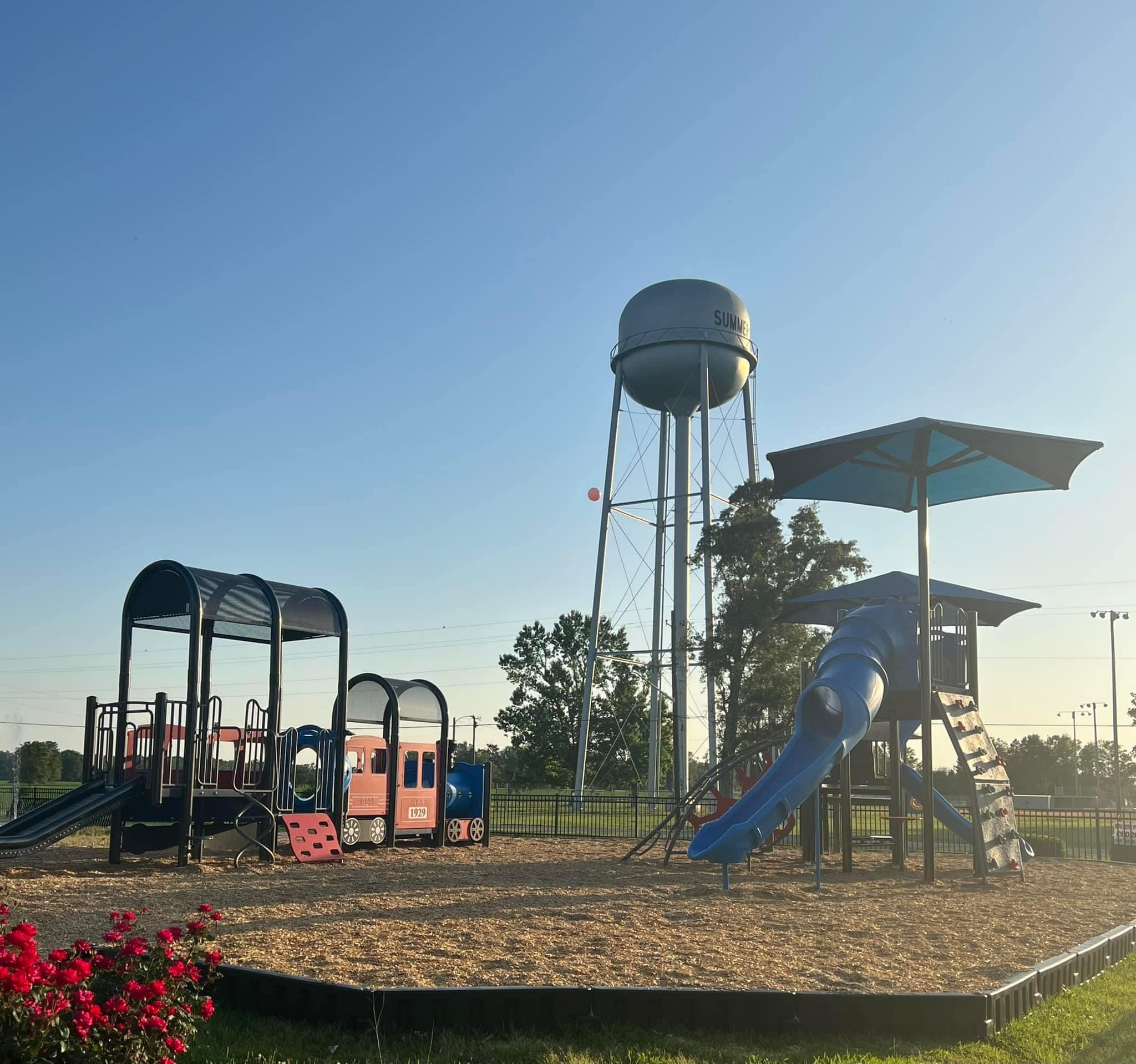
2022 New Playground at Splash Park

Located on NW 1st Street (County Rd 71), the children’s splash park is a fun place to take your little ones between April and October. In 2022, the town added a playground to the splash park area. There is also a gazebo available at this park.

=== Community Center ===
The Community Center is located in the heart of the community and offers a well shaded playground.

=== Sidewalks ===
Summerdale's walking trail starts at Pioneer Park, which is brick. There is a sitting area around the Towns' clock. The sidewalk then goes in front of the Old Tobacco Warehouse that was built in the early 1900's, then crosses Hamm St. where the sidewalk turns to all concrete. In an effort to become more of a walkable community, Summerdale is in the process of expanding sidewalks throughout town. The existing sidewalks and the additional upcoming sidewalks help connect the community to the parks.

=== Baseball Parks ===
Two baseball fields are located near the water tower on County Rd 71.

== See also ==
- Central Baldwin
