= Naval Outlying Landing Field Barin =

- IATA: NHX; ICAO: KNBJ; FAA LID: NBJ

Summary
- Airport type: Military
- Owner: U.S. Navy
- Location: Foley, Alabama
- Built: 1942
- In use: 1942-Present
- Elevation AMSL: 54 ft / 16 m
- Coordinates: 30°23′21″N 087°38′07″W
- Interactive map of Naval Outlying Landing Field Barin

Runways
Direction	Length		Surface
Direction	ft	m	Surface
9/27	5,000	1,524	Asphalt
15/33	5,000	1,524	Asphalt
- Source: Federal Aviation Administration

Naval Outlying Landing Field Barin (IATA: NHX, ICAO: KNBJ, FAA LID: NBJ) is a United States Navy airfield located in Foley, a city in Baldwin County, Alabama, United States.

== History ==
An auxiliary airfield for Naval Air Station Pensacola and Naval Air Station Whiting Field, NOLF Barin originally consisted of twin airfield complexes. The West Field was established on the site of the original Foley Municipal Airport that was constructed in the mid-1930s and leased by the U.S. Navy in 1942. An adjoining parcel of 656 acres was also purchased by the Navy for construction of a similar, but not quite reverse, mirror image runway complex that would become known as the East Field. On 2 July 1942, the new facility was designated Naval Auxiliary Air Station Barin Field (NAAS Barin Field) in honor of Lieutenant Louis Theodore Barin (20 August 1890 – 12 June 1920), a Navy test pilot and one of the pilots of the flying boat NC-1 during the Navy's transatlantic flight in May 1919.

Today, the East Field is still used as NOLF Barin, a satellite airfield for Training Air Wing FIVE (TRAWING 5) at NAS Whiting Field and Training Air Wing SIX (TRAWING 6) at NAS Pensacola. Two runways and the original centerfield flight line complex are still maintained, although the original 1940s/1950s-era hangars and control tower have been demolished and removed. The West Field of four runways remains abandoned, with a 4-lane highway, the Foley Beach Express, having been built through the center of the West Field's runways.

The City of Foley signed a letter of intent with the Navy in January 2024 to continue an agreement that allows the city to maintain the field. The following December, the city announced plans for an aviation museum to recognize the history of the airfield.

== Facilities ==
NOLF Barin has two asphalt paved runways: 9/27 is 4,012 by 300 feet (1,223 x 91 m) and 15/33 is 4,000 by 150 feet (1,219 x 46 m).

In 2010, officials from NAS Whiting Field announced plans to expand the runways for several NOLFs they operate (including NOLF Barin) to facilitate the use of the T-6 Texan II training aircraft, which had replaced the aging fleet of T-34C Turbomentors in TRAWING 6 and was replacing those in TRAWING 5. Those plans subsequently came under heavy opposition by some residents who were worried about aircraft noise or losing homes and land in the process. In November 2011, starting with negotiations with the Foley City Council, the Navy began acquiring land parcels to expand NOLF Barin Field and military construction subsequently commenced in 2012.

In November 2014, the Baldwin County Commission unanimously approved a land deal to enable the Navy to finally complete the expansion of the NOLF Barin Field runway lengths.

Both runways at NOLF Barin were subsequently lengthened to their current length of 5,000 feet.
