= Middleton Field =

Airport in Alabama, United States

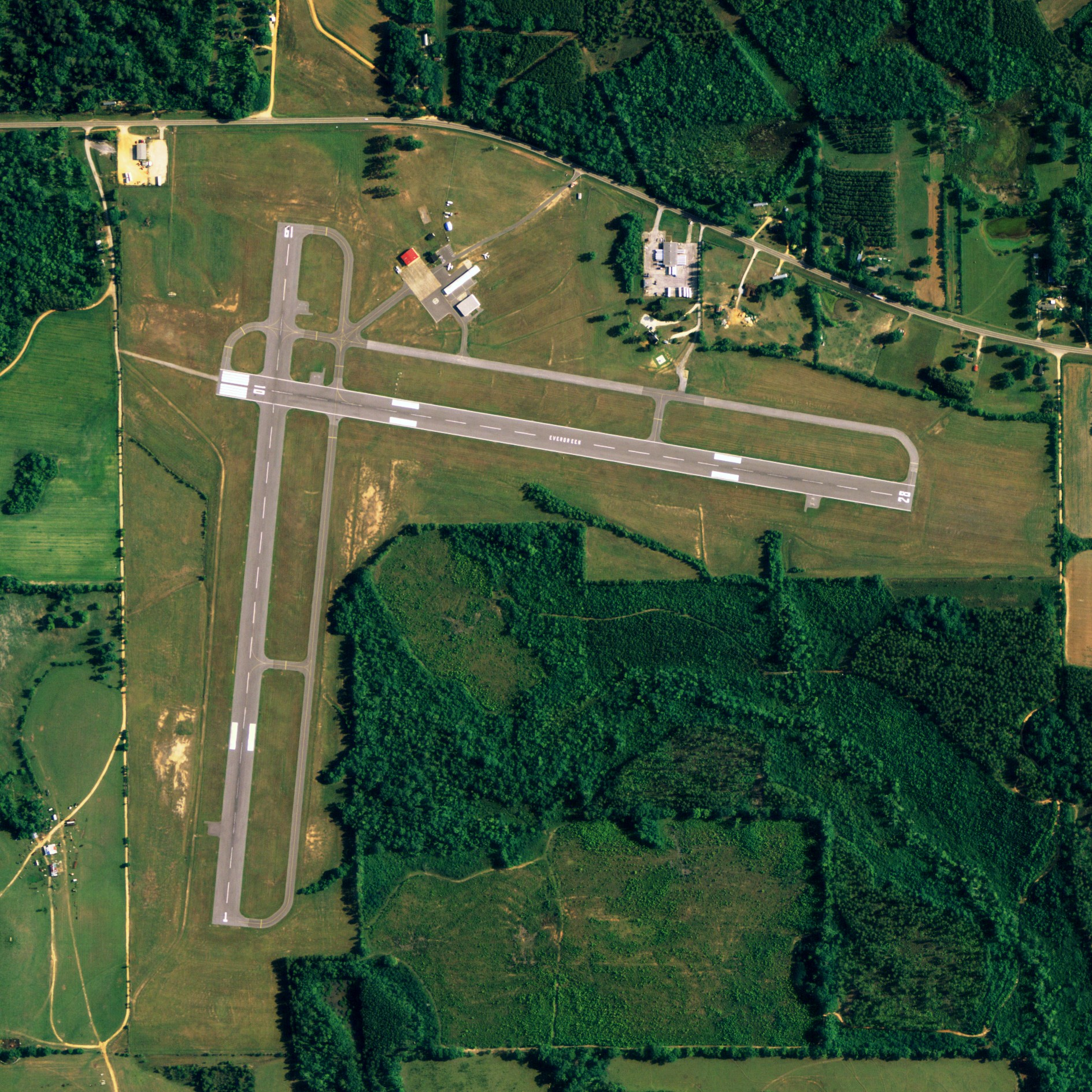
- NAIP aerial image, 30 June 2006
- IATA: none; ICAO: KGZH; FAA LID: GZH

Summary
- Airport type: Public / military
- Owner: City of Evergreen
- Serves: Evergreen, Alabama
- Elevation AMSL: 259 ft (79 m)
- Coordinates: 31°24′57″N 087°02′39″W
- Interactive map of Middleton Field

Runways
Direction	Length		Surface
Direction	ft	m	Surface
1/19	5,005	1,526	Asphalt
10/28	5,004	1,525	Asphalt

Statistics (2017)
- Aircraft operations: 134,005
- Based aircraft: 10
- Source: Federal Aviation Administration

Middleton Field (ICAO: KGZH, FAA LID: GZH, formerly 39J) is a public-use airport located 5 nautical miles (9.3 km; 5.8 mi) west of the central business district of Evergreen, a city in Conecuh County, Alabama, United States. According to the FAA's National Plan of Integrated Airport Systems for 2009–2013, it is categorized as a general aviation facility. Although the airport is owned by the City of Evergreen, it is primarily used for flight training by the U.S. Navy as Naval Outlying Field Evergreen under Whiting Field.

Although most U.S. airports use the same three-letter location identifier for the FAA and IATA, Middleton Field is assigned GZH by the FAA but has no designation from the IATA.

== History ==
Middleton Field was constructed in 1931 as an emergency landing field for Contract Air Mail route 23 (CAM-23). In 1943, the U.S. Navy began using the airfield as an Outlying Field for pilots training in Pensacola. The airway beacon at Middleton Field is listed on the Alabama Register of Landmarks and Heritage.

== Facilities and aircraft ==
Middleton Field covers an area of 200 acres (81 ha) which contains two asphalt paved runways (1/19 and 10/28) each measuring 4,000 by 150 ft (1,219 by 46 m).

For the 12-month period ending June 25, 2007, the airport had 134,005 aircraft operations, an average of 367 per day: 96% military and 4% general aviation.

== Accidents ==
On July 13, 1982, Lt. Cmdr. Barbara Allen Rainey, the U.S. Navy's first female pilot, and her student were killed in a crash while practicing touch-and-go landings at Middleton Field. The resulting litigation, Beech Aircraft Corp. v. Rainey, went to the U.S. Supreme Court.

== See also ==
- List of airports in Alabama
