= Naval Air Station Whiting Field =

US Navy base near Milton, Florida

- Near Milton, Florida in the United States
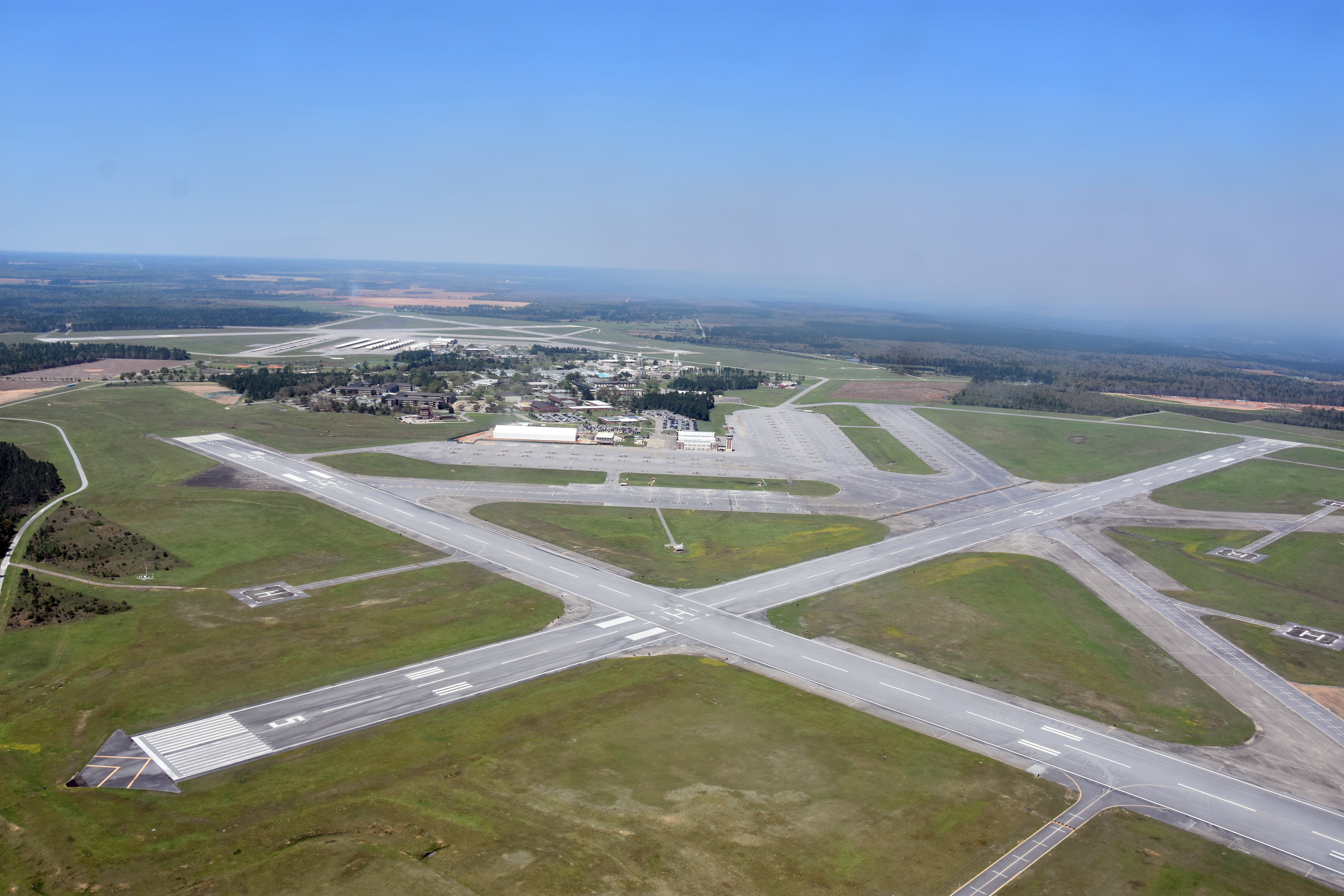
- NAS Whiting Field in 2021

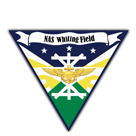

Site information
- Type: Naval Air Station
- Owner: Department of Defense
- Operator: US Navy
- Controlled by: Navy Region Southeast
- Condition: Operational
- Website: Official website

Location
- Location in the United States
- Coordinates: 30°42′45″N 87°01′06″W

Site history
- Built: 1943
- In use: 1943–present

Garrison information
- Garrison: Training Air Wing Five

Airfield information
- Identifiers: WMO: 722226
- For airfield information see NAS Whiting Field – North and NAS Whiting Field – South

Naval Air Station Whiting Field is a United States Navy base located near Milton, Florida, with some outlying fields near Navarre, Florida, in south and central Santa Rosa County, and is one of the Navy's two primary pilot training bases (the other being NAS Corpus Christi, Texas). NAS Whiting Field provides training for U.S. Navy, U.S. Marine Corps, Coast Guard, and Air Force student pilots, as well as those of several allied nations. NAS Whiting Field is home to Training Air Wing Five (TRAWING 5).

NAS Whiting Field is actually two airfields sharing a common support base. Primary Flight Training student aviators fly the Beechcraft T-6 Texan II from North Whiting Field (KNSE) while Advanced Helicopter Training takes place utilizing the TH-73A Thrasher at South Whiting Field (KNDZ).

== Namesake ==
Whiting Field is named for Kenneth Whiting, who was commissioned from the United States Naval Academy on 25 February 1908. Whiting qualified in submarines, commanding USS Porpoise (SS-7), USS Shark (SS-8), USS Tarpon (SS-175), and USS Seal (SS-183). In 1914 he learned to fly under Orville Wright and was designated Naval Aviator number 16. He assumed command of the 1st Naval Air Unit in France following America's entry into World War I and was subsequently assigned to command Naval Air Stations 14 and 15 at RNAS Killingholme, England. He was awarded the Navy Cross "for exceptionally meritorious service in a duty of great responsibility." After the war he was partially responsible for the conversion of collier Jupiter into the Navy's first aircraft carrier USS Langley (CV-1). He subsequently commanded Langley and USS Saratoga (CV-3), and various air squadrons prior to his retirement as captain in June 1940.

== Operations ==
North Field is used solely for T-6 Texan II fixed-wing, primary flight training operations. Students from the United States Navy, Marine Corps, Coast Guard, and Air Force (as well as exchange students from various allied nations) go through the T-6B Joint Primary Aircraft Training System syllabus.

South Field is utilized for United States Navy, U.S. Marine Corps, U.S. Coast Guard, and select NATO/Allied students in the Advanced Helicopter pipeline, flying the TH-73A Thrasher. Upon completion of this syllabus U.S. students will become designated as Naval Aviators and assigned to their respective Fleet Replacement Squadron (FRS) or the Coast Guard Aviation Training Center in Mobile, Alabama for follow-on-training.

== Squadrons ==
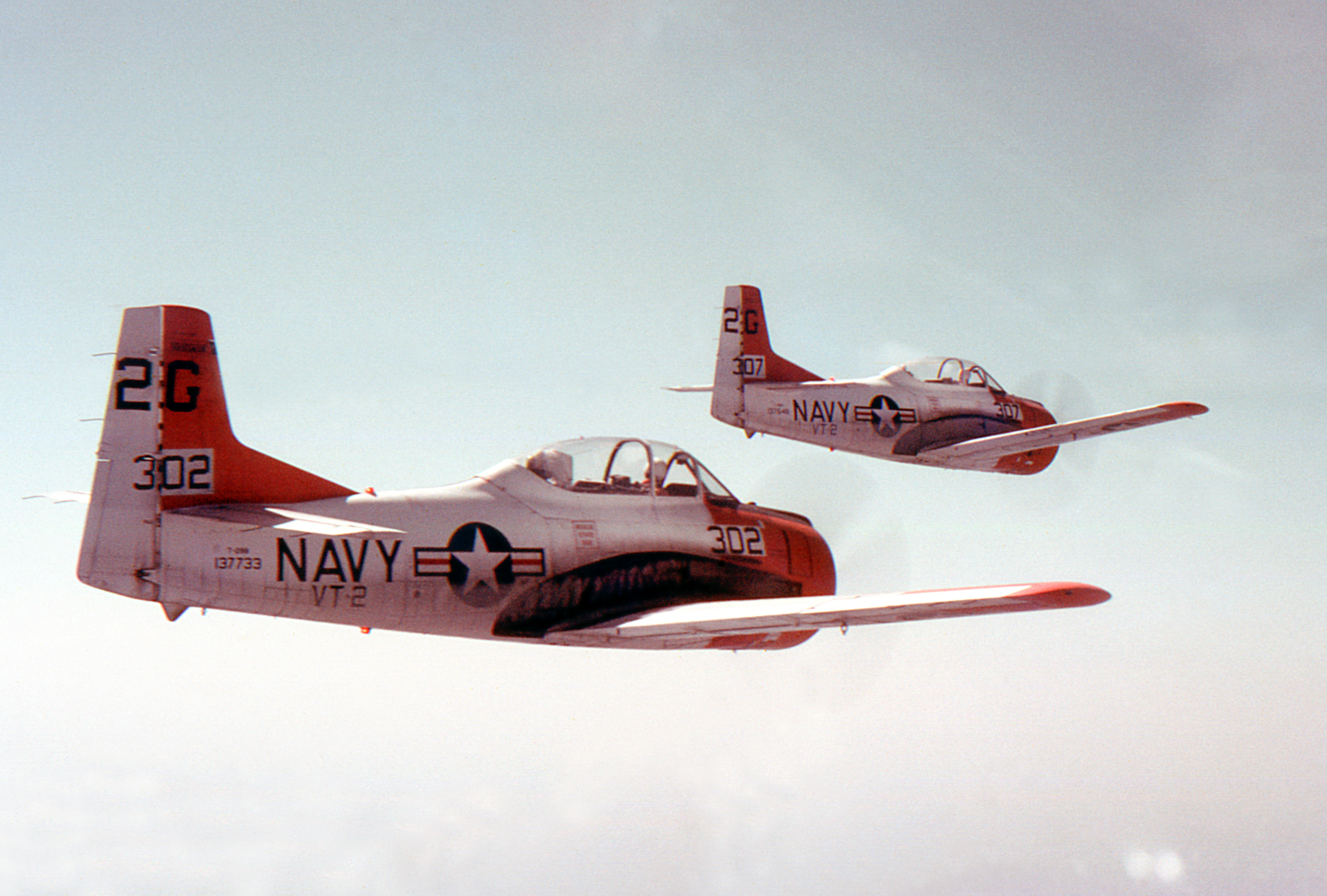
T-28s from VT-2 at Whiting field in 1967.

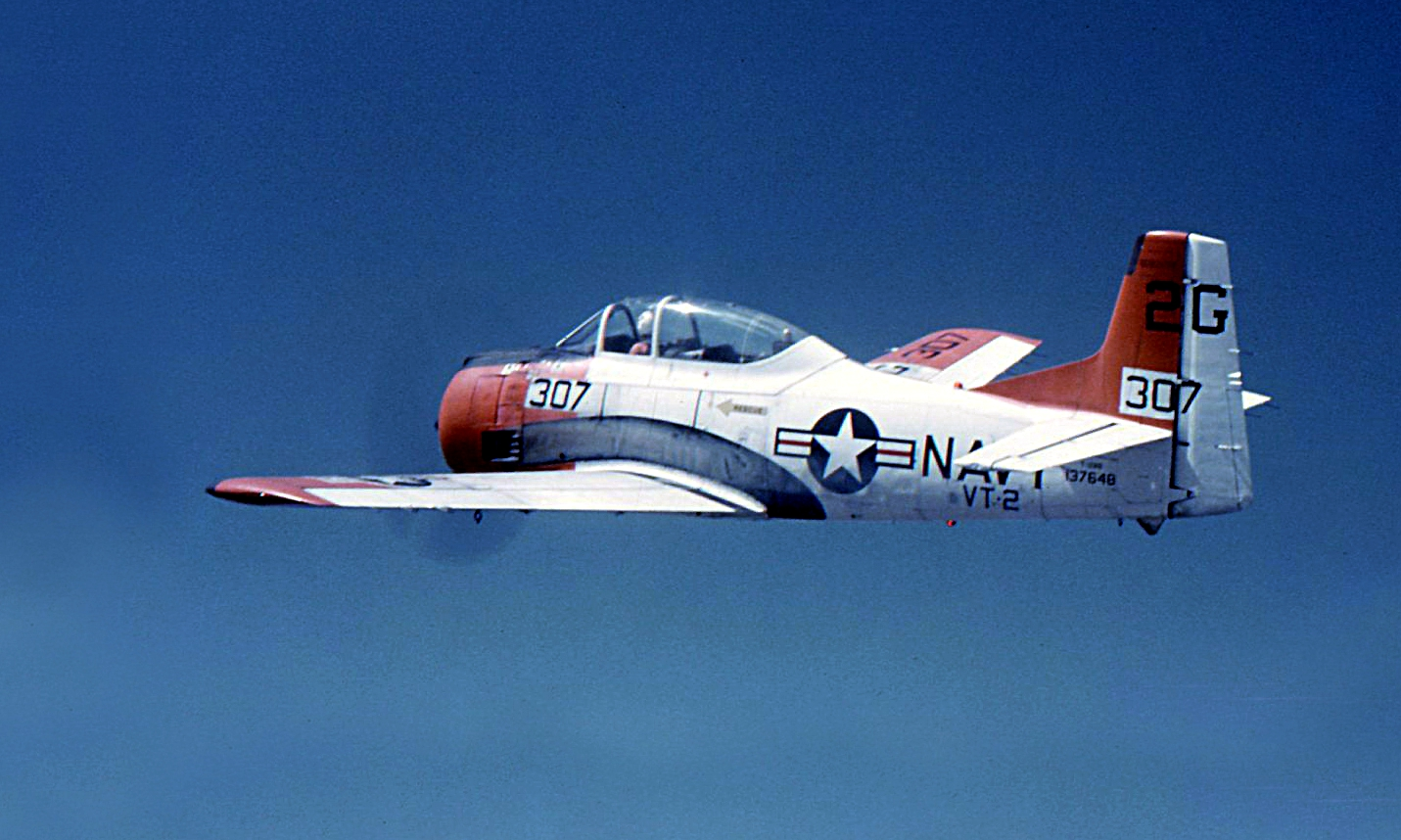
T-28B from Whiting Field in 1967

T-6B Texan II
- VT-2 Doerbirds
- VT-3 Red Knights
- VT-6 Shooters
TH-73A Thrasher
- HT-8 Eightballers
- HT-18 Vigilant Eagles
- HT-28 Hellions

== Outlying fields ==
Fixed Wing Fields
Name	State	Coordinates	Notes
NOLF Barin	AL	30°23′21″N 87°38′07″W	Primary Student Solo Field: Area 1
NOLF Brewton	AL	31°03′03″N 87°03′57″W	Secondary Student Solo Field: Area 2
NOLF Choctaw	FL	30°30′33″N 86°57′28″W	
NOLF Evergreen	AL	31°24′53″N 87°02′40″W	Primary Student Solo Field: Area 2
NOLF Holley	FL	30°25′32″N 86°53′42″W	Closed
~~NOLF Silverhill~~	AL	30°33′47″N 87°48′35″W	Area 1, Closed (Note: These stations are currently marked as "unverified" on sectional charts and their FAA Location Identifiers (NQB & NHL) are no longer listed in FAA databases. Additionally, satellite imagery shows their runways marked as closed.)
NOLF Summerdale	AL	30°30′28″N 87°38′44″W	Area 1
~~NOLF Wolf~~	AL	30°20′37″N 87°32′29″W	Closed

Helicopter Fields
Name	State	Coordinates	Notes
NOLF Spencer	FL	30°37′30″N 87°08′24″W	
NOLF Santa Rosa	FL	30°36′39″N 86°56′24″W	
NOLF Pace	FL	30°42′09″N 87°11′13″W	
NOLF Site X	FL	30°48′49″N 87°10′04″W	
NOLF Harold	FL	30°40′43″N 86°53′00″W	

== History ==
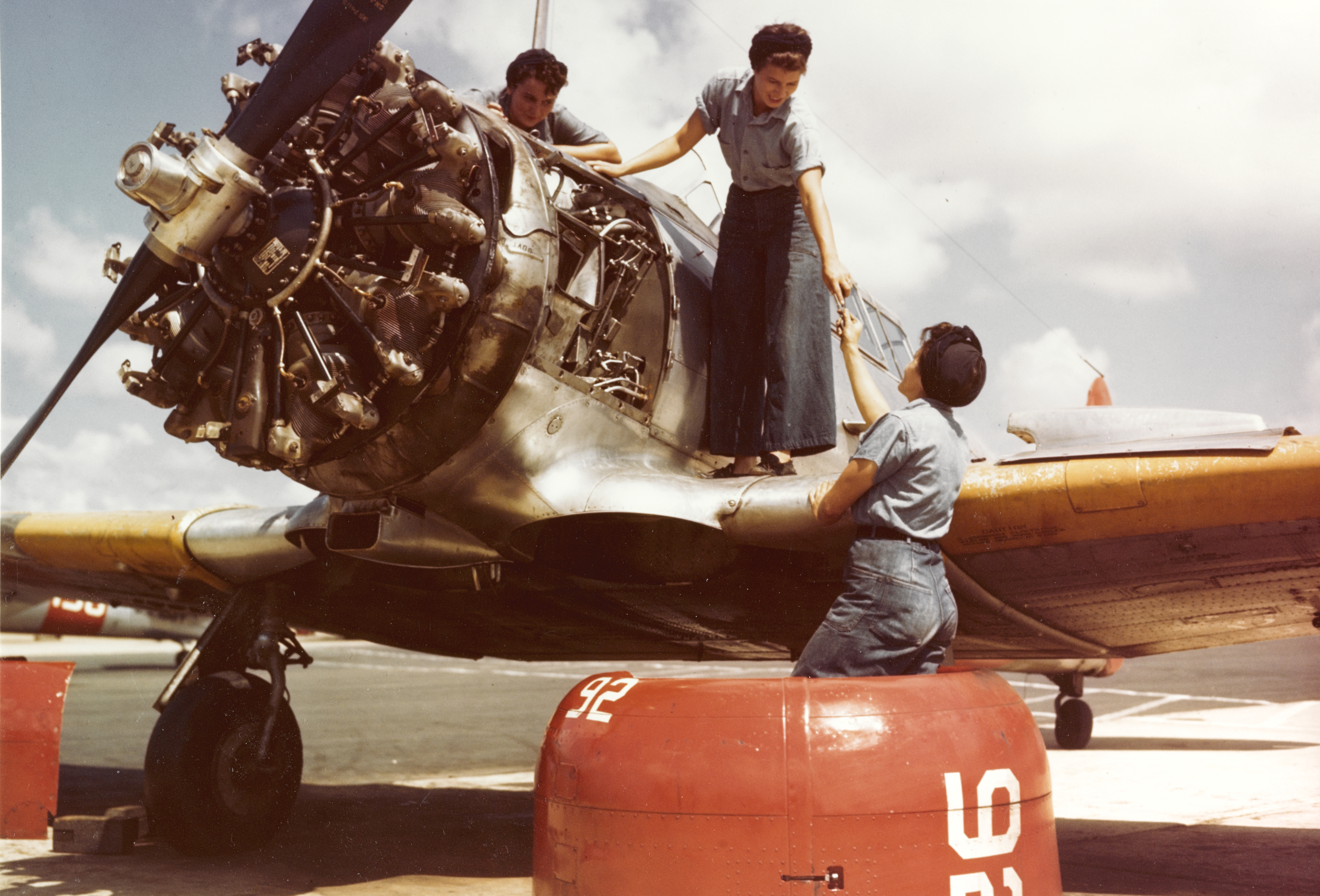
Mechanics working on a Texan trainer, c. 1943

Naval Auxiliary Air Station (NAAS) Whiting Field was commissioned on July 16, 1943, by Rear Admiral George D. Murray, Commandant of the Naval Air Training Center, and the widow of Naval Captain Kenneth Whiting, after whom the station was named. During construction, a prisoner of war camp was located at the station, providing additional labor.

Jet trainers first arrived at Whiting Field in early August 1949 when eight TO-1 Shooting Stars transferred from NAS Corpus Christi, Texas as part of a new transitional jet training squadron to commence operations in September 1949, commanded by Lt. Cmdr. V. P. O'Neil, USN. The Blue Angels demonstration team moved its headquarters to Whiting Field from NAS Corpus Christi, Texas, in 1955.

In 1982, Lieutenant Commander Barbara Allen Rainey, the first US female naval aviator, was killed along with a trainee at Naval Outlying Landing Field Evergreen. The subsequent product liability lawsuit led to a U.S. Supreme Court case, Beech Aircraft Corp. v. Rainey.

On Friday August 6, 2021 Training Air Wing 5 received the first one of its new training helicopter. This is the Leonardo TH-73A Thrasher of Italian origin.

== See also ==
- List of United States Navy airfields
- NAS Whiting Field – North (T-6B fixed wing training only)
- NAS Whiting Field – South (TH-73A helicopter training only)
