= Brewton Municipal Airport =

Airport in Alabama, United States

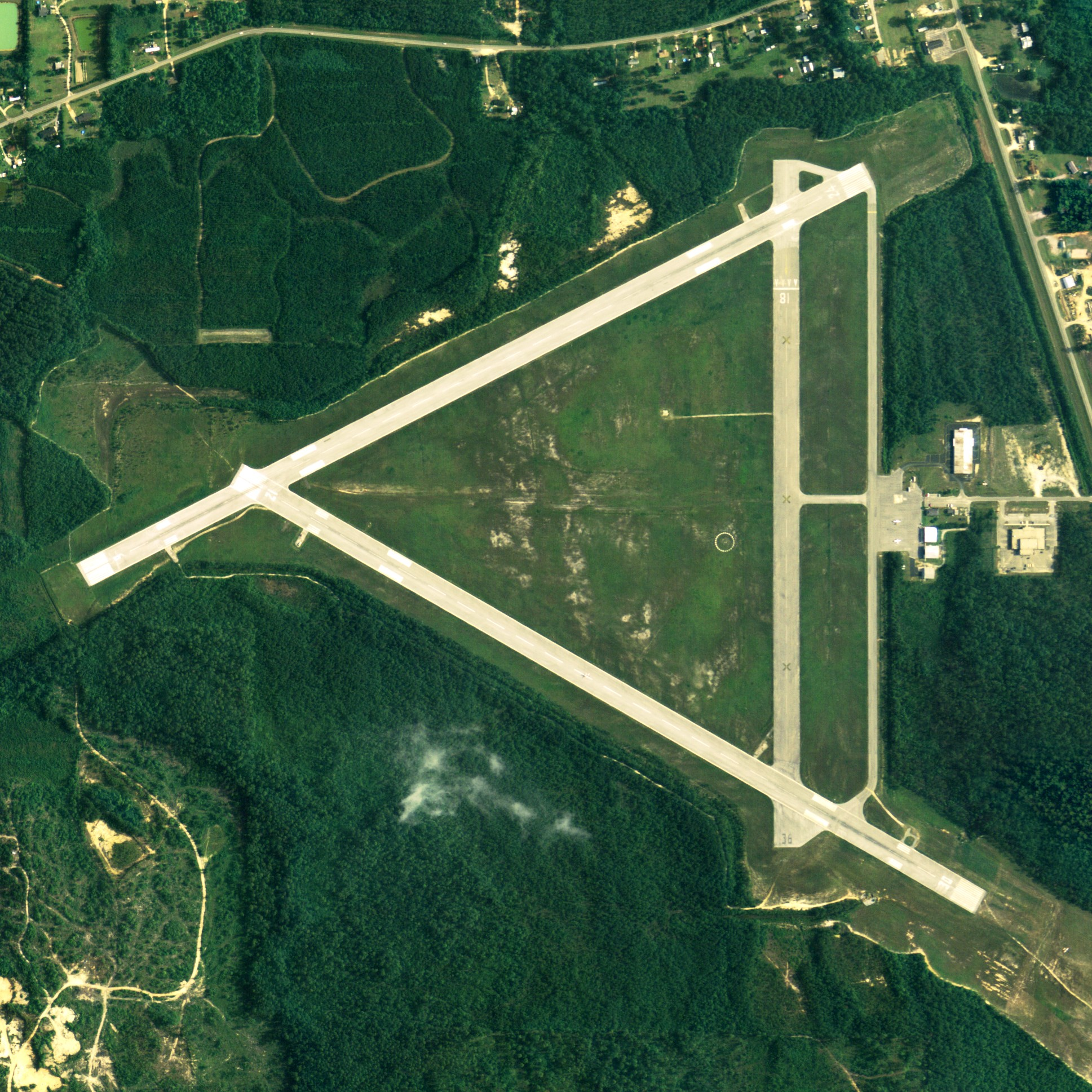
- NAIP aerial image, 30 June 2006
- IATA: none; ICAO: none; FAA LID: 12J

Summary
- Airport type: Public
- Owner: Brewton, Alabama
- Serves: Brewton, Alabama
- Elevation AMSL: 99 ft (30 m)
- Coordinates: 31°03′02″N 087°03′56″W
- Interactive map of Brewton Municipal Airport

Runways
Direction	Length		Surface
Direction	ft	m	Surface
6/24	5,136	1,565	Asphalt
12/30	5,001	1,524	Asphalt

Statistics (2017)
- Aircraft operations: 165,500
- Based aircraft: 19
- Source: Federal Aviation Administration

Brewton Municipal Airport (FAA LID: 12J) is a city-owned public-use airport located 3 nautical miles (6 km) south of the central business district of Brewton, a city in Escambia County, Alabama, United States. Originally constructed by the U.S. Navy during World War II as an auxiliary field to the Naval Air Station Pensacola complex, it was later redesignated as Navy Outlying Landing Field (NOLF) Brewton before being conveyed to the city of Brewton as a public use facility. Although under civilian ownership, the airfield still functions concurrently as NOLF Brewton and is used by Navy training aircraft located at Naval Air Station Whiting Field, Florida.

According to the FAA's National Plan of Integrated Airport Systems for 2009–2013, it is categorized as a general aviation facility.

== Facilities and aircraft ==
Brewton Municipal Airport covers an area of 880 acres (1.38 sq mi; 3.56 km^{2}) which contains three asphalt paved runways: Runway 6/24 is 5,135 x 150 feet (1,565 x 46 meters); Runway 12/30 is 5,066 x 150 feet (1,544 x 46 meters) and Runway 18/36 is 4,100 x 150 feet (1,250 x 46 meters). For the 12-month period ending June 29, 2007 the airport had 165,500 general aviation/military aircraft operations.

== See also ==
- List of airports in Alabama
