= Training Air Wing One =

Training Air Wing ONE
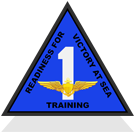
- TW-1 Insignia
- Active: January 1972 - Present
- Country: United States of America
- Branch: United States Navy
- Part of: Naval Air Training Command
- Garrison/HQ: Naval Air Station Meridian
- Tail Code: A

Commanders
- Commodore: CAPT Robert T. Lanane II, USN

Training Air Wing ONE (TW-1 or TRAWING 1) is a United States Navy aircraft training air wing based aboard Naval Air Station Meridian, located 11 miles northeast of Meridian, Mississippi in Lauderdale County and Kemper County. TW-1 is one of five training air wings in the Naval Air Training Command, and consists of two jet training squadrons. The wing trains Student Naval Aviators from the U.S. Navy, U.S. Marine Corps, and international allies. Following completion of primary flight training and selection of an advanced training pipeline, Student Naval Aviators are assigned to TW-1 for either intermediate and advanced strike pipeline training or advanced E-2/C-2 training in the T-45C Goshawk jet training aircraft.

TW-1 produces approximately 50% of the U.S. Navy's tailhook pilots, with the other 50% produced at Training Air Wing Two stationed at NAS Kingsville in Kingsville, Texas. Following the completion of training with TW-1, Student Naval Aviators are designated Naval Aviators and presented with their "Wings of Gold."

== Mission ==
Today, TW-1's mission is to train future U.S. Navy and Marine Student Naval Aviators, along with aviators of allies of the United States. Navy and Marine students are selected from top performing students who have completed primary flight training in the T-6B at either Naval Air Station Whiting Field or Naval Air Station Corpus Christi.

After joining TW-1, students are trained in the T-45C over a 12 month long syllabus consisting of over 130 flights in the aircraft, accumulating over 160 hours. The training syllabus culminates with carrier qualifications (CarQuals). Upon completion of the training syllabus, Student Naval Aviators assigned to TW-1 are designated as Naval Aviators and earn their "Wings of Gold" and receive follow-on assignments with Fleet Replacement Squadrons before their first fleet tour.

The instructor pilot cadre at Training Air Wing ONE is composed of men and women from almost every Navy and Marine Corps aviation community as well as several international military exchange pilots, bringing an enormous array of fleet experience to the training command. Training Air Wing ONE is also tasked with training international military aviators from countries including France, Italy, and Spain.

== History ==
Training Air Wing One (TW-1) was commissioned on 2 August 1971, as the first Training Air Wing to incorporate the single-site training concept. Until that time, jet aviation students received only the basic flight syllabus at NAS Meridian prior to being transferred to bases in Texas for advanced flight training. At the same time Training Squadron Nineteen (VT-19) was established.

October 1971 saw the arrival of the TA-4J, two-seat trainer based on the A-4 "Skyhawk". In October 1998, VT-19 was re-designated VT-9. In July 1994, Training Squadron Twenty-Three (VT-23) moved from Kingsville, Texas, to NAS Meridian. 1st Lt. Karen Fuller Tribbett received her Wings of Gold on 17 October 1997, becoming the first female strike pilot in the U.S. Marine Corps.

The TA-4J "Skyhawk" was retired in 1999. In December of that year, VT-7 assumed the advanced training mission using the T-45C "Goshawk." At that time, VT-23 was disestablished. In July 2004, the last T-2C "Buckeye" left NAS Meridian marking the end of Navy strike pilot training in that aircraft.

Training Squadron Seven (VT-7) converted to an advanced training squadron and the initiation of air-to-air combat gunnery and carrier qualification instruction in Training Squadron Nine (VT-9), student naval aviators (SNA's) were able to complete the entire jet-training syllabus while stationed at NAS Meridian.

The mission of Training Air Wing One is to provide newly designated aviators to the fleet for further training in operational combat aircraft and is conveyed in the wing motto, "Readiness for Victory at Sea Through Training."

== Subordinate units ==
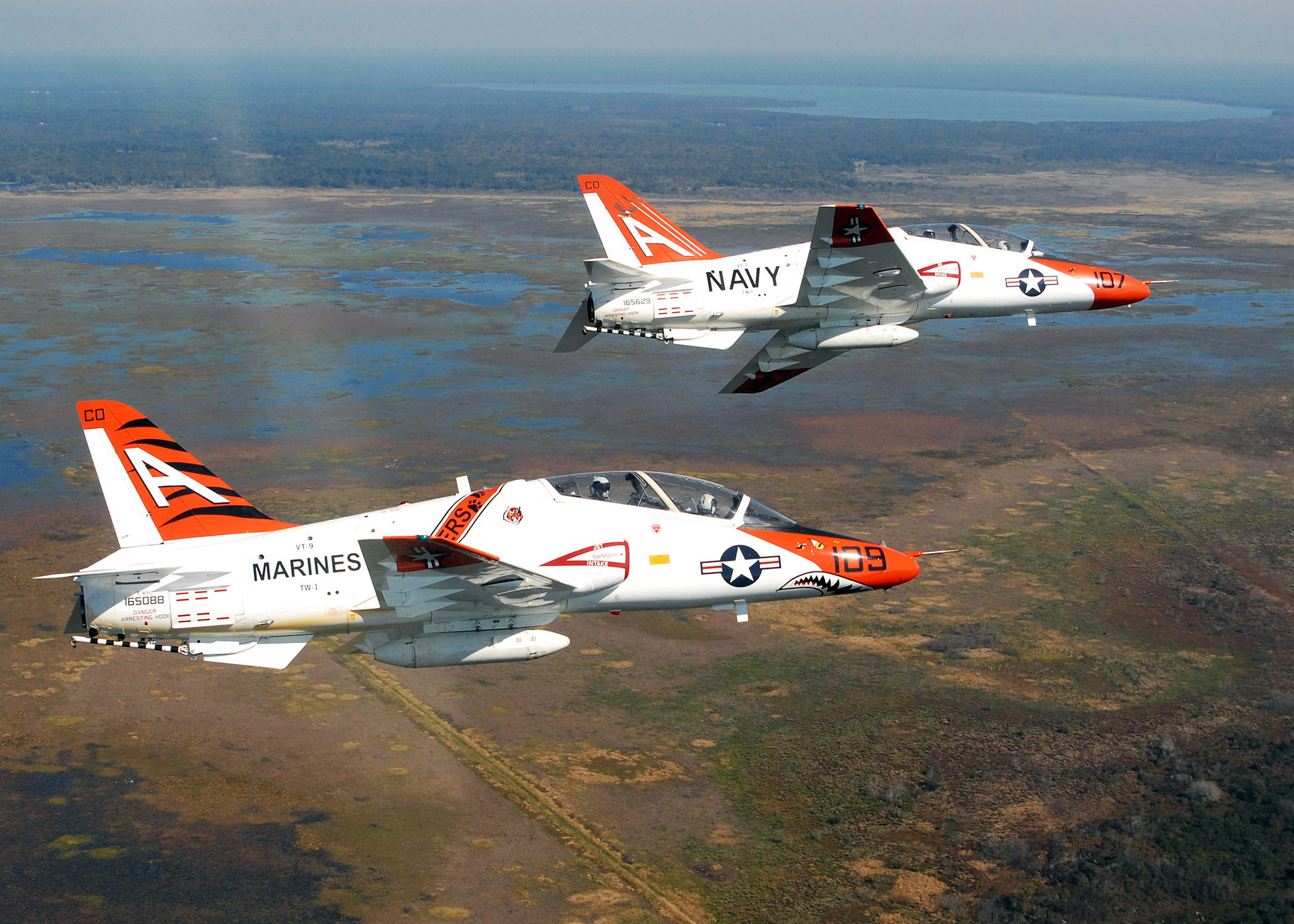
Two T-45C assigned to TW-1 prepare to perform flyover maneuvers for football fans at Ben Hill Griffin Stadium

TW-1 consists of two jet intermediate and advanced training squadrons.

Code	Insignia	Squadron	Nickname	Assigned Aircraft
VT-7		Training Squadron 7	Eagles	T-45C Goshawk
VT-9		Training Squadron 9	Tigers	T-45C Goshawk

== Current force ==
=== Fixed-wing aircraft ===
- T-45C Goshawk

== Strike Flight Curriculum ==
The T-45 Strike Flight Curriculum consists of 21 stages split between an Intermediate phase and Advanced phase. During these 21 stages students will fly approximately 160 hours in the T-45C Goshawk of which nearly 40 hours are solo. Student naval aviators or SNAs will also fly approximately 96 hours in aircraft simulators before they complete the syllabus.

"First the students complete their Ground School and sims, which lasts between 1 and 1.5 months" (This covers aerodynamics, meteorology, engineering, navigation and emergency procedures). This is followed up by some back-seat rides in the T-45 to cover the instruments. "Phase 1 then sees them start doing cross-country flights, Fams (familiarisation flights-aerobatics, approaches, stalls, emergency landings) and Field Carrier Landing Practice".

During this stage the students are qualified to fly solo in the T-45C in all weather conditions, day and night, they learn to fly in two and four plane formation flights, and they learn how to land the T-45C the same way they will on an Aircraft Carrier.

Field Carrier Landing Practice (FCLP) is the final Intermediate Jet part of the course and this is where the students really begin to ready themselves to be tail-hookers. FCLP is designed to prepare the students for landing on an aircraft carrier and sees them perform 'touch and goes' on a simulated flight deck painted on the runway, observed by a Landing Signals Officer (LSO) who critiques and grades their performance. A Fresnel Lens Optical Landing System (known as the Meatball, or ball) on the runway verge, as fitted to all aircraft carriers and is used to assist the pilot in completing a successful trap on the flight deck. Most of this phase of training takes place at Naval Outlying Field Joe Williams, approximately 25 miles northwest of Naval Air Station Meridian.

The next phase is tactical flying, this covers Air combat manoeuvring (ACM), air to surface attacks with inert ordnance and two-ship low-level formation flights. The final phase of training is Carrier Qualification (CarQual). Pilots must complete ten daytime 'traps' (arrested landings), with four touch & goes aboard an aircraft carrier at sea. On successful completion of the course, Student Naval Aviators assigned to TW-1 are designated as Naval Aviators and earn their "Wings of Gold".
