= VT-7 =

Training Squadron 7
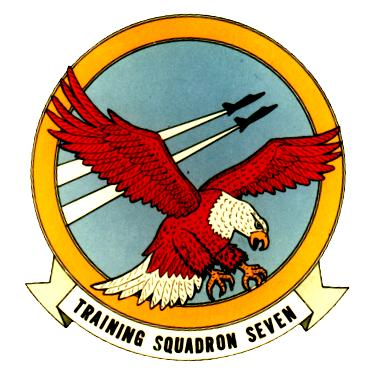
- VT-7 Logo
- Active: July 1960-present
- Country: United States of America
- Branch: United States Navy
- Type: Training
- Part of: Training Air Wing One
- Nickname: Eagles

Commanders
- Current commander: CDR Tom Kellner

Aircraft flown
- Trainer: McDonnell Douglas T-45 Goshawk

Training Squadron SEVEN (VT-7), known as the Eagles, is one of four U.S. Navy strike jet training squadrons and one of two based at Naval Air Station (NAS) Meridian. VT-7, along with Training Squadron NINE (VT-9), make up Training Air Wing One of the Naval Air Training Command. In addition to providing advanced training for strike jets, VT-7 provides additional advanced training for airborne early warning and carrier onboard delivery aircraft. VT-7 also trains United States Marine Corps (USMC) aviators and select foreign military pilots.

== History ==
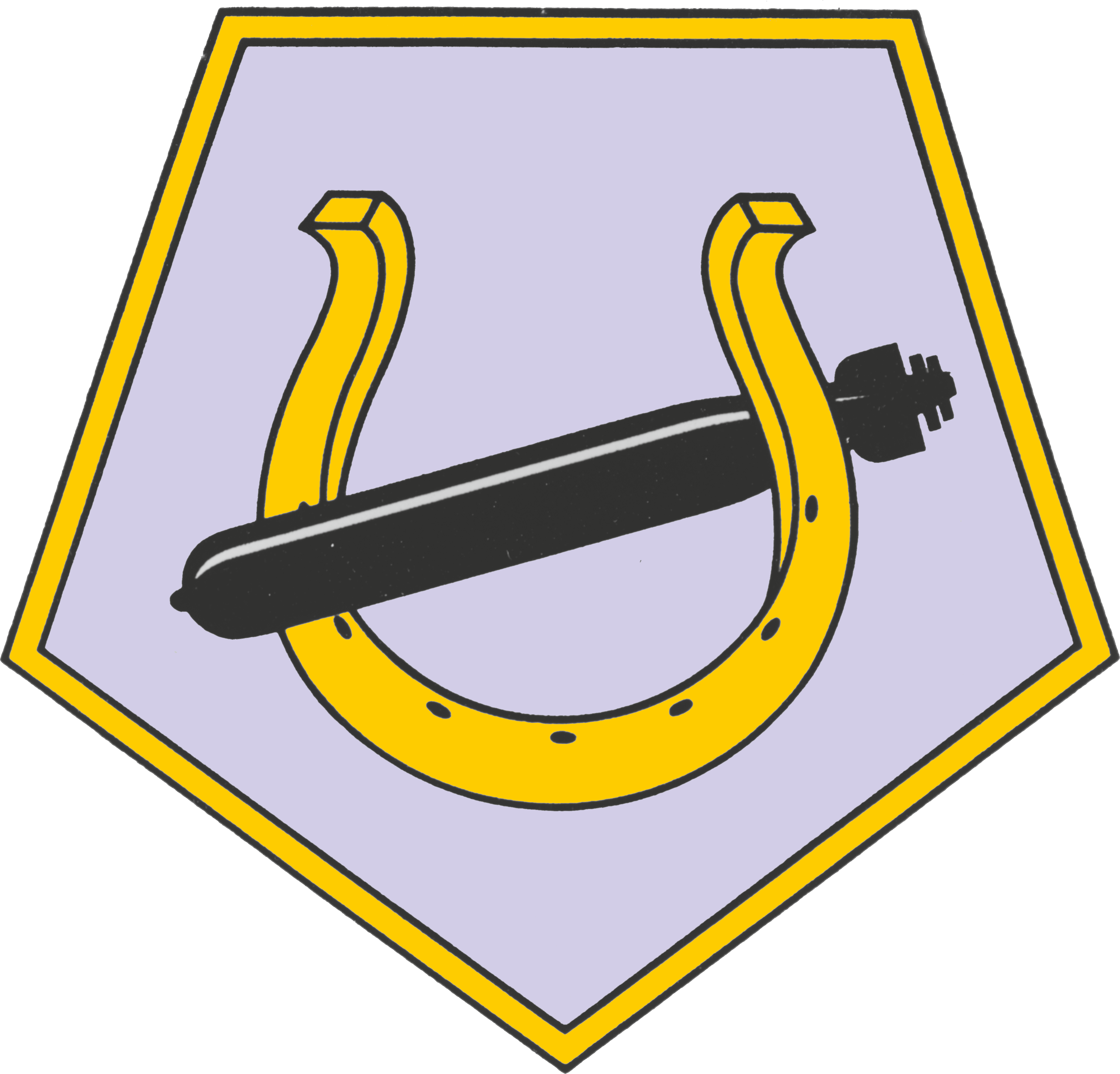
Insignia of the U.S. Navy Torpedo Squadron 7 (VT-7)

Training Squadron SEVEN (VT-7) is the second squadron to be designated VT-7. In 1927, the squadron was established as Torpedo Squadron SEVEN flying the Martin T3M. In 1946, VT was discontinued as a designation for US Navy air squadrons.

In July 1958, Advanced Training Unit (ATU)-105 and ATU-205, located at Naval Air Station Memphis, consolidated to form Basic Training Group Seven (BTG-7). BTG-7 trained using the T-28 Trojan and T-29 Seastar. In July 1960, BTG-7 was based at NAS Kingsville and was redesignated Training Squadron SEVEN (VT-7). In July 1961, VT-7 moved to NAS Meridian. Five months later, VT-7 split to form VT-9. In 1994, VT-23 was transferred from Training Air Wing Two to NAS Meridian, bringing the total number of training squadrons at NAS Meridian to three. In 1999, the Navy decreased the number of squadrons in Training Air Wing One to two to mirror the total number of squadrons in Training Air Wing Two and deactivated VT-23. The instructors from VT-23 were moved to VT-7.

From 1962 to 1971, VT-7 operated the T-2A Buckeye. By 1972, the Douglas TA-4J Skyhawk began being used to train pilots for advanced strike missions. VT-7 was the only Training Squadron to use the TA-4J to train foreign military pilots, including pilots from France, Spain, Italy, Kuwait, Thailand, Brazil, and Singapore. The last TA-4J left NAS Meridian in October 1999 and was transferred to Davis–Monthan Air Force Base for storage. The T4-AJ was replaced by the T-45C Goshawk as the primary training aircraft in 1999.

VT-7 has trained over 4,200 US military aviators and over 360 foreign military aviators.

The squadron has been awarded twenty Chief of Naval Operations Aviation Safety Awards.

== Mission ==
VT-7 has the identical mission of its sister squadron, VT-9: to further train US Navy, USMC, and select foreign military pilots in intermediate and advanced flight training. After primary flight training is completed at NAS Whiting Field or NAS Corpus Christi, students are assigned to one of five advanced flight training paths: strike training/jet at NAS Meridian or NAS Kingsville, E-2 Hawkeye/C-2 Greyhound at NAS Corpus Christi, Maritime at NAS Corpus Christi, E-6 TACAMO at NAS Corpus Christi, or helicopter/MV-22 at NAS Whiting Field.

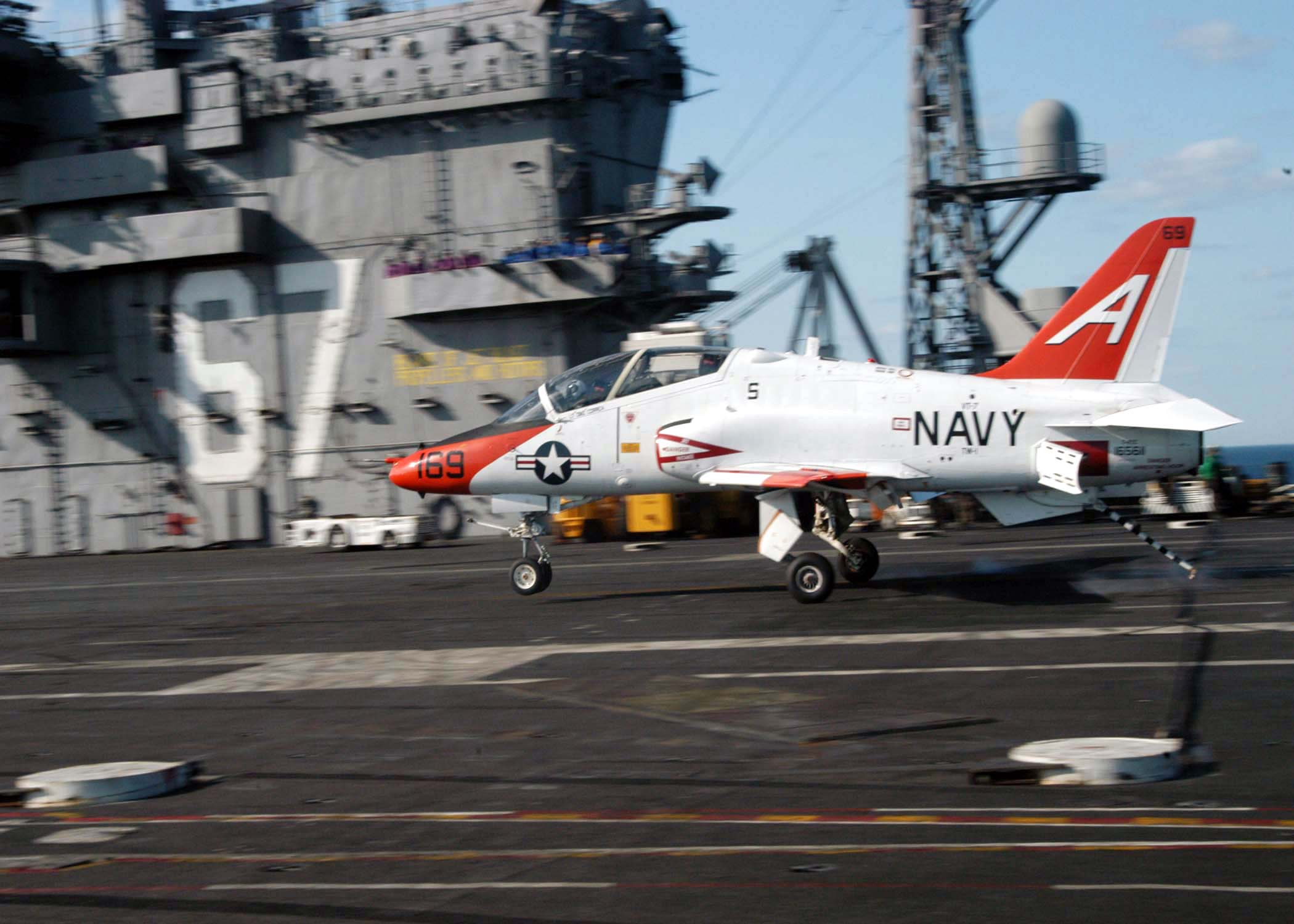
A T-45C from VT-7 practicing carrier qualifications aboard the USS John F. Kennedy (CV-67)

=== Strike Flight Training ===
Students assigned to the strike fighter/jet pathway at NAS Meridian are in VT-7 or VT-9. Total training (known as Strike Flight Curriculum) can last eight to twelve months and begins with classroom instruction in engineering, aerodynamics, flight rules, and instrument navigation. Students also begin training in flight simulators, culminating in an instrument rating. After in-flight instruction begins, students ascend through 21 stages of training, including 160 hours of flight time. Training covers instrument flying, two and four-plane formation flights, night flights, and landing before advancing to low-level navigation, bombing with 25-lbs practice bombs, weapons training, and air combat maneuvering. Students complete Field Carrier Landing Practice at NAS Meridian or Joe Williams Outlying Landing Field (OLF). Strike Flight Curriculum culminates in carrier qualification, during which students make their first arrested landing. After successfully completing ten arrested landings and four touch-and-go landings, students earn their Wings of Gold.

=== E-2/C-2 flight training ===
Students in the E-2/C-2 pathway may complete Advanced Flight Training at NAS Meridian with VT-7 or VT-9 after completing their initial Advanced Flight Training at NAS Corpus Christi. Advanced Flight Training begins with similar classroom training to the Strike Flight Curriculum. Students then advance through fourteen stages of in-flight training, culminating in carrier qualification.

== See also ==
- History of the United States Navy
- List of United States Navy aircraft squadrons
- List of Inactive United States Navy aircraft squadrons
