= North American T-2 Buckeye =

Jet powered Training aircraft

T-2 Buckeye
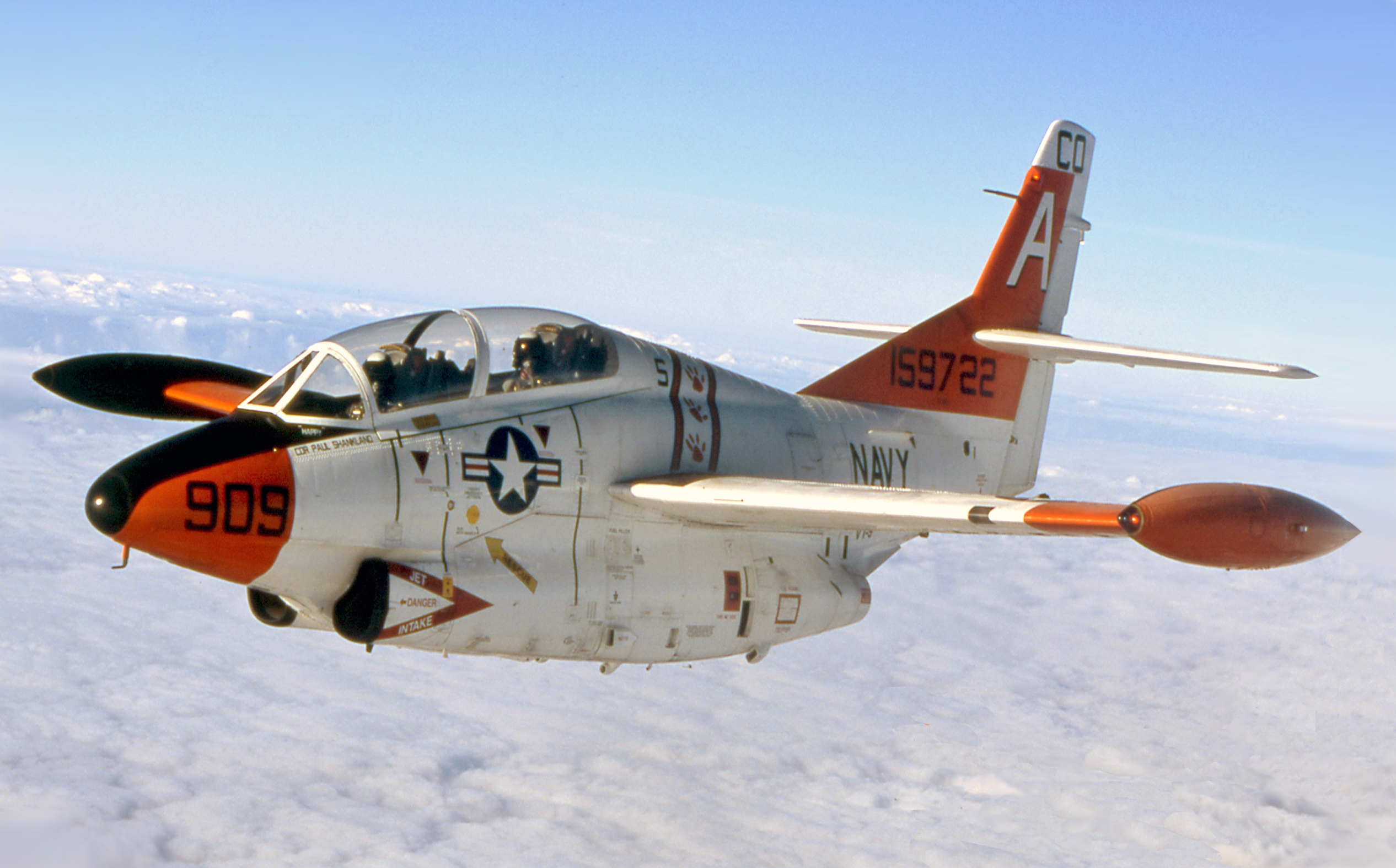
- A T-2C Buckeye from VT-9

General information
- Type: Jet trainer
- National origin: United States
- Manufacturer: North American Aviation; North American Rockwell
- Status: Active service with Hellenic Air Force
- Primary users: United States Navy (historical): Hellenic Air Force; Venezuelan Air Force (historical)
- Number built: 519

History
- Manufactured: 1958–1974
- Introduction date: November 1959
- First flight: 31 January 1958
- Retired: United States Navy 2008

The North American T-2 Buckeye was a turbojet-powered intermediate training aircraft designed and produced by the American aircraft manufacturer North American Aviation. It was primarily operated by the United States Navy (USN).

The T-2 was developed during the 1950s to introduce USN and United States Marine Corps (USMC) student naval aviators and student naval flight officers to operating jet-powered aircraft. Originally designated NA-241, it was selected for procurement via a USN competition in the mid-1956. Several elements of the aircraft, including its unswept wing and controls, were derived from other North American aircraft as to lower the cost of development. The T-2 was a relatively forgiving aircraft to fly and thus was well-suited to being operated by inexperienced pilots.

The prototype T-2 performed its maiden flight on 31 January 1958 and the type entered USN service during the following year. The T-2 promptly replaced several earlier trainers, such as the Lockheed T2V SeaStar, and was produced in several variants for the USN; while the original T-2A was powered by a single Westinghouse J34-WE-46/48 turbojet, subsequent models featured a twin-engine arrangement instead. In addition to the USN, it was also procured by the Hellenic Air Force and Venezuelan Air Force. After 49 years of USN service, the T-2 was withdrawn in 2008, having been replaced by the McDonnell Douglas T-45 Goshawk.

== Design and development ==
In early 1956, the United States Navy (USN) issued a requirement that sought a jet-powered basic trainer to replace its T-28 Trojan piston-engined aircraft. (Note: At the time, primary training for the United States Navy remained the responsibility of the piston-engined Beechcraft T-34 Mentor while the jet-powered Lockheed T2V SeaStar provided more advanced training.) Amongst the companies that opted to respond was North American Aviation, which produced a design internally designated NA-241; North American's submission was selected as the winner in mid-1956.

The aircraft, which was designated T2J-1 by the USN, was a mid-winged monoplane with trainee and instructor sitting in tandem; the rear seat, typically used by the instructor, was raised to provide better visibility over the forward seat, which was normally occupied by the trainee. Accordingly, both the pilot and instructor had an excellent field of vision, and were seated on Martin-Baker ejection seats. The cockpit was both pressurized and air conditioned. The flight characteristics of the T-2, such as its relatively low stall speed, were judged to make the aircraft particularly well suited to performing the trainer mission. As a result of its forgiving flight characteristics, the type was frequently used to train tactical aviators in spin recovery procedures. The T-2's performance has been stated to have between that of the United States Air Force's (USAF) Cessna T-37 Tweet and the USN's TA-4J Skyhawk.

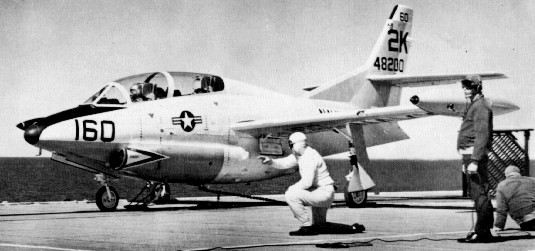
A T-2A of VT-7 on USS Antietam in the early 1960s

The structure of the aircraft's unswept wing, which could not fold, was based on that of the FJ-1 Fury fighter while its control system was based on the T-28C Trojan, both of which reduced the T-2's development cost. It was powered by a single Westinghouse J34-WE-46/48 turbojet, rated to produce 3,400 lbf (15 kN) of thrust. It had fixed wingtip fuel tanks and a tailhook. The T-2 could be catapult-launched, however, this required the use of a special bridle rather than a launch bar. (Note: By the time of its withdrawal, the T-2 was the final aircraft in the USN's inventory that required use of a bridle to be catapult launched.) While it featured no built-in armament, the T2J-1 could accommodate a pair of .50-inch gun pods, 100 lb (45 kg) practice bombs, or 2.75-inch rockets beneath the wings.

The first T2J-1 performed its maiden flight on 31 January 1958, Carrier trials were conducted on board the USS Antietam, which the type completed successfully.

Every T-2 was manufactured by North American at Air Force Plant 85, located just south of Port Columbus Airport in Columbus, Ohio. A total of 609 aircraft were built during the type's production run; the final assembly line was shuttered in December 1974. The name Buckeye refers to the state tree of Ohio, as well as the mascot of Ohio State University; it was selected to honour the state in which the aircraft was manufactured.

== Operational history ==
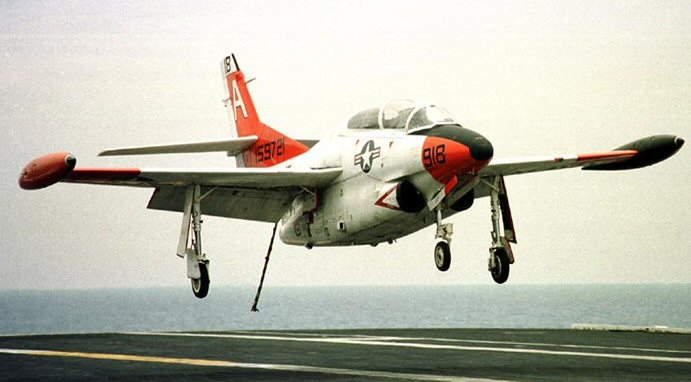
A T-2 about to land, 2004

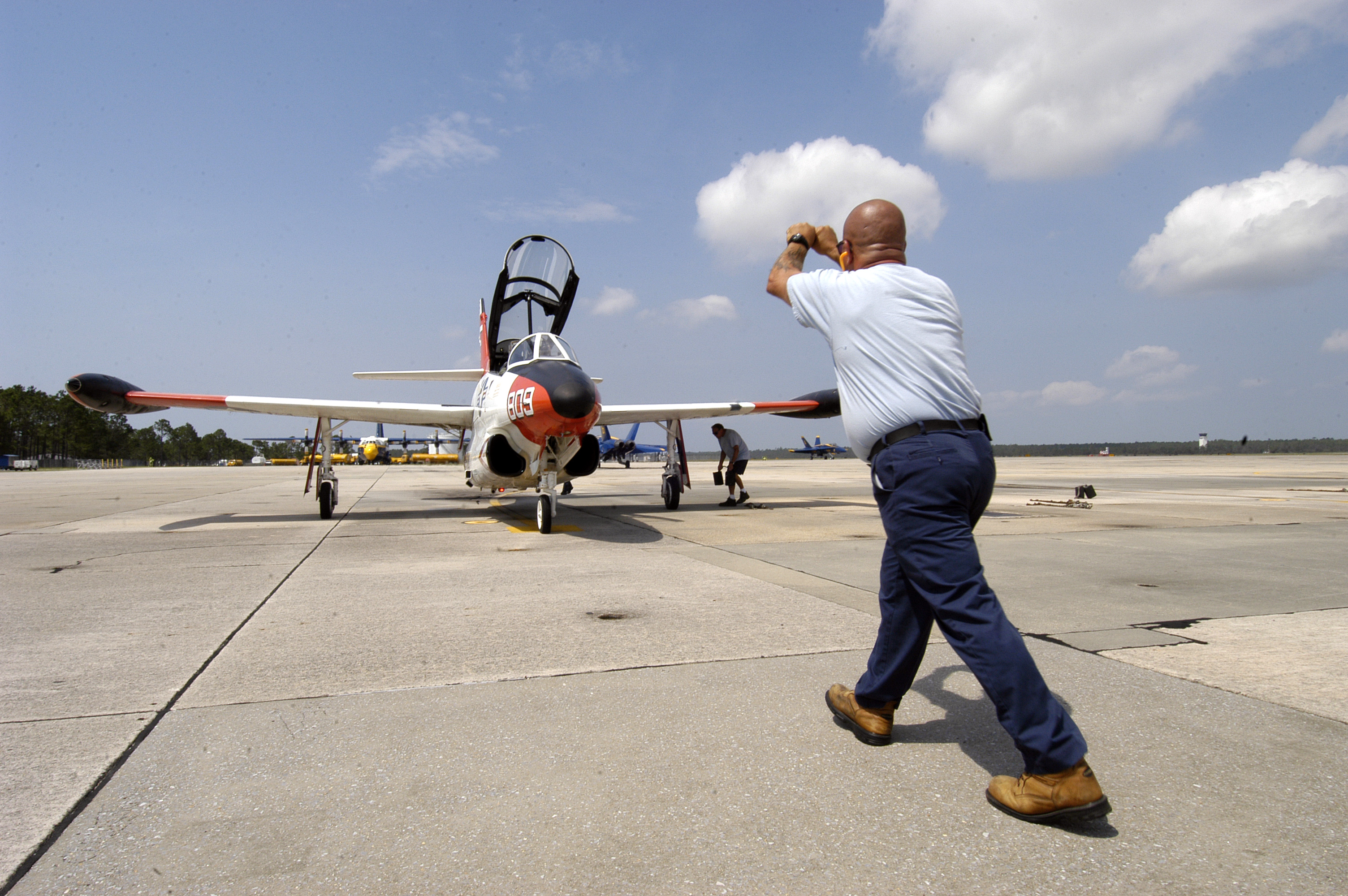
A T-2C being parked at Naval Air Station Pensacola, Florida, on 30 August 2005

During 1959, the T-2 entered USN service with Basic Training Group Seven, later designated as VT-7, at Naval Air Station Meridian. A second training group, VT-9 formed at Meridian in 1961.

The first version of the aircraft entered service in 1959 as the T2J-1; three years later, it was redesignated as T-2A under the joint aircraft designation system. During the 1960s, the aircraft was redesigned into the T-2B, the most substantial change being the replacement of the original single engine configuration for a pair of Pratt & Whitney J60-P-6 turbojets, capable of producing up to 3,000 lbf (13,000 N). The next major revision, the T-2C, was powered by two General Electric J85-GE-4 turbojets, producing 2,950 lbf (13,100 N). The T-2D and T-2E were export versions for the Venezuelan Air Force and Hellenic Air Force, respectively.

The T-2 Buckeye (along with the TF-9J Cougar) replaced the T2V-1/T-1A SeaStar, though the T-1 continued in some uses into the 1970s.

Every jet-qualified Naval Aviator and virtually every Naval Flight Officer from the late 1950s until 2004 received training in the T-2 Buckeye, a length of service spanning over four decades. Starting with the end of the Cold War in the early 1990s, demands on the T-2 fleet diminished substantially; this trend was primarily caused by the introduction of the transonic McDonnell Douglas T-45 Goshawk. (Note: The McDonnell Douglas T-45 Goshawk is a carrier-compatible variant of the BAE Systems Hawk developed specifically for the USN and introduced to service during the early 1990s.)

The withdrawal of the T-2 from USN service was gradual, it first exited the Naval Aviator strike pipeline (where The T-2 performed its final carrier landings) in 2004, and the Naval Flight Officer tactical jet pipeline in 2008. In the Naval Aviator strike pipeline syllabus and the Naval Flight Officer strike and strike fighter pipeline syllabi, the T-2 has been replaced by the T-45, which is more comparable to other high-performance, subsonic trainers, or the supersonic USAF Northrop T-38 Talon. More recently, the T-2 has been used as a director aircraft for aerial drones. Several T-2 Buckeyes, although still retaining their USN markings, are now registered as civilian-owned aircraft with FAA "N" numbers; they regularly appear at airshows.

== Variants ==
T-2A
Two-seat intermediate jet training aircraft, powered by a 3,400-lb (1542-kg) thrust Westinghouse J34-WE-46/48 turbojet, original designation T2J-1 Buckeye, 217 built
YT-2B
Two T-2As were converted into T-2B prototype aircraft.
T-2B
Improved version, it was powered by two 3,000-lb (1360-kg) thrust Pratt & Whitney J60-P-6 turbojets; 97 were built.
YT-2C
One T-2B was converted into a T-2C prototype aircraft.
T-2C
Final production version for the U.S. Navy, it was powered by two 2,950-lbf thrust General Electric J85-GE-4 turbojets; 231 were built.
DT-2B and DT-2C
Small numbers of T-2Bs and T-2Cs were converted into drone directors.
T-2D
Export version for Venezuela, 12 built
T-2E
Export version for Greece, 40 built

== Operators ==
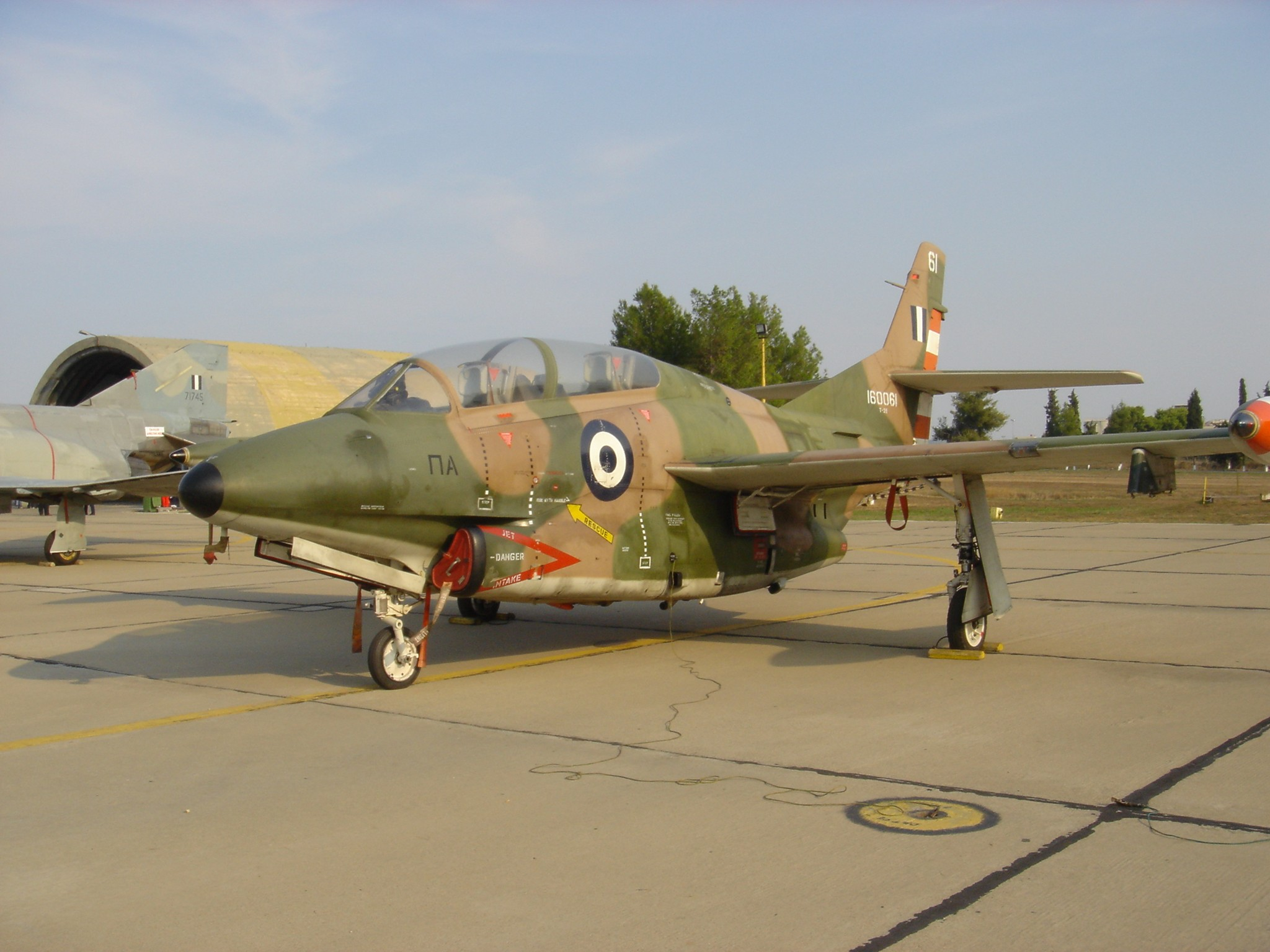
A T-2E Buckeye of the Hellenic Air force.

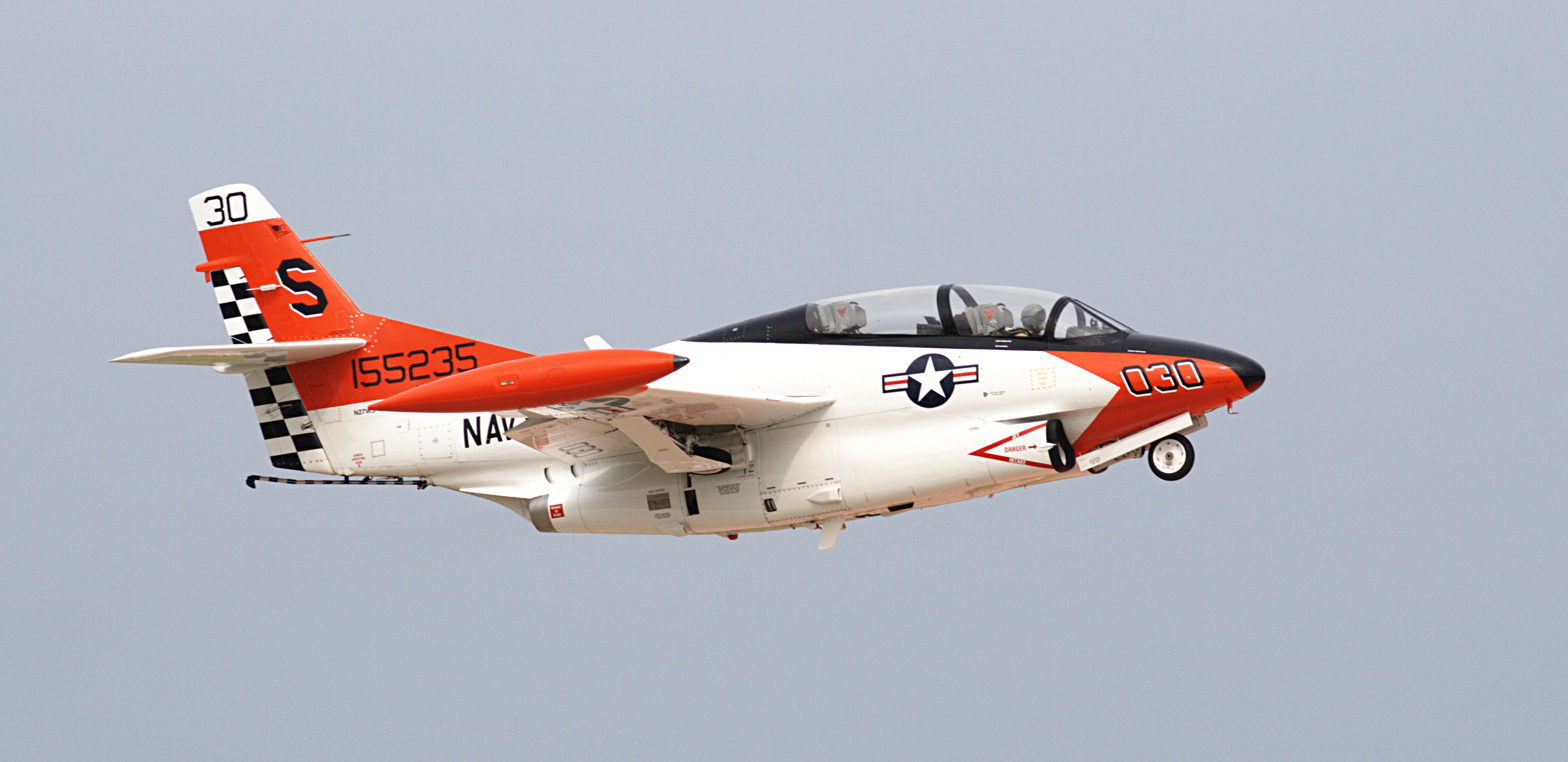
A civilian-operated T-2B Buckeye painted in United States Navy colors

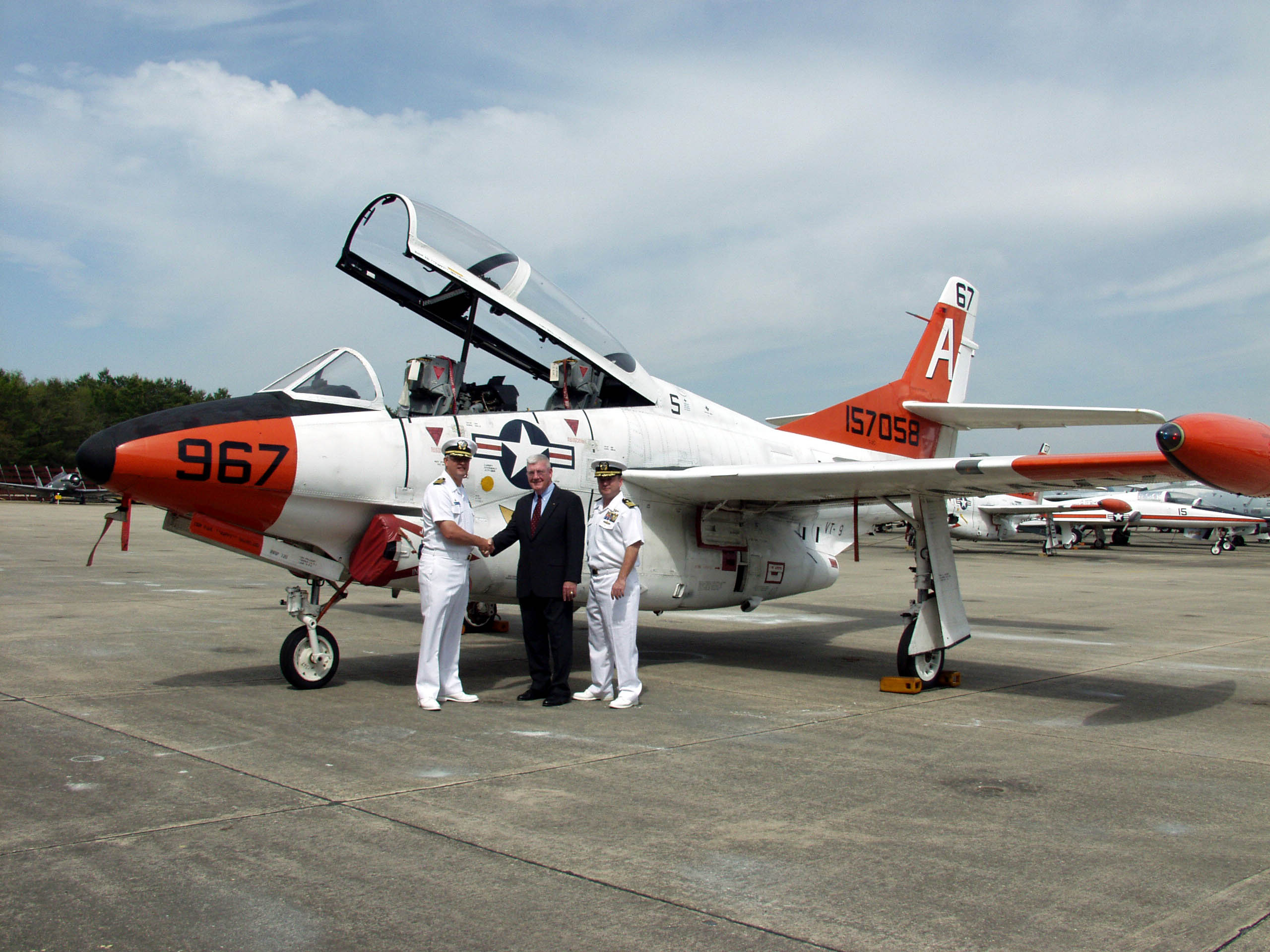
CAPT Dan Ouimette, Commodore of TRAWING ONE, and CDR Paul Shankland, CO of VT-9, present the last T-2C to make a carrier arrested landing to the National Naval Aviation Museum at NAS Pensacola.

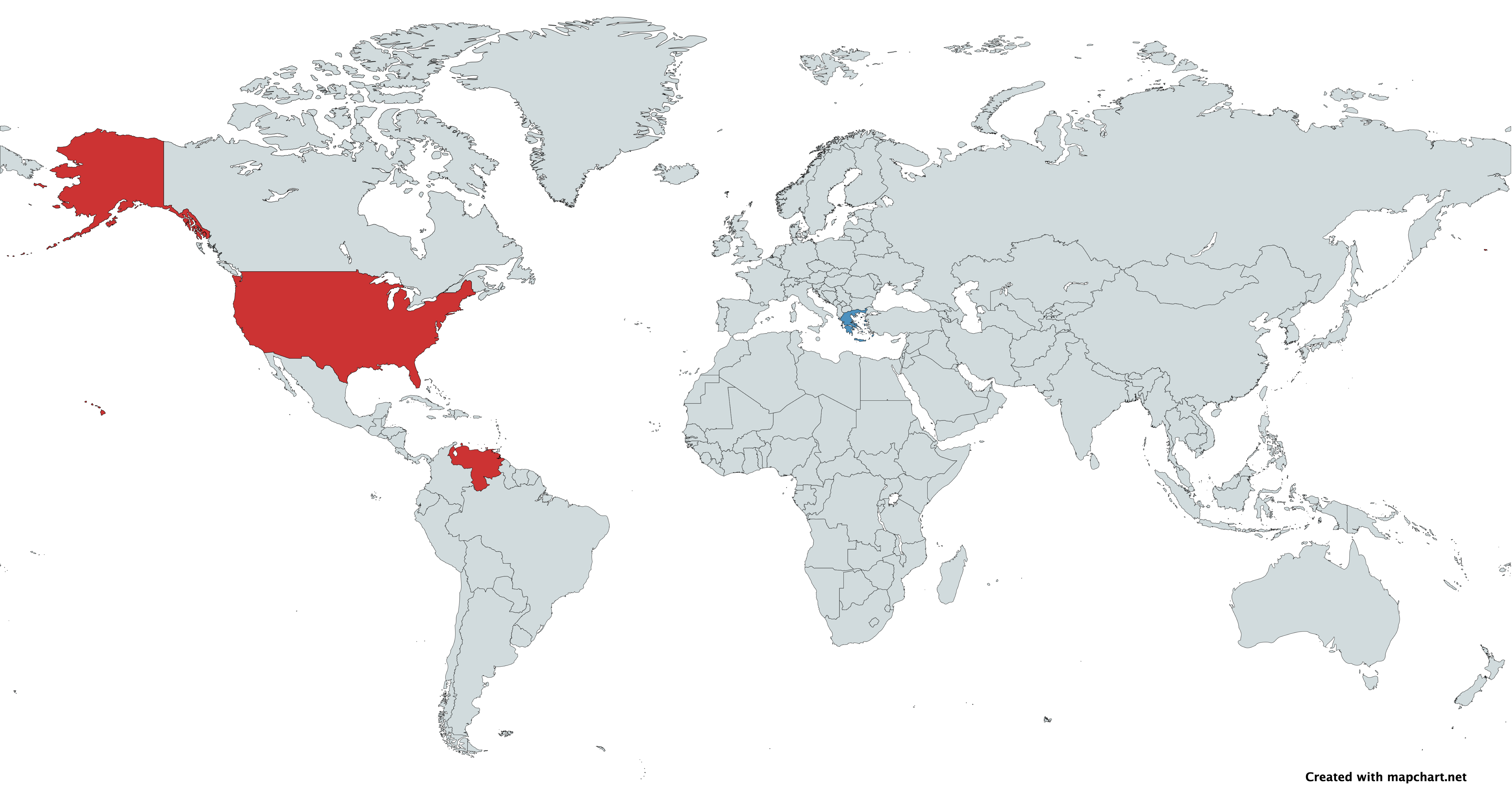
Map with T-2 Buckeye operators in blue and former operators in red

Greece

- Hellenic Air Force

United States

- United States Navy

Venezuela

- Bolivarian Military Aviation

== Aircraft on display ==
- T-2A Bu.147474 North American Buckeye at Planes of Fame Air Museum in Chino Ca.
- T-2A Bu.156697 North American Buckeye on board USS Midway Museum in San Diego Ca.
- T-2C Bu.157050 North American Buckeye at Pima Air & Space Museum in Tucson Az.
- T-2C Bu.158327 North American Buckeye at National Naval Aviation Museum in Pensacola Fl.
- T-2C Bu.158583 North American Buckeye at Grissom Air Museum in Indiana
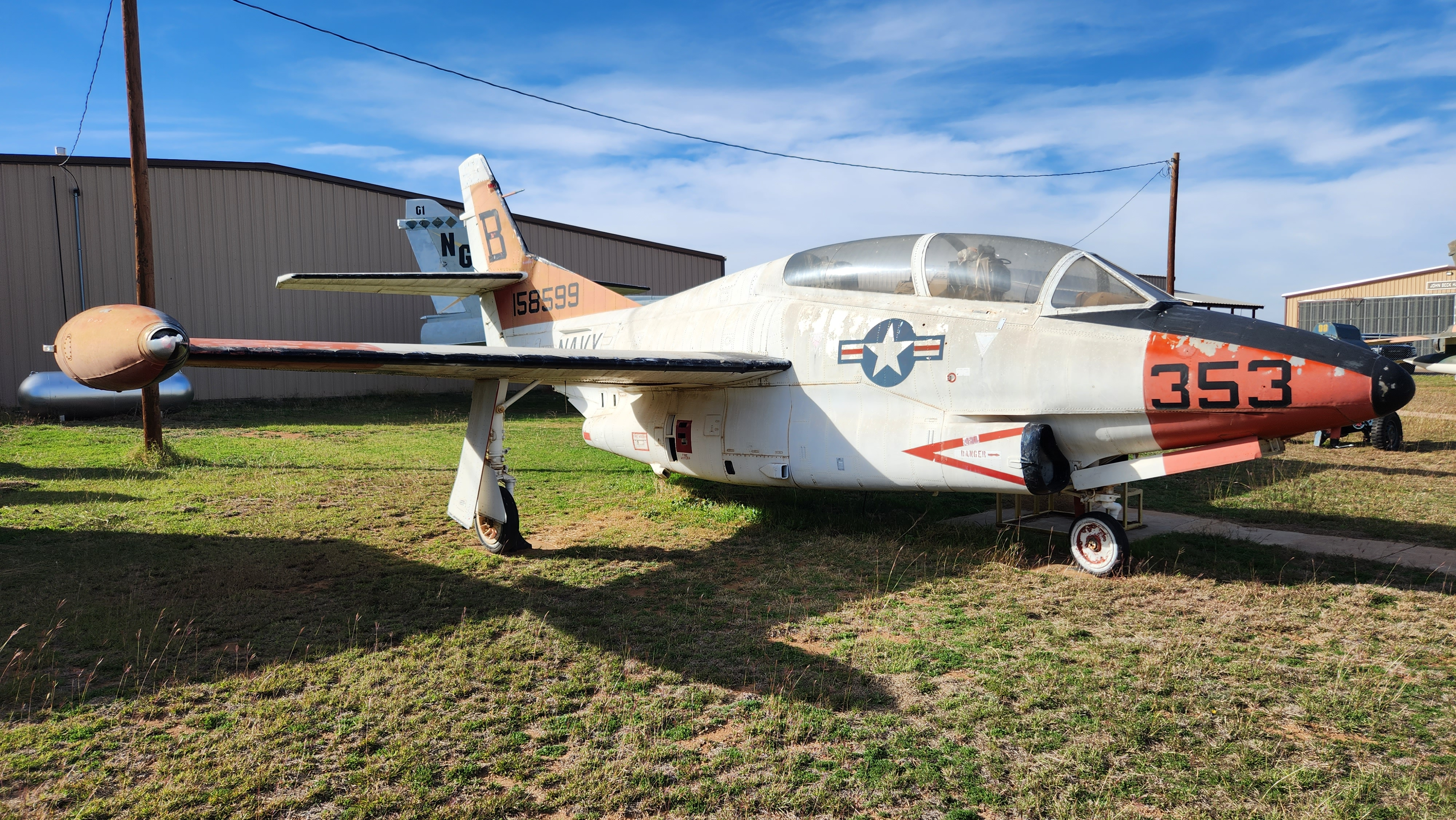
- T-2 Buckeye on display at the Texas Air Museum in Slaton, Texas
  Bu. 158599 North American Buckeye - on static display at the Texas Air Museum in Slaton, Texas on loan from the National Naval Aviation Museum.
- T-2C Bu.158326 North American Buckeye at Veterans Memorial Park in Town of Florida, N.Y.

== Specifications (T-2C Buckeye) ==
Data from Jane's All The World's Aircraft 1976–77.

General characteristics

- Crew: 2
- Length: 38 ft 3 1/2 in (11.67 m)
- Wingspan: 38 ft 1 1/2 in (11.62 m) (over tip tanks)
- Height: 14 ft 9 1/2 in (4.51 m)
- Wing area: 255 sq ft (23.7 m^{2})
- Airfoil: NACA 64A212
- Empty weight: 8,115 lb (3,681 kg)
- Max takeoff weight: 13,179 lb (5,978 kg)
- Fuel capacity: 691 US gal (575 imp gal; 2,620 L) total
- Powerplant: 2 × General Electric J85-GE-4 turbojets, 2,950 lbf (13.1 kN) thrust each

Performance

- Maximum speed: 522 mph (840 km/h, 454 kn) at 25,000 ft (7,600 m)
- Stall speed: 100 mph (160 km/h, 87 kn)
- Range: 1,046 mi (1,683 km, 909 nmi)
- Service ceiling: 40,400 ft (12,300 m)
- Rate of climb: 6,200 ft/min (31 m/s)

== See also ==
Related development

- North American FJ-1 Fury

Aircraft of comparable role, configuration, and era

- Douglas TA-4J Skyhawk
- Fouga CM.175 Zéphyr
- Lockheed T2V SeaStar
- McDonnell Douglas T-45 Goshawk
