= List of T-45 Goshawk losses =

List of US Navy T-45 Goshawk training aircraft losses

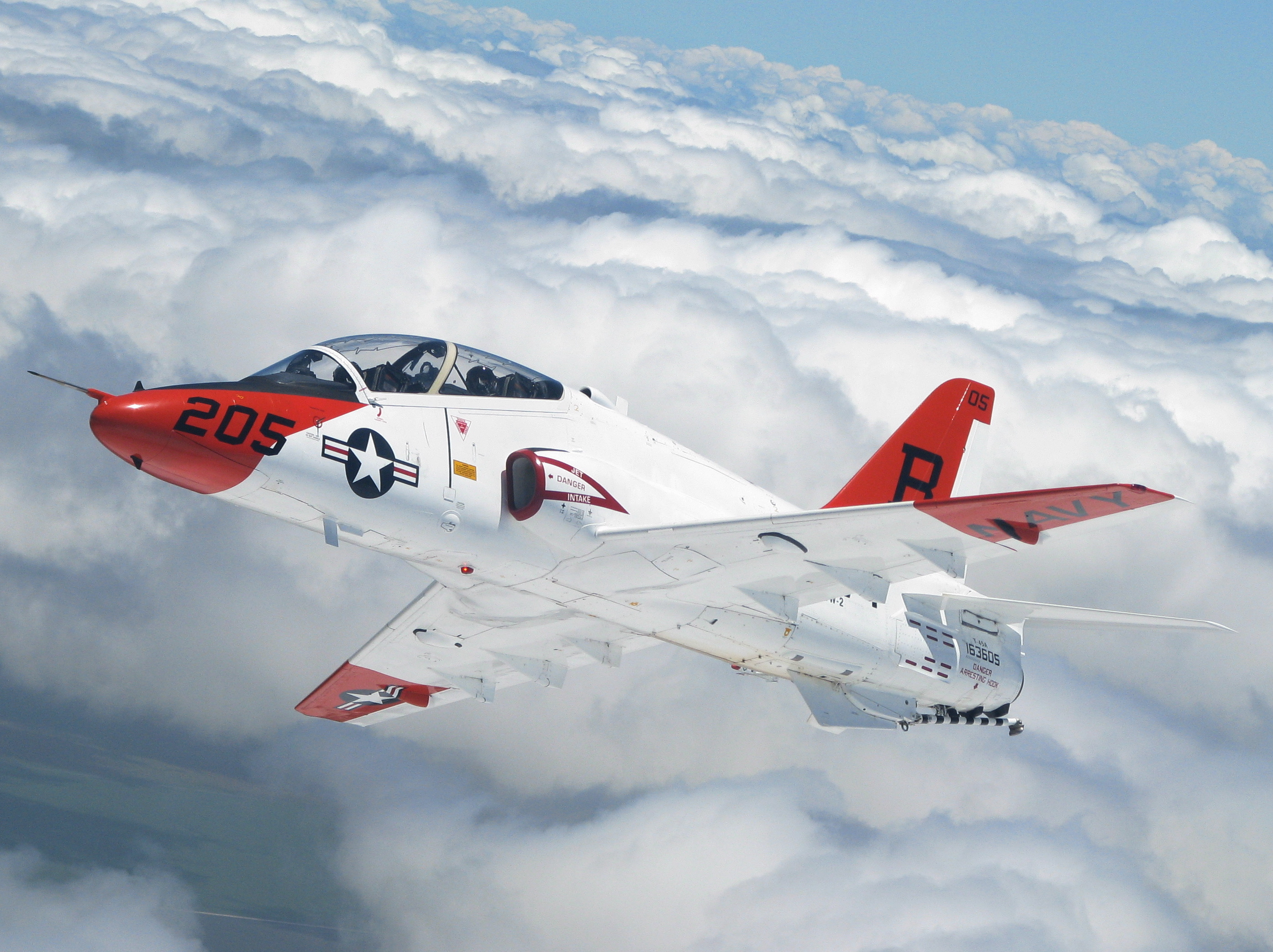
The T-45A in flight

This is a list of T-45 Goshawk losses. As of May 2026, about 34 T-45 Goshawks have been destroyed in accidents, or about 15% of the inventory, at a rate of about one per year. At least seven crew members have suffered fatalities. Seven losses—over 20% of the total losses—have been due to bird strikes, six in Texas (five at Naval Air Station Kingsville) and one in Mississippi.

All accidents listed here resulted in the write-off of the aircraft, unless otherwise noted.

== Accidents and losses ==
=== 1990s ===
- 4 June 1992: The aircraft ran off the runway while landing at Edwards AFB, California
- 17 August 1994: Two Goshawks collided 60 miles (97 km) southwest of NAS Kingsville, Texas. Of the 3 pilots, 1 did not eject, and was killed
- 17 March 1996: Pilot attempted an arrested landing at NAS Cecil Field, Jacksonville, Florida, after two tires had been "bulls-eyed" during launch from the USS John F. Kennedy. The pilot safely ejected as the jet swerved uncontrollably towards the left side of the runway. The plane departed the runway, and flipped over, crushing the canopy.
- 1 November 1996: Pilots ejected after a bird strike caused a catastrophic engine failure while in a night landing pattern at NAS Kingsville, Texas. The student was seriously injured when ejected through the canopy due to a jettison failure.
- 15 April 1997: Sole pilot ejected after a bird strike caused a catastrophic engine failure on approach to NAS Kingsville, Texas
- 11 December 1997: The aircraft splashed after launch from the USS Enterprise off the coast of Georgia, sole pilot rescued
- 19 August 1998: The aircraft crashed while attempting a landing on the USS John F. Kennedy 70 miles (110 km) off Jacksonville, Florida, student pilot killed

=== 2000s ===
- 21 February 2001: Two pilots were killed while performing safety observer duties 1 mile (1.6 km) from the USS Dwight D. Eisenhower, off Mayport, Florida
- 24 February 2004: Student pilot crashed onto the runway at NAS Meridian, Mississippi, during touch-and-go landing, survived
- 12 July 2004: A student pilot ran off the runway during landing at NAS Meridian, Mississippi, ejected and survived
- 22 March 2005: The aircraft crashed while turning in the landing pattern during a field carrier landing practice flight at NAS Meridian, Mississippi, the lone pilot was killed
- 11 May 2005: The aircraft crashed on approach to NAS Kingsville, Texas, sole pilot ejected safely
- 27 October 2005: The aircraft crashed at NAS Kingsville, Texas, not fatal
- 31 October 2005: A Goshawk crashed 1.5 miles (2.4 km) northeast of NAS Kingsville, Texas, both pilots ejected with minor injuries
- 27 September 2007: The aircraft crashed about 13 miles (21 km) west of NAS Kingsville, Texas, after a bird strike, student pilot ejected with minor injuries
- 1 October 2007: The aircraft crashed 2 miles (3.2 km) north of NAS Kingsville, Texas, after a bird strike, both pilots safely ejected
- 4 March 2008: Two pilots ejected while on approach to NAS Meridian, Mississippi, after declaring an emergency
- 20 May 2008: Two pilots ejected during a touch and go landing at NAS Meridian, Mississippi, after a technical failure

=== 2010s ===
- 10 June 2010: The aircraft ran off the end of the runway at NAS Kingsville, Texas, the sole pilot safely ejected but the aircraft was not written off
- 29 December 2010: Two pilots ejected with minor injuries 14 miles (23 km) southeast of Tallahassee Regional Airport after major problems developed
- 15 June 2011: The aircraft crashed about 55 miles (89 km) northwest of NAS Kingsville, Texas, student pilot ejected with minor injuries
- 2 November 2011: The aircraft crashed shortly after takeoff from NAS Kingsville, Texas, both pilots ejected safely, aircraft not written off
- 30 May 2012: A Goshawk crashed in a rural area of Brooks County 42 miles (68 km) southwest of NAS Kingsville, Texas, both pilots ejected safely
- 4 November 2013: A Goshawk crashed on the runway at NAS Pensacola, Florida. while landing, both pilots were injured
- 22 May 2015: The aircraft overran the runway at NAS North Island, San Diego, California, and crashed into the water, pilot ejected safely
- 14 August 2016: The aircraft crashed 17 miles (27 km) southwest of NAS Kingsville during a night instrument flight, both pilots ejected safely, one with minor injuries
- 7 September 2016: The aircraft crashed after a technical malfunction, both pilots ejected safely
- 17 January 2017: The Goshawk crashed on the runway at NAS Meridian, Mississippi, after a bird strike, both pilots ejected safely
- 1 October 2017: Two pilots were killed in a crash of a Goshawk near Tellico Plains, Tennessee. Investigators blamed aggressive and unsafe behaviors by the instructor pilot and the student naval aviator.
- 10 May 2019: Both pilots ejected with minor injuries after engine failure on takeoff at NAS Kingsville, Texas

=== 2020s ===
Head-up display video of the 19 September 2021 T-45C crash near Naval Air Station Joint Reserve Base Fort Worth

- 24 March 2021: A T-45C crashed approximately 3 miles (4.8 km) northeast of Naval Outlying Field Orange Grove, Texas with no fatalities after an unforeseeable hydraulic failure.
- 17 May 2021: Two Goshawks collided in midair over Ricardo, Texas. One plane landed safely, the two pilots of the other aircraft ejected safely, one with minor injuries.
- 19 September 2021: A T-45C crashed into a residential neighborhood in Lake Worth, Texas, about 2 miles (3.2 km) away from NAS JRB Fort Worth, damaging at least 3 homes and injuring 5, including the student pilot and instructor. One pilot became entangled in power lines. It was later determined that the jet experienced a bird strike while on approach.
- 17 August 2022: A Goshawk crashed into an empty field, following a bird strike, while on approach to NAS Kingsville, Texas. The single crew member, an instructor, safely ejected.
- 12 April 2024: A Goshawk made a precautionary landing at Hesler-Noble Field in Laurel, Mississippi after an engine malfunction, following which all T-45 flights were paused.
- 26 May 2026: Two pilots ejected safely from a Goshawk which crashed into farmland in Noxubee County, Mississippi.
