= VT-9 =

Training Squadron 9
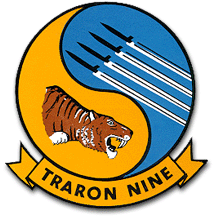
- VT-9 Logo
- Country: United States of America
- Branch: United States Navy
- Type: Training
- Nickname: Tigers

Commanders
- Current commander: CDR Nathan White

Aircraft flown
- Trainer: McDonnell Douglas T-45 Goshawk

The VT-9 Tigers is one of four U.S. Navy strike jet training squadrons and one of two based at Naval Air Station Meridian in Mississippi (the other two being based at Naval Air Station Kingsville in Texas).

== History ==
Training Squadron NINE (VT-9) is the third squadron, and second training squadron, to be designated VT-9. The first VT-9 was established in 1927 as Torpedo Squadron NINE flying the Curtiss T-3M Convertible Land/Seaplane. The first Training Squadron NINE was established on 15 December 1961 at McCain Field, U.S. Naval Air Station, Meridian, Mississippi flying the T2J-1 Buckeye and calling themselves the "Tigers" when they were split out of Training Squadron SEVEN (VT-7). In September 1962 the squadron's aircraft were redesignated to T-2A by the 1962 United States Tri-Service aircraft designation system. In 1969 the squadron was the first to upgrade to the T-2C Buckeye.

On 2 August 1971, the second and current Training Squadron NINE was established as Training Squadron NINETEEN (VT-19) "Frogs" when it was split out of the first Training Squadron NINE forming two "sister" squadrons, the original Training Squadron NINE and the new Training Squadron NINETEEN. Both squadrons then assumed the intermediate jet training role at Meridian in the T-2C Buckeye. The first Training Squadron NINE was disestablished in July 1987 and its aircraft and personnel were consolidated into VT-19. On 1 October 1998, VT-19 was re-designated VT-9 (becoming the second Training Squadron to use the VT-9 designation) and assumed the name "Tigers" from the original Training Squadron NINE. In June 2004, the squadron completed the last Student Naval Aviator flight in the T-2C "Buckeye" and completed its transition to the T-45C Goshawk.

== Mission ==
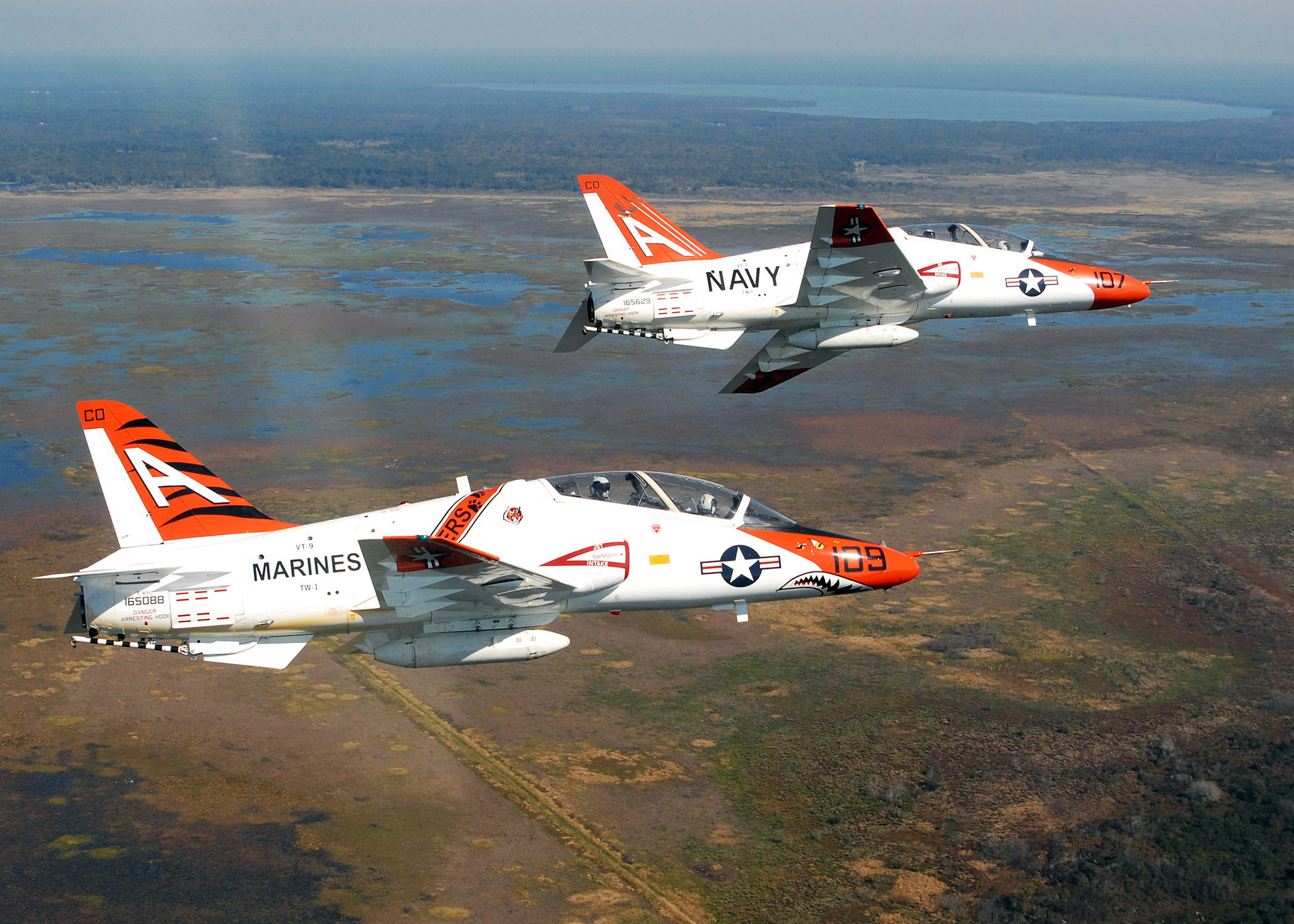
Two T-45Cs from VT-9

U.S. Navy and Marine Student Naval Aviators are trained by the Tigers, along with aviators of the British, Spanish and Italian Navies. The squadron flies the T-45C Goshawk, a U.S. Naval derivative of the British BAE Hawk jet aircraft. The students, selected from the very top performing students graduated from primary flight training in the T-6B, are trained in the T-45C over a 12 month long syllabus consisting of systems, weapons, aerodynamics, emergency procedures, and other academic course-work; dynamic simulator training; navigation and instrument flying, and progress through extensive formation and tactical flying, low-level navigation, bombing, and air combat maneuvering ("dog fighting"). Student Naval Aviators normally complete the syllabus by performing a series of scrutinized arrested landings on an aircraft carrier. The syllabus is high-paced, difficult, and highly competitive; notable training attrition is expected. With this tailhook prerequisite complete, graduating students become "winged Naval Aviators", and then move on to fly a fighter-attack jet or E-2 Airborne Early Warning, with additional post-winging training in Fleet Replacement Squadrons of their respective service.

== See also ==
- History of the United States Navy
- List of United States Navy aircraft squadrons
- List of Inactive United States Navy aircraft squadrons
