= Naval Air Station Meridian =

US Navy training base in Mississippi

- McCain Field
- Near Meridian, Mississippi in the United States
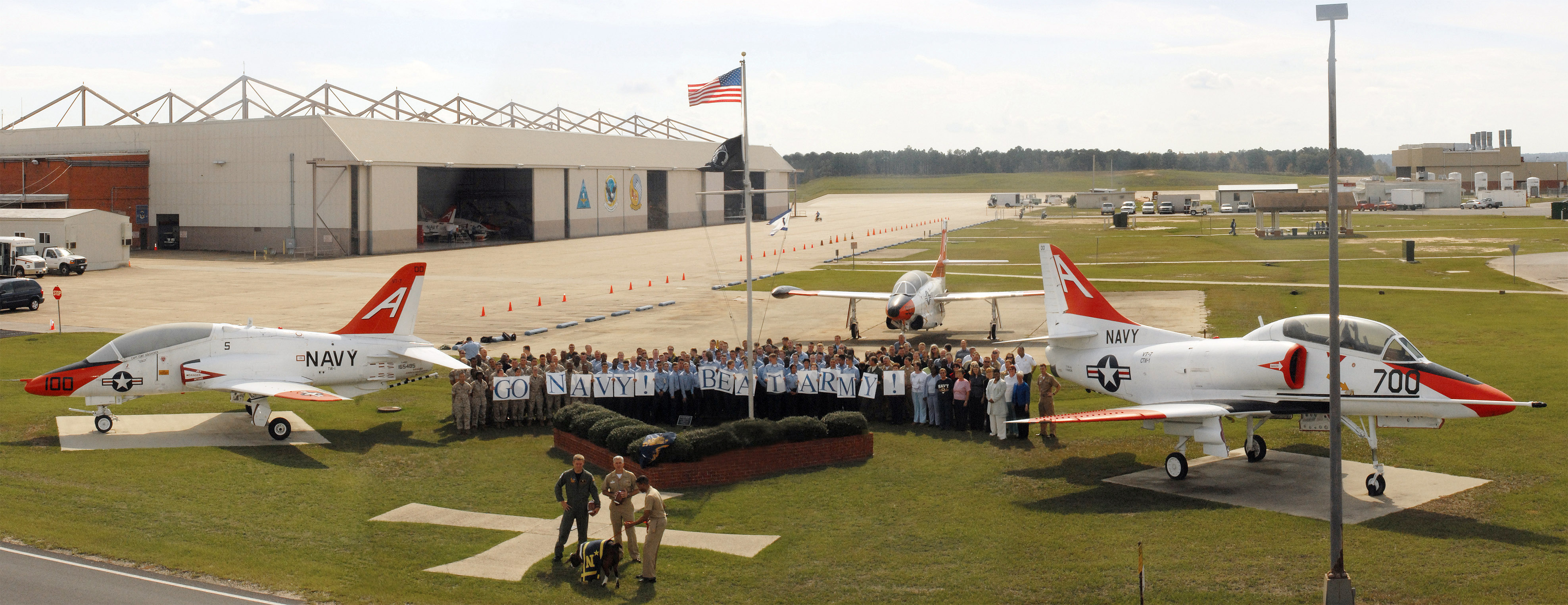
- Personnel standing in formation for a television broadcast at NAS Meridian

Site information
- Type: Naval Air Station
- Owner: Department of Defense
- Operator: US Navy
- Controlled by: Navy Region Southeast
- Condition: Operational
- Website: Official website

Location
- Location in the United States
- Coordinates: 32°33′07″N 88°33′20″W

Site history
- Built: 1957– 1961 (as Naval Auxiliary Air Station)
- In use: 1961 – present

Garrison information
- Current commander: Captain Sylvester R. Foley IV
- Garrison: Training Air Wing One

Airfield information
- Identifiers: ICAO: KNMM, FAA LID: NMM, WMO: 722345
- Elevation: 96.3 metres (316 ft) AMSL
Runways
Direction	Length and surface
1L/19R	2,439.3 metres (8,003 ft) Concrete
1R/19L	2,438.7 metres (8,001 ft) Concrete
10/28	1,951.3 metres (6,402 ft) Concrete

Naval Air Station Meridian or NAS Meridian (ICAO: KNMM, FAA LID: NMM) is a military airport located 11 miles northeast of Meridian, Mississippi in Lauderdale County and Kemper County, and is one of the Navy's two jet strike pilot training facilities.

== History ==
On July 16, 1957, the first shovel of earth was thrown, marking the beginning of the Naval Auxiliary Air Station (NAAS), which was commissioned July 19, 1961. Captain W.F. Krantz, USN received the golden key to the air station, and senior Mississippi U.S. Senator John C. Stennis was the guest speaker for the ceremony that opened the $60 million base. At that time, the operations area was named McCain Field in honor of the late Admiral John S. McCain, Sr. of Teoc, Mississippi.

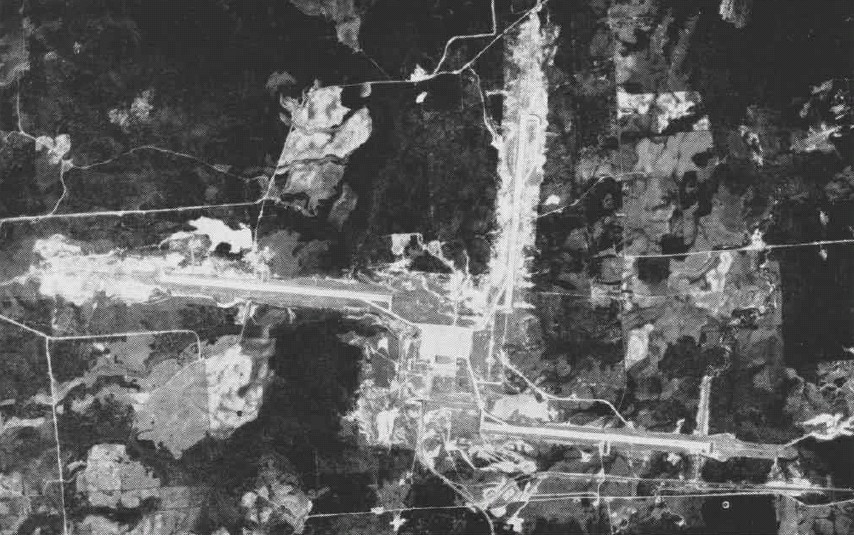
Aerial view of NAS Meridian in the early 1960s. Top is East.

Training Squadron SEVEN (VT-7) arrived at NAAS Meridian July 12, 1961, then split to form its sister squadron, Training Squadron NINE (VT-9) on December 15. In September 1965, hundreds of planes from Florida bases arrived to escape the wrath of Hurricane Betsy. The Naval Auxiliary Air Station continued to grow, and by July 1968, the station became a full Naval Air Station. The years brought an increase in building development and family housing units. In 1968, and again in 1969, 300 aircraft from Naval Air Station Pensacola, Florida arrived to escape the fury and destruction of Hurricane Gladys and Hurricane Camille, respectively.

In August 1971, Training Air Wing ONE (TRAWING ONE) was commissioned and Training Squadron NINETEEN (VT-19) was also established. The Wing motto became "Readiness for Victory at Sea through Training." That October saw the arrival of the TA-4J, the new advanced jet trainer based on the A-4 "Skyhawk." In April 1973, President Richard M. Nixon, accompanied by Senator John C. Stennis and many other high-ranking military and civilian officials, attended the dedication of the new Naval Technical Training Center (NTTC). Known locally as the Stennis Center, it was officially commissioned April 17, 1974.

NAS Meridian was selected and upgraded to a Major Shore Command on October 1, 1982. In March 1984, NAS Meridian was one of 15 installations chosen for the Department of Defense Model Installation Program. In September 1985, the enlisted galley was dedicated to the memory of Marine Lance Corporal Roy M. Wheat, a Mississippi native and Medal of Honor recipient who was killed in Vietnam.

== Current operations ==
NAS Meridian supports aviation and technical training, and other tenant activities. Departments working under the NAS commanding officer form the backbone for the entire installation's functioning. The Administrative Services Department provides general administrative services for the command. Responsibilities include: processing military personnel matters with the Personnel Support Activity Detachment, Meridian; processing special requests, leave and TAD orders, evaluations and command correspondence; maintaining command directives and correspondence files; providing duplicating services and messenger systems; and coordinating administrative systems and services throughout the command.

The Air Operations Department employs 230 military and civilian personnel to operate NAS Meridian/McCain Field and Naval Outlying Landing Field (NOLF) Joe Williams. Their primary mission is to support Commander, Training Air Wing ONE, the wing's subordinate training squadrons and its associated T-45 Goshawk aircraft in the conduct of undergraduate strike pilot training. Additional services are furnished to support operations for NAS and transient military aircrews. Air Traffic Control Division operates the control tower and radar final control systems. They provide flight planning services and issue clearances and instructions to pilots for all phases of military flight operations within the vicinity of the airport. Ground Electronics Maintenance Division (GEMD) ensures all assigned UHF, VHF and FM radio communications, air navigation aids, weather monitoring/reporting equipment and precision approach radars required to conduct safe and effective flight operations around NAS Meridian and its outlying field operate at or above designated performance standards. GEMD also provides sound support services and functions as point of contact for matters related to 3M, frequency management, equipment configuration and computer repair/assistance.

NAS Meridian maintains a separate runway, Joe Williams Outlying Landing Field (OLF), approximately 25 miles northwest of the main air station. Joe Williams OLF is an 8,000 foot long runway located in a rural area between the communities of Bogue Chitto and De Kalb. The field is used to reduced traffic congestion at the main air station, primarily when students are conducting Field Carrier Landing Practice in preparation for initial aircraft carrier qualification.

HH-1N Huey helicopters were formerly used by the station's Search and Rescue personnel to provide 24-hour rescue coverage of the Eastern Mississippi/Western Alabama area. The 25-member SAR team consisted of pilots, aircrewmen and hospital corpsmen who were trained in first aid, helicopter rappelling and tree extraction. The team also assisted in a wide variety of civilian emergencies, such as searching for missing persons, assisting with aircraft and boating mishaps and occasional MEDEVAC missions.

== Tenant units ==
- Training Air Wing One
  - Training Squadron 7 (VT-7)
  - Training Squadron 9 (VT-9)
- Naval Technical Training Center (NTTC)
- Marine Aviation Training Support Squadron One (MATSS-1)

== See also ==
- List of T-45 Goshawk losses
- List of United States Navy airfields
- Meridian Station, Mississippi – census-designated place covering the residential portion of the base
