= Lockheed T2V SeaStar =

US carrier-capable jet trainer

T2V-1 / T-1 SeaStar
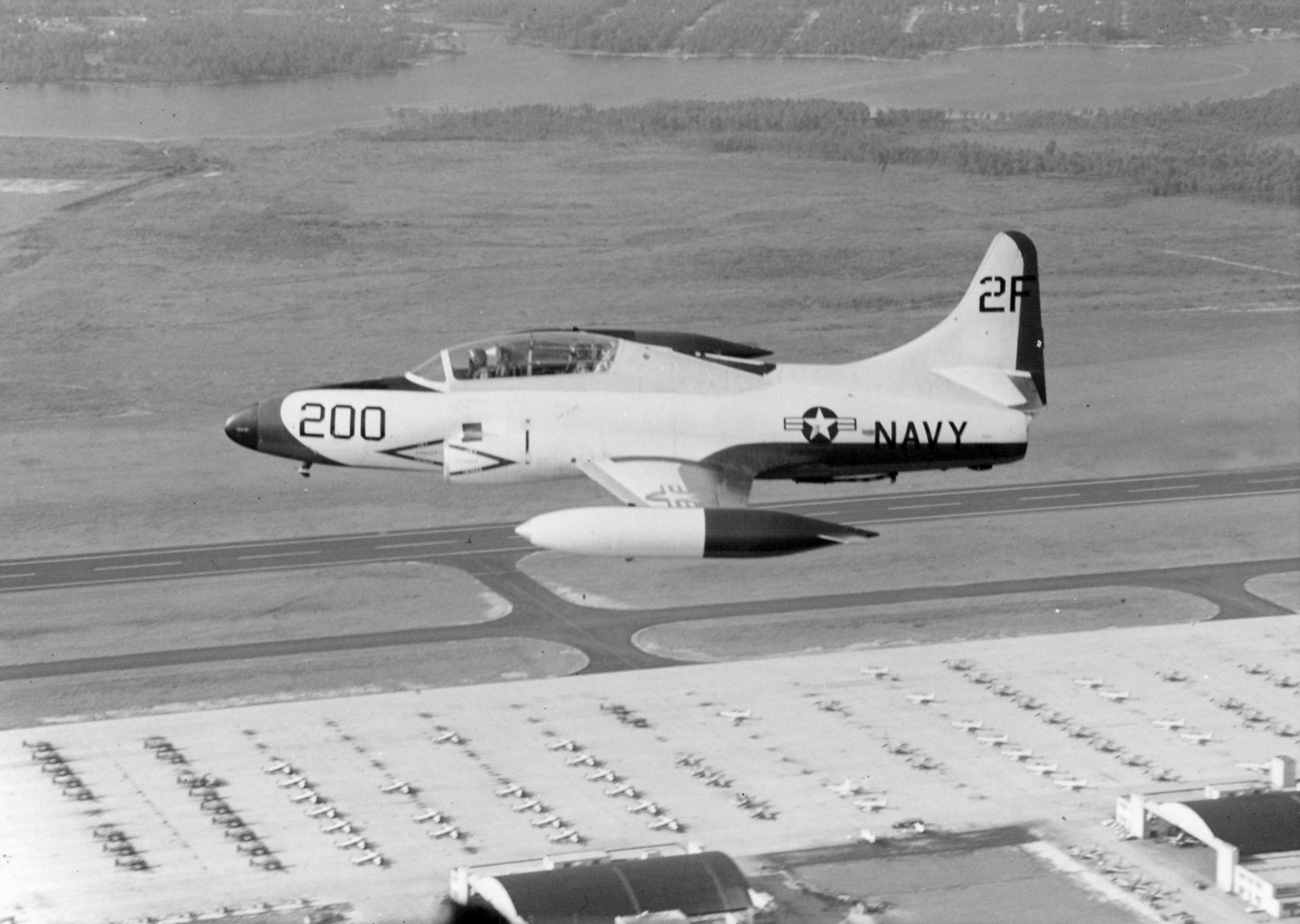
- Lockheed T-1A Seastar in 1959

General information
- Type: carrier-capable trainer
- Manufacturer: Lockheed
- Primary user: United States Navy
- Number built: 150

History
- Introduction date: May 1957
- First flight: 15 December 1953
- Retired: 1970s
- Developed from: Lockheed T-33

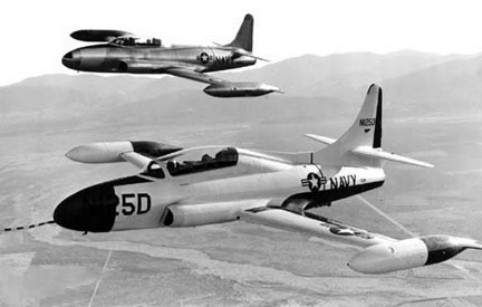
A T2V-1 (T-1A) SeaStar (foreground) and a TV-2 (T-33B) Shooting Star in flight in 1954

The Lockheed T2V SeaStar, later called the T-1 SeaStar, is a carrier-capable jet trainer for the United States Navy that entered service in May 1957. Developed from the Lockheed T-33 (itself derived from the Lockheed P-80 Shooting Star), it was powered by one Allison J33 engine.

== Design and development ==
Starting in 1949, the U.S. Navy used the Lockheed T-33 for land-based jet aircraft training. The T-33 was a derivative of the Lockheed P-80/F-80 fighter and was first named TO-2, then TV-2 in Navy service. However, the TV-2 was not suitable for operation from aircraft carriers. The persisting need for a carrier-compatible trainer led to a further, more advanced design development of the P-80/T-33 family, which came into being with the Lockheed designation L-245 and USN designation T2V. Lockheed's demonstrator L-245 first flew on 16 December 1953 and production deliveries to the US Navy began in 1956.

Compared to the T-33/TV-2, the T2V was almost totally re-engineered for carrier landings and at-sea operations with a redesigned tail, naval standard avionics, a strengthened undercarriage (with catapult fittings) and lower fuselage (with a retractable arrestor hook), power-operated leading-edge flaps (to increase lift at low speeds) to allow carrier launches and recoveries, and an elevated rear (instructor's) seat for improved instructor vision, among other changes. Unlike other P-80 derivatives, the T2V could withstand the shock of landing on a pitching carrier deck and had a much higher ability to withstand sea water-related aircraft wear from higher humidity and salt exposure.

== Operational history ==
The only version of the T2V was initially designated T2V-1 when it entered service, but was redesignated T-1A SeaStar under the 1962 United States Tri-Service aircraft designation system, the designation under which it would spend the majority of its career.

The T-1A was replaced by the North American T-2 Buckeye but remained in service into the 1970s.

== Operators ==
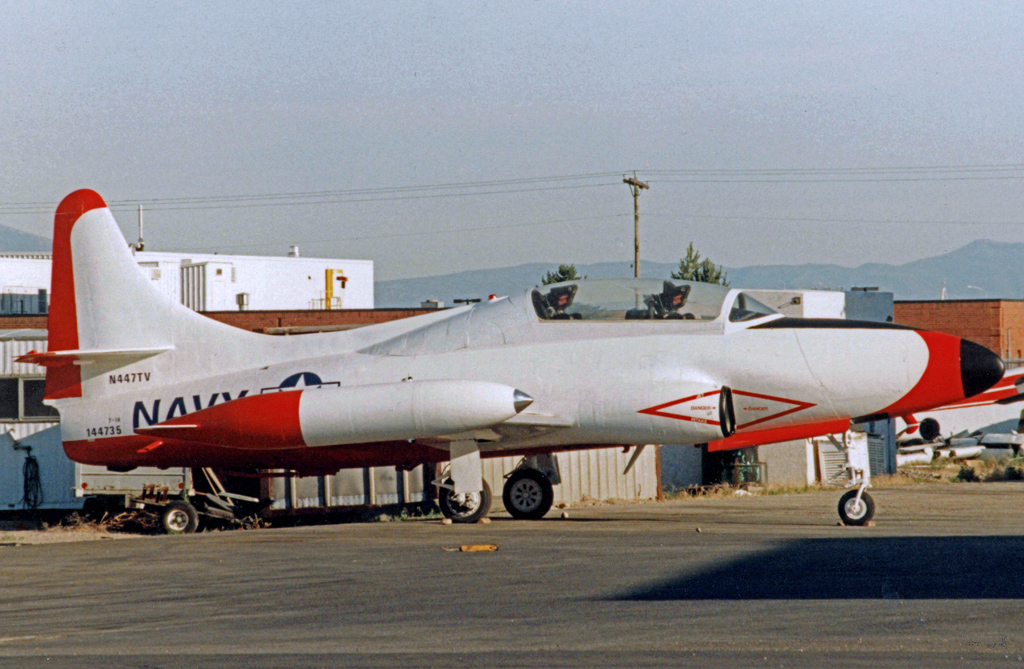
T-1 Seastar in airworthy condition at Salt Lake City Airport in 1994. Still operational in 2011.

United States

- United States Navy
- United States Marine Corps

== Surviving aircraft ==
As of 2017, one T2V-1A airworthy, based at Phoenix-Mesa Gateway Airport (former Williams Air Force Base) in Mesa, Arizona, and being flown for experimental and display purposes. Two examples are preserved on public display in Tucson, Arizona.

== Specifications (T2V-1) ==
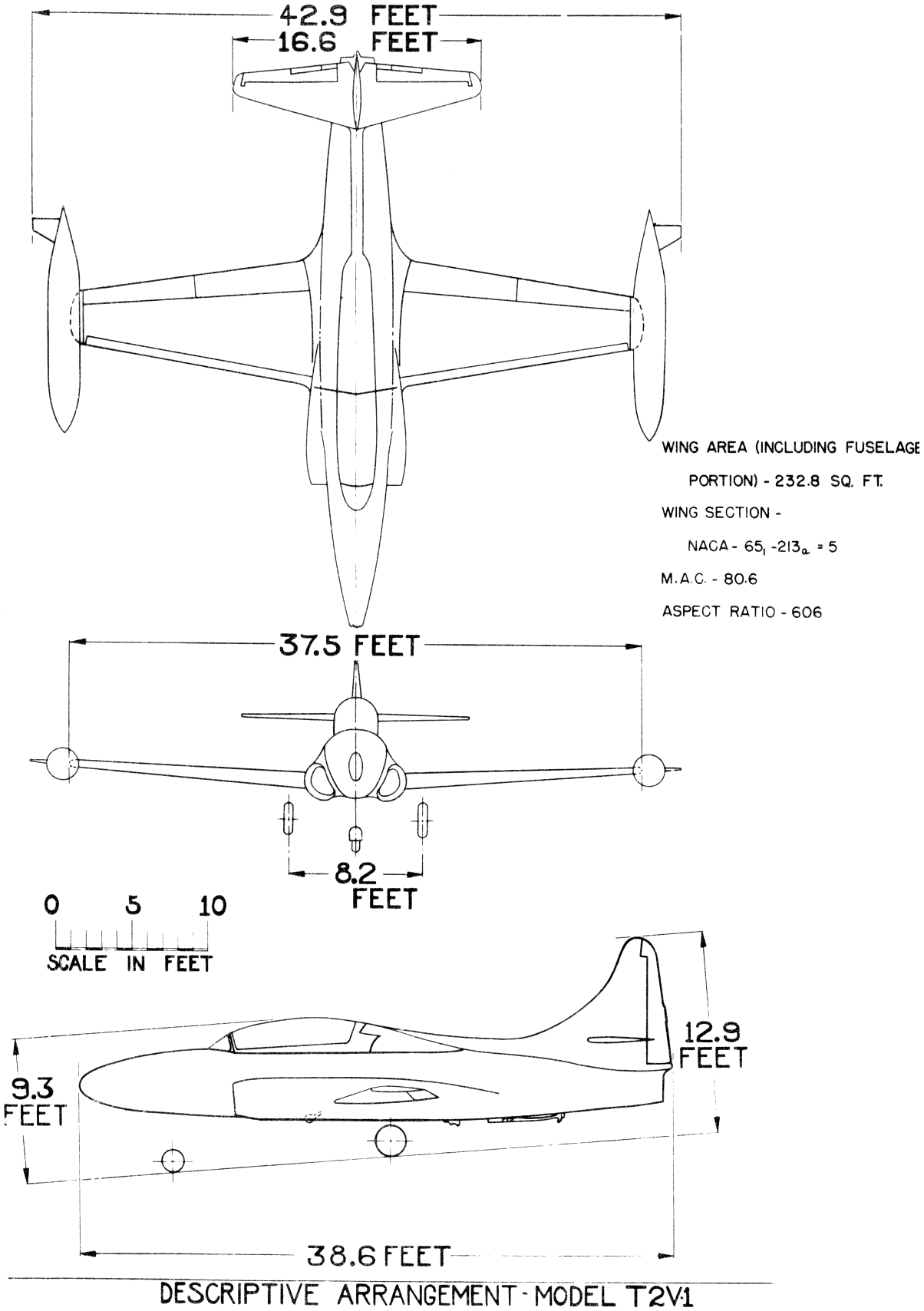
3-view line drawing of the Lockheed T2V-1 Seastar

Data from Lockheed Aircraft since 1913

General characteristics

- Crew: Two (student & instructor)
- Length: 38 ft 6.5 in (11.75 m)
- Wingspan: 42 ft 10 in (13.06 m)
- Height: 13 ft 4 in (4.06 m)
- Wing area: 240 sq ft (22.3 m^{2})
- Empty weight: 11,965 lb (5,427 kg)
- Gross weight: 15,500 lb (7,031 kg)
- Max takeoff weight: 16,800 lb (7,636 kg)
- Powerplant: 1 × Allison J33-A-24/24A turbojet, 6,100 lbf (27 kN) thrust

Performance

- Maximum speed: 580 mph (933 km/h, 504 kn) at 35,000 ft (10,670 m)
- Range: 970 mi (1,560 km, 843 nmi)
- Service ceiling: 40,000 ft (12,190 m)
- Rate of climb: 6,330 ft/min (32 m/s)

== See also ==
Related development

- Lockheed T-33
- Lockheed P-80 Shooting Star

Aircraft of comparable role, configuration, and era

- Douglas TA-4 Skyhawk
- Fouga CM.175 Zéphyr
- Grumman F9F-8T Cougar
- North American T-2 Buckeye
