= McDonnell Douglas T-45 Goshawk =

US carrier-based military training aircraft developed from British BAE Hawk

T-45 Goshawk
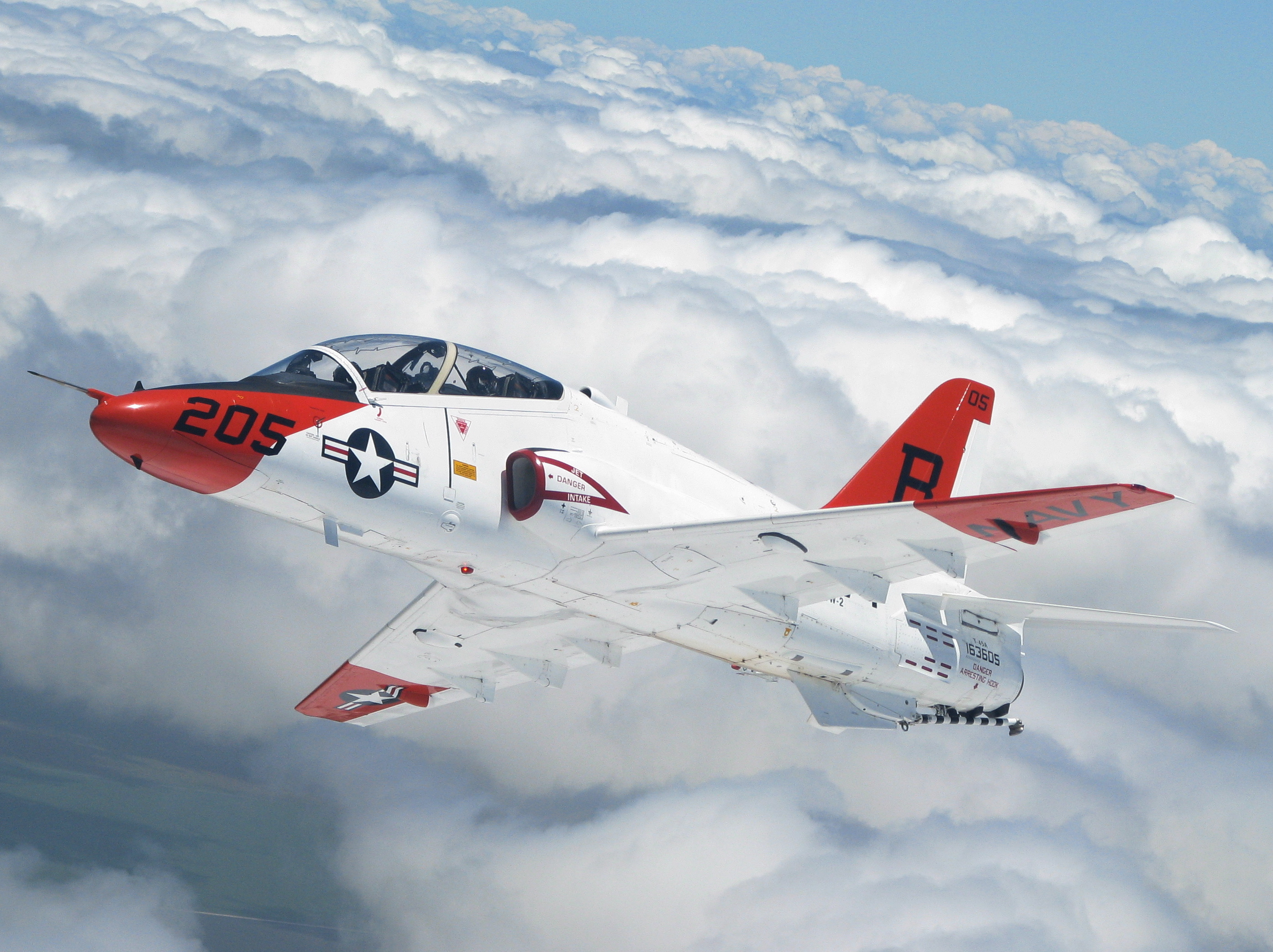
- The T-45A in flight

General information
- Type: Naval trainer aircraft
- National origin: United Kingdom/United States
- Manufacturer: McDonnell Douglas/British Aerospace; Boeing/BAE Systems
- Status: In service
- Primary user: United States Navy
- Number built: 221

History
- Manufactured: 1988–2009
- Introduction date: 1991
- First flight: 16 April 1988
- Developed from: BAE Systems Hawk

The McDonnell Douglas (now Boeing) T-45 Goshawk is a highly modified version of the British BAE Systems Hawk land-based training jet aircraft. Manufactured by McDonnell Douglas (now Boeing) and British Aerospace (now BAE Systems), the T-45 is used by the United States Navy as an aircraft carrier-capable trainer.

== Development ==
=== Background ===
The T-45 Goshawk has its origins in the mid-1970s, during which time the U.S. Navy formally commenced its search for a new jet trainer aircraft to serve as a single replacement for both its T-2 Buckeye and TA-4 Skyhawk trainers. During 1978, the VTXTS advanced trainer program to meet this need was formally launched by the U.S. Navy. An Anglo-American team, comprising British aviation manufacturer British Aerospace (BAe) and American aircraft company McDonnell Douglas (MDC), decided to submit their proposal for a navalised version of BAe's land-based Hawk trainer. Other manufacturers also submitted bids, such as a rival team of French aircraft company Dassault Aviation, German manufacturer Dornier, who offered their Alpha Jet to fulfil the requirement, and American aerospace company Lockheed.

The VTX-TS competition was not simply for the procurement of an aircraft in isolation; it comprised five core areas: the aircraft itself, capable flight simulators, matured academic training aids, integrated logistic support, and program management. For their proposal, MDC was the prime contractor and systems integrator, BAe functioned as the principal subcontractor and partner for the aircraft element, Rolls-Royce provided the Adour engine to power the aircraft, and Sperry is the principal subcontractor for the simulator system. During November 1981, the U.S. Navy announced that it had selected the Hawk as the winner of the VTX-TS competition. Reportedly, approximately 60 per cent of the work on the T-45 program was undertaken overseas in Britain. During September 1982, a Full Scale Engineering Development contract was awarded to the MDC team to fully develop and produce the proposed aircraft, which had been designated T-45 Goshawk. On 16 April 1988, the first T-45A Goshawk conducted its maiden flight.

=== Production ===
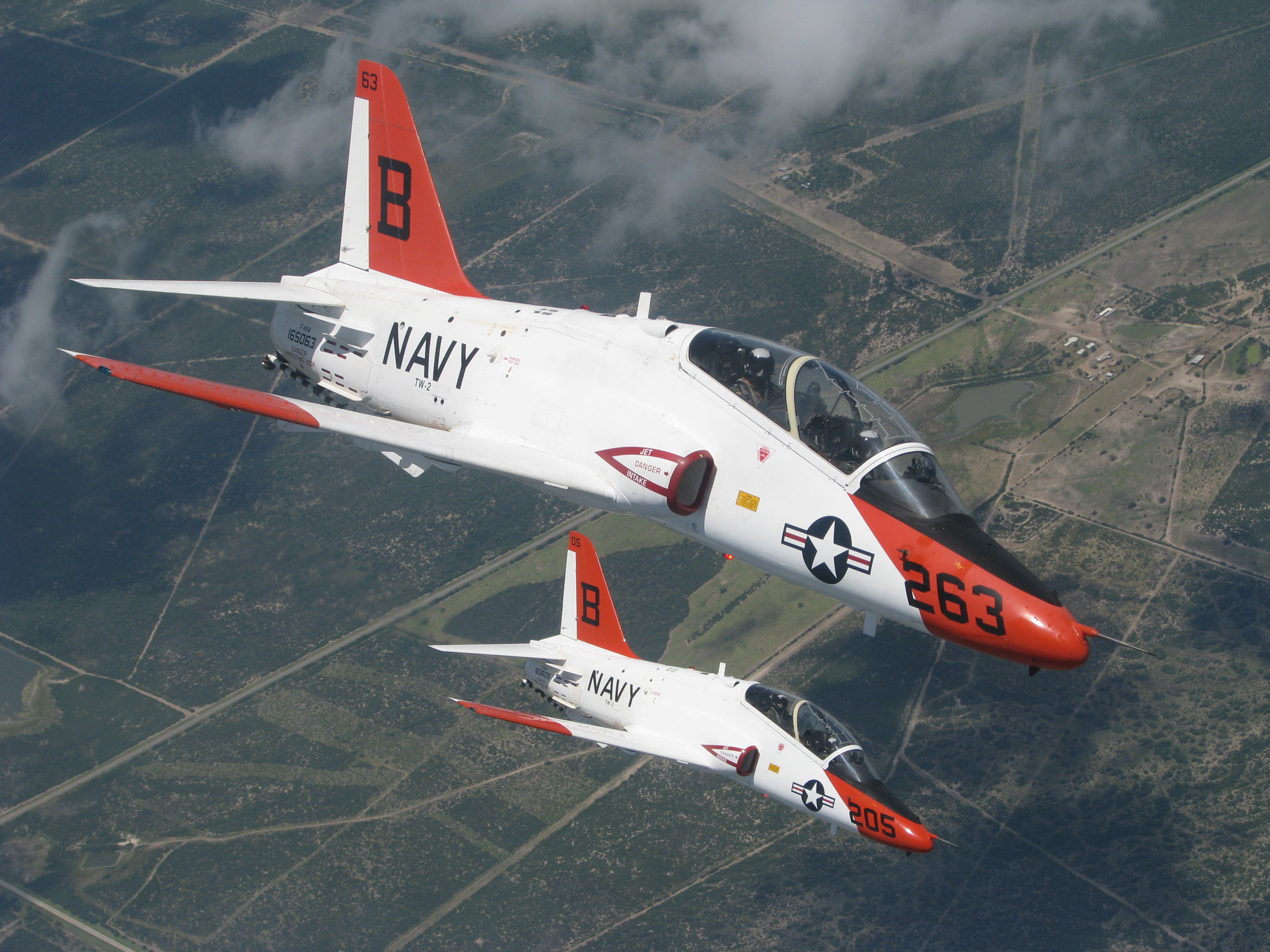
A pair of T-45A Goshawks during a training flight over Texas

Work on the production of the Goshawk was divided between the two primary partner companies. BAE Systems (BAe's successor following its merger with Marconi Electronic Systems during 1999) was responsible for manufacturing the fuselage aft of the cockpit, along with the air inlets, and the vertical stabilizer of the T-45 at their Samlesbury facility, while the wings were produced at the company's plant at Brough, England. Boeing (which had merged with McDonnell Douglas during 1997) performed the manufacture of the remaining elements of the Goshawk, as well as conducting assembly of the type at a production line at St. Louis, Missouri, after having transferred work on the program from the company's facility in Long Beach, California.

The Goshawk retained the typical powerplant used by the Hawk, the Rolls-Royce Adour turbofan jet engine. During the mid-1990s, Rolls-Royce worked on establishing a US-based production line for the Adour engine, which was to be operated by the former Allison Engine Company (which had been recently acquired by Rolls-Royce in 1995); however, during September 1997, the U.S. Navy chose to terminate the partially-finished engine effort. Around this time, the U.S. Navy was greatly interested in potentially adopting another powerplant, the International Turbine Engine Company's F124 turbofan engine, for the Goshawk. On 7 October 1996, a T-45A test aircraft flew, powered by the rival F124 engine.

Early production aircraft were designated T-45A. From December 1997 onwards, later-built production Goshawks were constructed with enhanced avionics systems, which included the adoption of a glass cockpit and head-up display (HUD); as such, they were designated T-45C. From 2003 onwards, all of the extant T-45A trainer aircraft were eventually converted to the more modern T-45C configuration under the T-45 Required Avionics Modernization Program. This program brought the U.S. Navy's trainers to an identical Cockpit 21 standard, which incorporated both the HUD and the glass cockpit, which had the benefit of making the trainers more similar to the U.S. Navy's frontline fighter aircraft. On 16 March 2007, it was announced that the 200th Goshawk had been delivered to the U.S. Navy. During November 2009, the 221st aircraft, the final aircraft to be produced, was delivered.

=== Further development ===
During early 2008, it was announced by the US Navy that several of its T-45C Goshawks would be outfitted with a synthetic radar capability to allow them to support rear crew training requirements, and that it was considering a possible requirement for a follow-on order for such equipped models of the type. An initial batch of 19 T-45Cs equipped with this virtual mission training system (VMTS), which simulates the capabilities of the US Navy's Boeing F/A-18E/F Super Hornet's Raytheon APG-73 radar (including ground mapping, air-to-ground and air-to-air targeting modes, along with an electronic warfare training capability) were delivered to the Navy's Undergraduate Military Flight Officer training school at Pensacola, Florida. The type was used to prepare weapon system and electronic warfare operators for the Super Hornet and the Boeing EA-18G Growler.

Both McDonnell Douglas and Boeing have made multiple approaches to potential overseas customers, typically offering the Goshawk in the trainer role. During the mid-1990s, McDonnell Douglas teamed up with Rockwell International to jointly bid the T-45 as a replacement for the Royal Australian Air Force's jet trainer fleet in competition against, amongst others, the Hawk that the type had been derived from. Marketing efforts to acquire export customers were intensified following a cut in the procurement rate by the U.S. Navy during 2003; according to Lon Nordeen, T-45 business development manager, Israel had been identified as having a potential requirement for the type. During late 2006, the company promoted the concept of an advanced variant of the T-45C Goshawk to Greece, emphasising its close compatibility with the Beechcraft T-6A Texan II trainer already operated by the country. During early 2007, Boeing VP Mark Kronenberg stated that the company had held discussions with the Indian Navy, which had an anticipated requirement for naval training aircraft.

Starting in 2003, the Air Education and Training Command (AETC) of the United States Air Force (USAF) worked on the requirements for replacing the 1960s-era Northrop T-38 Talon jet trainer. By 2010, the US Navy was reportedly involved in the evaluations for the initiative, known as the T-X program and had been considering the merits of adopting the same airframe to meet its long-term requirements to eventually replace the Goshawk as well. Reportedly, BAE Systems, later in partnership with American defense company Northrop Grumman, has repeatedly held discussions with the USAF on the development of a new potential derivative of the Hawk conforming to their specific trainer needs, similar in fashion to the Goshawk for the US Navy.

== Design ==
The T-45 Goshawk is a carrier-qualified version of the British Aerospace Hawk Mk.60. It was redesigned as a trainer for the United States Navy (USN) and United States Marine Corps (USMC). Changes were made to the Hawk in two stages. The Hawk was redesigned for carrier operations and submitted to the Navy for flight evaluation. The development flight trials resulted in further modifications.

The initial redesign included stronger landing gear and airframe to withstand the loads imposed by catapult launches and high sink-rate 4.3 m/s (14 ft/sec) landings. A catapult tow bar attachment was added to the oleo strut of the new two-wheel nose gear . Other additions were an arresting hook, an increased span tailplane, side-mounted airbrakes, and the addition of stabilator vanes, known as 'Side Mounted Upper Rear Fuselage Strakes' (SMURFS - USN), to stabilize flow over the stabilator with speed brakes extended.

Navy test pilots found deficiences which had to be corrected. Some required further external changes: a single ventral fin in front of the arrestor hook, a 6-inch (0.152 m) extension to the tail fin, squared-off wing tips and leading-edge slats.

At the time of the Goshawk's selection, the World War II-era USS Lexington was the U.S. Navy's training carrier. Lexington, which featured a 277 m (910 ft) long and 58.5 m (192 ft) wide angled flight deck, complete with a pair of relatively short-stroke steam catapults and similarly short, undamped arrester gear, was a major driving factor for the design of the T-45 in order to suit such operations. The aerodynamic changes of the aircraft, which were developed by BAe at their existing facilities in the United Kingdom, included improvements to the low-speed handling characteristics and a reduction in the approach speed. During flight testing of the Goshawk, it was revealed that the aircraft had retained relatively favourable flight characteristics, even when flown within stall conditions at the required low approach speed.

== Operational history ==
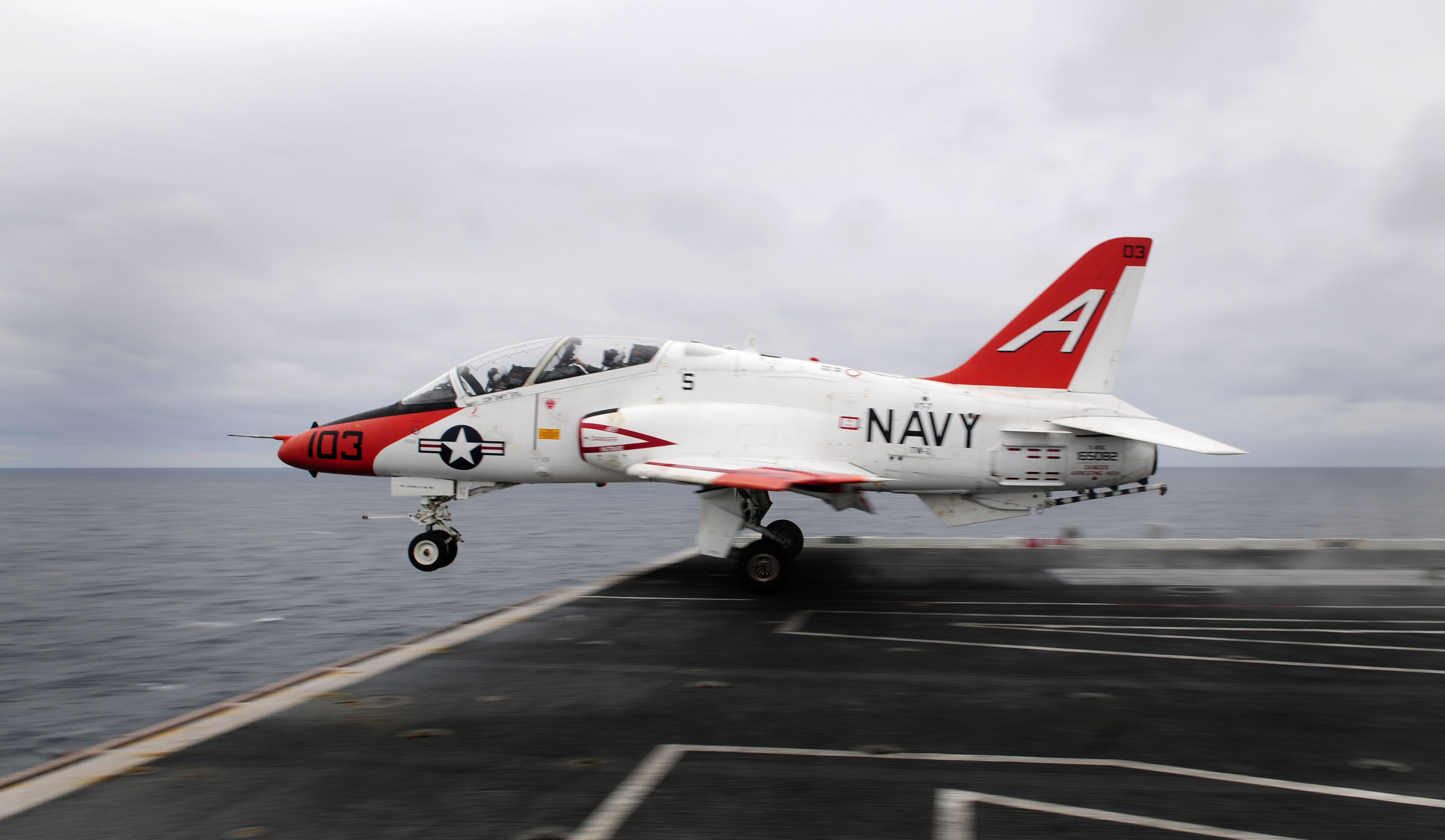
A T-45 Goshawk being launched from USS John C. Stennis in 2010

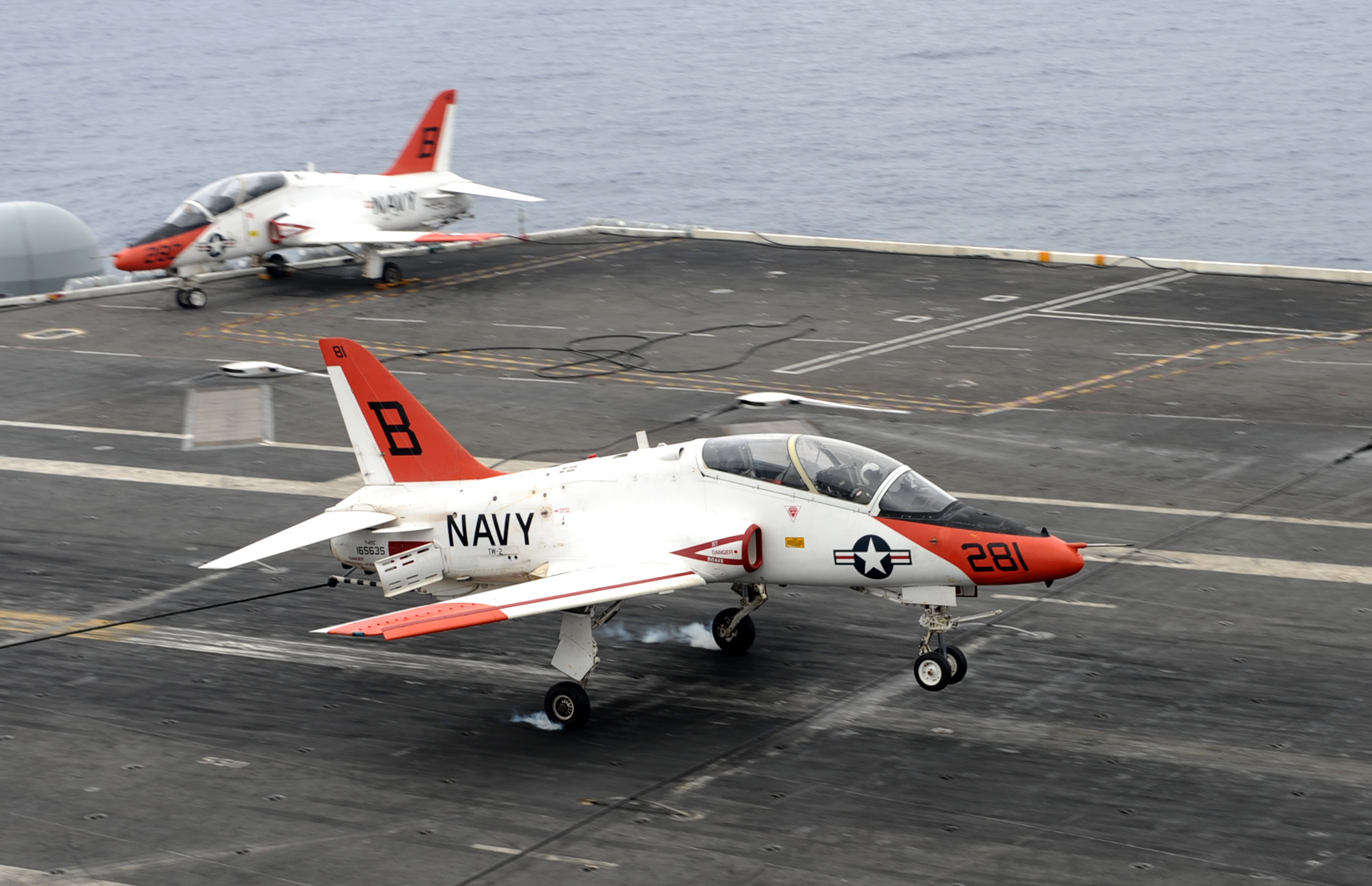
A T-45 Goshawk making an arrested landing on USS Dwight D. Eisenhower in 2011

The T-45 has been used for intermediate and advanced portions of the Navy/Marine Corps Student Naval Aviator strike pilot training program with Training Air Wing One at Naval Air Station Meridian, Mississippi, and Training Air Wing Two at Naval Air Station Kingsville, Texas. The T-45 replaced the T-2C Buckeye intermediate jet trainer and the TA-4J Skyhawk II advanced jet trainer with an integrated training system that includes the T-45 Goshawk aircraft, operational and instrument flight simulators, academics, and training integration system support. In 2008, the T-45C also began operation in the advanced portion of Navy/Marine Corps Student Naval Flight Officer training track for strike aircraft with Training Air Wing Six at Naval Air Station Pensacola, Florida. A small number of the aircraft is also operated by the Naval Air Systems Command at Naval Air Station Patuxent River, Maryland.

The original T-45A, which became operational in 1991, contained an analog cockpit design, while the newer T-45C, which was first delivered in December 1997, features a new digital "glass cockpit" design. All T-45A aircraft currently in operational use are upgraded to T-45C standard. The T-45 is to remain in service until 2035 or later.

In 2017, the USN grounded the T-45 fleet for a three-day "safety pause" after more than 100 instructor pilots refused to fly the aircraft. The pilots cited concerns about incidents of hypoxia that they believed to have resulted from faulty Cobham GGU-7 onboard oxygen-generation systems. Over the past five years physiological episodes linked to problems with the T-45's oxygen system have nearly quadrupled, according to testimony from senior naval aviators in April 2017. The grounding order was first extended, but then lifted to allow flights up to a ceiling of 10,000 feet where the Onboard Oxygen Generation System (OBOGS) would not be needed, and to allow instructors to conduct flights above 10,000 feet. The grounding order was fully lifted, along with all restrictions on flight ceiling and student pilots, in August 2017. The T-45 fleet was thereafter upgraded with new sensors to monitor the onboard oxygen systems, as well as a new water separation system, in hopes of reducing hypoxia events and determining the root cause of the problems. By the first quarter of 2018, hypoxia events had returned to nominal levels after peaking in 2016 and 2017. The fleet was later fitted with Cobham's revised GGU-25 onboard oxygen generating systems.

In recent years, similar issues have also affected the Navy's F/A-18s and the Air Force's T-6s, F-22s, and F-35s, some within the same or similar time frames, and the Department of Defense has established a joint command to investigate the issue.

On 14 October 2022, the Navy's T-45 fleet was grounded following a low-pressure compressor blade fault being identified during a pre-flight check. The grounding was lifted after two weeks.

== Variants ==
T-45A
Two-seat basic and advanced jet trainer for the US Navy and US Marine Corps

T-45B
Proposed land-based version which would have been essentially a conventional Hawk furnished with a US Navy-spec cockpit and no carrier capability. The US Navy had wanted to procure the T-45B so that trainee pilots could benefit from an earlier training capability, but abandoned the idea during 1984 in favor of less-costly updates to the TA-4J and T-2C.

T-45C
Improved T-45A, outfitted with a glass cockpit, inertial navigation, and other improvements. All existing T-45As have been upgraded to the T-45C standard.

T-45D
Tentative designation for an envisioned upgrade of the T-45, potentially incorporating various manufacturing improvements and additional equipment, such as helmet-mounted displays.

== Operators ==
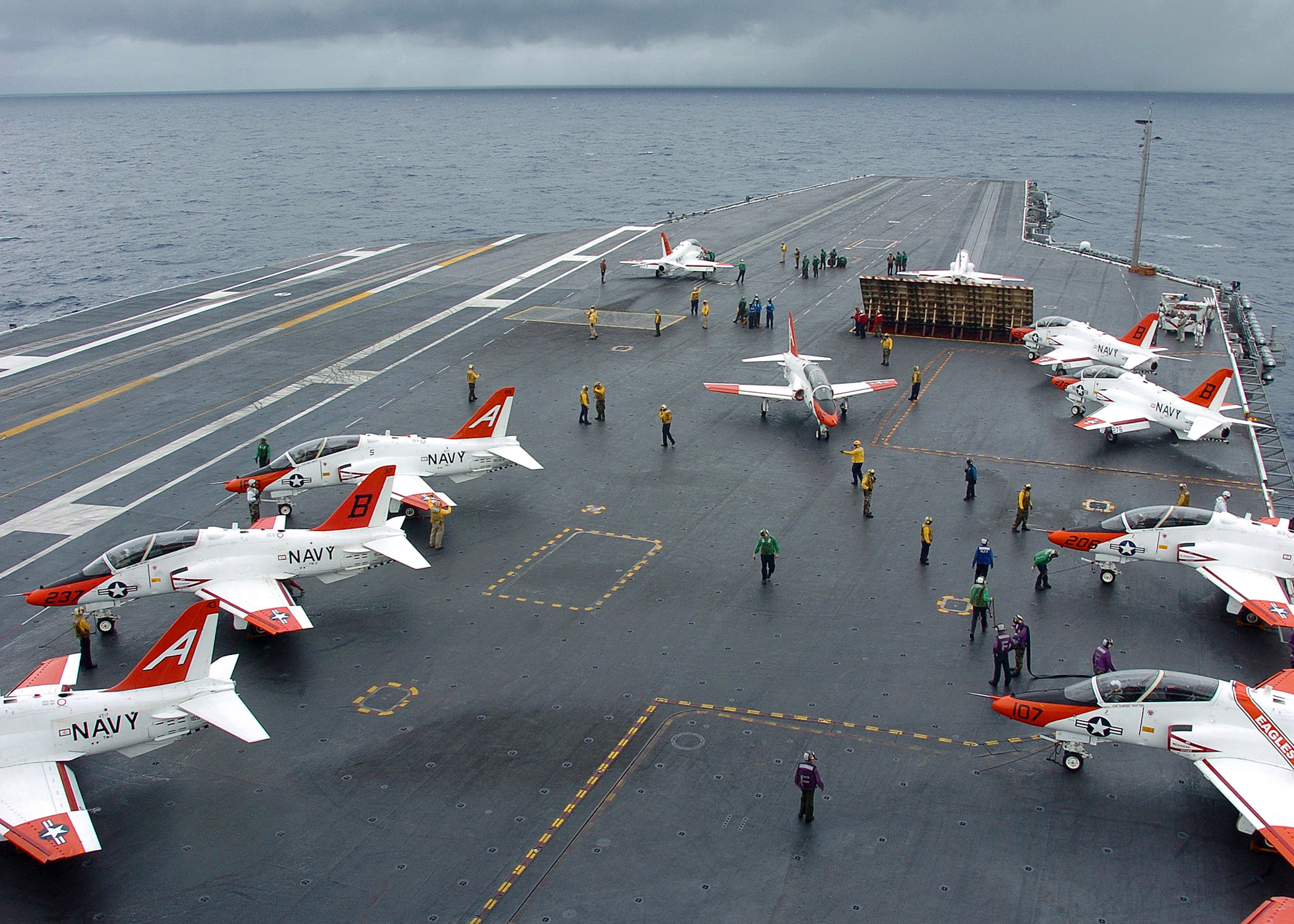
T-45 Goshawks on board USS Harry S. Truman in 2005

United States

- United States Navy: T-45C

== Accidents ==
As of May 2026, about 34 T-45 Goshawks have been destroyed in accidents, or about 15% of the inventory, at a rate of about 1 per year.

== Specifications (T-45A) ==
Data from The International Directory of Military Aircraft, 2002–2003, Navy fact file, T-45A/C Goshawk, Jane's All the World's Aircraft 2005-06

General characteristics

- Crew: 2
- Length: 39 ft 4 in (11.99 m)
- Wingspan: 30 ft 9.75 in (9.3917 m)
- Height: 13 ft 6 in (4.11 m)
- Wing area: 190.1 sq ft (17.66 m^{2})
- Airfoil: root: Hawker 10.9%; tip: Hawker 9%
- Empty weight: 9,394 lb (4,261 kg)
- Gross weight: 12,750 lb (5,783 kg)
- Max takeoff weight: 13,500 lb (6,123 kg)
- Fuel capacity: 432 US gal (360 imp gal; 1,640 L) / 3,159 lb (1,433 kg) internal fuel (2,893 lb (1,312 kg) - early production aircraft), with provision for 2 × 156 US gal (130 imp gal; 590 L) drop tanks underwing
- Powerplant: 1 × Rolls-Royce Turbomeca F405-RR-401 turbofan engine, 5,527 lbf (24.59 kN) thrust de-rated (nominal thrust 5,845 lbf (25,999.86 N))

Performance

- Maximum speed: 543 kn (625 mph, 1,006 km/h) at 8,000 ft (2,400 m)

M0.84 at 30,000 ft (9,100 m)

- Carrier launch speed: 121 kn (139 mph; 224 km/h)
- Approach speed: 125 kn (144 mph; 232 km/h)
- Never exceed speed: 575 kn (662 mph, 1,065 km/h) / M1.04 design dive limit at 10,000 ft (3,000 m)
- Range: 700 nmi (810 mi, 1,300 km)
- Ferry range: 700 nmi (810 mi, 1,300 km)
- Service ceiling: 42,500 ft (13,000 m)
- g limits: +7.33 -3
- Rate of climb: 8,000 ft/min (41 m/s) at sea level
- Time to altitude: 30,000 ft (9,100 m) in 7 minutes 40 seconds
- Wing loading: 67.1 lb/sq ft (328 kg/m^{2})
- Thrust/weight: 0.41
- Take-off distance to 50 ft (15 m): 3,610 ft (1,100 m)
- Landing distance from 50 ft (15 m): 3,310 ft (1,010 m)

Armament

- Usually none: One hardpoint under each wing can be used to carry practice bomb racks (can carry up to 12 Mk-76 practice bombs), rocket pods, or fuel tanks. A centerline hardpoint can carry a cargo pod for crew baggage.

Avionics

- Smiths Industries, Ltd. AN/USN-2(V) Standard Attitude Heading and Reference System, later replaced by the BAE/Marconi AN/ASN-180 Navigation Guidance System
- Rockwell Collins AN/ARN-144 VHF Omnidirectional Radio Range / Instrument Landing System
- Honeywell AN/APN-194 Radar altimeter
- Northrop Grumman AN/ASN-166 Inertial Guidance Set Incorporates a Northrop Grumman (formerly Litton) LN-100G ring laser gyroscope, a Rockwell Collins Global Positioning System, and a Kalman filter

Communications suite

- Rockwell Collins AN/ARC-182 UHF/VHF radio
- Honeywell AN/APX-100 identification friend or foe system

== See also ==
External image
- Hi-res cutaway of T-45 Goshawk
- Hi-res cutaway of T-45 Goshawk by Flight Global.

Related development

- BAE Systems Hawk
- British Aerospace Hawk 200

Aircraft of comparable role, configuration, and era

- Lockheed T2V/T-1 SeaStar
- McDonnell Douglas TA-4F/J Skyhawk
- North American T-2 Buckeye
- Sukhoi Su-25UTG
- Guizhou JL-9G

Related lists

- List of active United States military aircraft
