= 10th Wing =

10th Wing may refer to:

- 10th Air Base Wing (earlier, 10th Reconnaissance Wing, 10th Tactical Reconnaissance Wing, 10th Tactical Fighter Wing), a unit of the United States Air Force
- 10th Tactical Wing, a unit of the Belgian Air Force
- 10th Fighter Wing, a unit of the United States Army Air Force of WWII

== See also ==
- Tenth Army (disambiguation)
- X Corps (disambiguation)
- 10th Division (disambiguation)
- 10th Group (disambiguation)
- 10th Brigade (disambiguation)
- 10th Regiment (disambiguation)
- 10 Squadron (disambiguation)
- X-wing (disambiguation)
