= 10th Battalion =

10th Battalion may refer to:

- 10th Battalion (Canadians), CEF
- 10th Battalion (Australia)
- 10th Battalion, Ulster Defence Regiment
  - 7th/10th Battalion, Ulster Defence Regiment
- 2/10th Battalion (Australia)

== See also ==
- 10th Army (disambiguation)
- 10th Corps (disambiguation)
- 10th Brigade (disambiguation)
- 10th Division (disambiguation)
- 10th Regiment (disambiguation)
- 10th Group (disambiguation)
- 10th Squadron (disambiguation)
