= 10th Infantry =

10th Infantry may refer to:

- 10th Infantry Regiment (disambiguation)
- 10th Infantry Brigade (disambiguation)
- 10th Infantry Division (disambiguation)

== See also ==
- 10th (disambiguation)
