= 10th Reserve Division =

10th Reserve Division may refer to:

- 10th Reserve Division (People's Republic of China)
- 10th Reserve Division (German Empire)

== See also ==
- 10th Division (disambiguation)
