= 10th New-Ingermanland Infantry Regiment =

The 10th New-Ingermanland Infantry Regiment (Russian: Новоингерманландский 10-й пехотный полк) was an infantry regiment of the Imperial Russian Army. It was founded in 1785 and was disbanded in 1918.

== History ==
10th New-Ingermanland Infantry Regiment
- Новоингерманландский 10-й пехотный полк
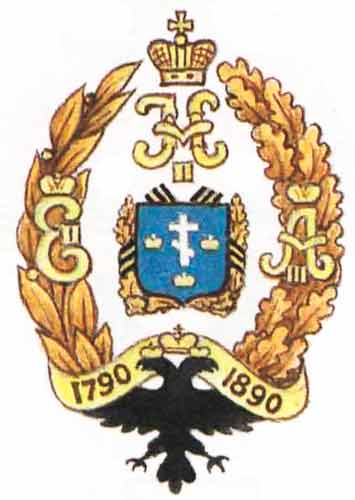
- Badge
- Active: 1790 - 1918
- Country: Russian Empire
- Branch: Imperial Russian Army; Russian Army (1917)
- Type: Infantry
- Part of: 3rd Infantry Division
- Garrison/HQ: Varying
- Engagements: Russo-Turkish War (1787–1792); Battle of Leipzig; First battle of Wawer; Battle of Olszynka Grochowska; Russo-Turkish War (1877–1878)

The regiment was formed during the second half of the eighteenth century as a musketeer infantry regiment in the city of Kherson. Its first official name is the Kherson Infantry Regiment. Throughout its existence, the regiment was renamed several times and was stationed at various garrisons.

=== Name changes ===
- 1785 – Formed as the Kherson Infantry Regiment.
- 1790 – Renamed as the Ingermoland Infantry Regiment.
- 1792 – Renamed as the New Ingermoland Infantry Regiment.
- 1796 – Renamed as the New Ingermanland Musketeer Regiment.
- 1798 – Renamed as the Major General Rosen's Musketeer Regiment.
- 1801 – Restored the New Ingermanland Musketeer.
- 1811 – Renamed as the New Ingermanland Infantry Regiment.
- 1864 – Renamed the 10th New-Ingermanland Infantry Regiment

=== 1820 ===
The regiment was stationed at Toropets, Pskov Governorate. The 2nd Battalion was assigned to military settlements in Novgorod Governorate. The regiment formed part of the 3rd Infantry Division.

=== 1836–1840 ===
From the winter of 1835–36 until 27 April 1836, the regimental headquarters and the 2nd Battalion were stationed at Volkovysk. While the 1st, 3rd, and 4th Battalions were on guard duty in Vilnius. From 9 May to 9 July 1836, the regimental headquarters and all four battalions were quartered in Vilnius. From 9 July to 18 September 1836, the regiment was encamped at Kaunas. From 18 September 1836 until the spring of 1837, the regimental headquarters and the 1st, 2nd, and 3rd Battalions occupied winter quarters at Volkovysk, while the 4th Battalion was stationed at Brest-Litovsk. In the spring of 1837, until 25 June, the regimental headquarters and the 1st, 2nd, and 3rd Battalions were on guard duty in Vilna. On 13 March, the 4th Battalion returned to Volkovysk from Brest-Litovsk and moved to Kovno in April. From 25 June to 15 August 1837, the regiment was encamped at Kovno. From 15 August 1837 to 3 May 1838, the 1st Battalion was stationed at Grodno, the 2nd Battalion at Białystok, and the regimental headquarters together with the 3rd and 4th Battalions at Volkovysk. From 3 May to 30 September 1838, the regiment was on guard duty in Vilnius. After 30 September it returned to Volkovysk.

=== 1840–1850 ===
From 1 December 1839 to 11 March 1841, the regimental headquarters was stationed at Piotrków, the 1st Battalion at Brzeziny, the 2nd Battalion at Rawa, and the 4th Battalion at Łaz. From 17 March to 15 May 1841, the regiment was stationed in Warsaw. From 22 September 1841 to 1 April 1842, the regimental headquarters remained at Piotrków, the 1st Battalion was stationed at Kalisz, the 2nd Battalion at Rawa, the 3rd Battalion at Tuszyn, and the 4th Battalion at Sieradz and Łask. From 3 August 1842 to 12 April 1843, the regimental headquarters and the 4th Battalion were stationed at Chișinău, the 1st Battalion at Hîncești, the 2nd Battalion at Bolshoy Gerton, and the 3rd Battalion at Călărași. From 4 May to 18 September 1843, the regimental headquarters and the 1st Battalion were stationed at Novogeorgievsk, the 2nd Battalion at Kamisarovka, the 3rd Battalion at Nova Praga, and the 4th Battalion at Novomyrhorod. From 12 October 1843 to 8 August 1844, the regiment was quartered at Chișinău. From 8 August to 30 September 1844, it was encamped near the city before returning to its quarters there on 30 September. During 1845, the regiment spent the summer in camp near Yelisavetgrad. From 13 October 1845 to 6 May 1846, it was stationed at Kozelets. From 9 May to 20 October 1846, it was stationed at Kyiv. From 20 October 1846 to 17 May 1847, the regiment returned to Kozelets. Between 17 May and 6 October 1847, the regimental headquarters was located at Zhytomyr. From 6 October 1847 to 1 May 1848, the regiment was again stationed at Kozelets. From 1 May to 16 June 1848, it marched from Kozelets to Grodno, where it remained until 1 August. From 9 August to 22 November 1848, the regimental headquarters and the 3rd Battalion were stationed at Bielsk, the 1st Battalion at Klenki, the 2nd Battalion at Orzysz, and the 4th Battalion at Suraż. From 22 November 1848 to 18 April 1849, the regimental headquarters and the 3rd Battalion were stationed at Grodno, the 1st Battalion at Yezery, the 2nd Battalion at Skidel, and the 4th Battalion at Novy Dvor. From 24 May to 12 June 1849, the regiment was stationed at Kalisz, and from 18 June to 26 August at Piotrków. On 26 October 1849, the regiment arrived at Mariampol.

=== 1850–1860 ===
From 3 May to 16 August 1850 the regiment was encamped near Suwałki. From 17 August to 27 November 1850, the regiment was stationed at Białystok. On 7 December 1850, the regiment arrived at Novogeorgievsk, where it remained until 4 May 1851. From 4 May to 25 June 1851, the regiment was encamped near Warsaw.
