= 10 Squadron =

10 Squadron or 10th Squadron may refer to:

- No. 10 Squadron IAF, a fighter squadron of the Indian Air Force
- No. 10 Squadron RAAF, a unit of the Royal Australian Air Force
- No. 10 Squadron RCAF, an anti-submarine unit of the Royal Canadian Air Force
- No. 10 Squadron (Finland), a unit of the Finnish Air Force
- No. 10 Squadron RAF, a unit of the UK Royal Air Force
- 10th Missile Squadron, a unit of the US Air Force
- 10th Space Warning Squadron, a unit of the US Air Force
- 10th Airlift Squadron, a unit of the US Air Force
- Training Squadron 10, a unit of the US Navy

== See also ==
- 10th Army (disambiguation)
- 10th Corps (disambiguation)
- 10th Division (disambiguation)
- 10th Wing (disambiguation)
- 10th Brigade (disambiguation)
- 10th Regiment (disambiguation)
- 10th Group (disambiguation)
- 10th Battalion (disambiguation)
