= 10th Division =

10th Division or 10th Infantry Division may refer to:

== Infantry divisions ==
- 10th Division (Australia)
- 10th Infantry Division (Bangladesh)
- 10th Infantry Division (Belgium)
- 10th Division (People's Republic of China)
- 10th Garrison Division (People's Republic of China)
- 10th Garrison Division of Shenyang Military Region
- 10th Reserve Division (People's Republic of China)
- 10th Infantry Division (France)
- 10th Parachute Division (France)
- 10th Bavarian Infantry Division (German Empire) – World War I
- 10th Division (German Empire)
- 10th Ersatz Division, German Empire
- 10th Infantry Division (Wehrmacht)
- 10th Landwehr Division, German Empire
- 10th Luftwaffe Field Division, Germany
- 10th Parachute Division (Germany)
- 10th Reserve Division (German Empire)
- 10th Infantry Division (Greece)
- 10th Indian Division, British Indian Army during World War I
- 10th Infantry Division (India)
- 10th Infantry Division "Piave", Italy
- 10th Division (Imperial Japanese Army)
- 10th Division (Japan)
- 10th Division (North Korea)
- 10th Infantry Division (Ottoman Empire)
- 10th Infantry Division (Philippines)
- 10th Infantry Division (Poland)
- 10th Infantry Division (Russian Empire)
- 10th Guards Airborne Division, Soviet Union
- 10th Guards Motor Rifle Division, Soviet Union
- 10th NKVD Rifle Division, Soviet Union
- 10th Rifle Division (Soviet Union)
- 10th Mechanized Division, Syria
- 10th (Irish) Division, United Kingdom
- 10th Infantry Division (United States, WWI)
- 10th Mountain Division, United States, later the 10th Infantry Division
- 31st Infantry Division (United States), formerly the 10th Division, a U.S. National Guard division established in early 1917 consisting of Alabama, Florida, and Georgia
- 10th Division (Vietnam)
- 10th Division (Yugoslav Partisans)

== Cavalry divisions ==
- 10th Cavalry Division (France)
- 10th Cavalry Division (Russian Empire)

== Armoured divisions ==
- 10th Armoured Division (France)
- 10th Panzer Division (Wehrmacht) (Germany)
- 10th Panzer Division (Bundeswehr) (Germany)
- 10th SS Panzer Division Frundsberg (Germany)
- 10th Division (Iraq)
- 10th Guards Uralsko-Lvovskaya Tank Division (Soviet Union)
- 10th Tank Division (Soviet Union)
- 10th Armoured Division (United Kingdom)
- 10th Armored Division (United States)

== Aviation divisions ==
- 10th Bomber Division, People's Republic of China
- 10th Air Division, United States

== Other divisions ==
- 10th Flak Division, Luftwaffe, Germany
- 10th Anti-Aircraft Division, United Kingdom

== See also ==
- Tenth Army (disambiguation)
- X Corps (disambiguation)
- 10th Brigade (disambiguation)
- 10th Regiment (disambiguation)
- 10th Group (disambiguation)
- 10th Battalion (disambiguation)
- 10th Wing (disambiguation)
- 10 Squadron (disambiguation)
