= 10th Panzer Division =

10th Panzer Division may refer to:

- 10th Panzer Division (Wehrmacht)
- 10th Panzer Division (Bundeswehr)
- 10th SS Panzer Division Frundsberg

== See also ==
- 10th Division (disambiguation)
