= Novy Dvor rural council =

Novy Dvor rural council (Belarusian: Навадворскі сельсавет) may refer to:

- Novy Dvor, Minsk district rural council
- Novy Dvor, Pinsk district rural council
- Novy Dvor, Svislach district rural council
