= VT4 (disambiguation) =

- VT-4 is a Chinese main battle tank.

VT4 or VT-4 may also refer to:

- VT-4 (United States), U.S. Navy aircraft squadron

Vermont

- Vermont's 4th congressional district
- VT 4, Vermont Route 4A
- U.S. Route 4 in Vermont

Other

- VT4, former name of Play4, a Flemish television station.
- VT[4] or Video Toaster, the fourth version of a non-linear video editing and effects software package.
