= Tenth Army =

Tenth Army or 10th Army may refer to:

== Germany ==
- 10th Army (German Empire), a World War I field Army
- 10th Army (Wehrmacht), a World War II field army

== Russia/Soviet Union ==
- 10th Army (Russian Empire)
- 10th Army (RSFSR)
- 10th Army (Soviet Union)
- 10th Air Army, Soviet Union
- 10th Guards Army, Soviet Union
- 10th Independent Air Defence Army, Soviet Union
- 10th Terek-Dagestan Army, Red Army, Russian Civil War

== Others ==
- Tenth Army (Austria-Hungary)
- Tenth Army (France)
- Tenth Army (Italy)
- Tenth Area Army, Japan
- Tenth Army (Japan)
- Tenth Army (United Kingdom)
- Tenth United States Army

== See also ==
- List of armies by number
- X Corps (disambiguation)
- 10th Division (disambiguation)
- 10th Brigade (disambiguation)
- 10th Regiment (disambiguation)
- 10th Battalion (disambiguation)
- 10th Wing (disambiguation)
- 10th Squadron (disambiguation)
- 10th Group (disambiguation)
- 10th (disambiguation)
