= 10th Submarine Squadron =

10th Submarine Squadron may refer to:

- 10th Submarine Squadron (India), consisting of the Shishumar-class submarines
- 10th Submarine Squadron (United Kingdom)
- Submarine Squadron 10, United States Navy

== See also ==
- Submarine
- Submarine squadron
- 10th Squadron (disambiguation)
