= 3rd Infantry Division (Russian Empire) =

- 3-я пехотная дивизия
- Active: 1806 – c. 1918
- Country: Russian Empire
- Branch: (Russian Empire) Russian Imperial Army
- Role: Infantry
- Size: approx. 20,000
- Garrison/HQ: Kaluga
- Engagements: World War I; Brusilov Offensive

The 3rd Infantry Division (Russian: 3-я пехотная дивизия, 3-ya pekhotnaya diviziya) was an infantry formation of the Russian Imperial Army that existed in various formations from 1806 until the end of World War I and the Russian Revolution. From before 1903 to the end of its existence the division was based in Kaluga.

== History ==
The unit was initially formed in 1806. In 1916, during World War I, the 3rd Infantry Division took part in the Brusilov Offensive. It was demobilized around the time of the Russian Revolution and the subsequent unrest.

== Organization ==
Russian infantry divisions consisted of a staff, two infantry brigades, and one artillery brigade. The 3rd Infantry Division was part of the 17th Army Corps as of 1914.

- 1st Brigade
  - 9th Emperor Peter the Great's Ingermanland Infantry Regiment
  - 10th New-Ingermanland Infantry Regiment
- 2nd Brigade
  - 11th General Field Marshal Prince Kutuzov of Smolensk's Pskov Infantry Regiment
  - 12th Velikiye Luki Infantry Regiment
- 3rd Artillery Brigade

== Known commanders ==
	Name	From	To
1	Lieutenant General Ivan Ganetsky	22.08.1863	4.04.1876
2	Lieutenant General Viktor Aspelund	19.05.1900	8.04.1904
3	Lieutenant General Nikolai Orlov	11.01.1906	22.09.1910
4	Lieutenant General Pyotr Polzikov	22.09.1910	15.04.1914
5	Major General Alexander Sholp	??.07.1916	1917

== Known chiefs of staff ==
	Name	From	To
1	Colonel Andrei Ugryumov	29.02.1896	31.10.1899
2	Colonel Ivan Lvov	25.11.1899	15.10.1902
3	Colonel Grulev	1.07.1903	?
4	Colonel Sergei Tsyeil	1.06.1904	25.08.1905
5	Colonel Nikandr Lashchilin	16.06.1908	4.06.1910
6	Colonel Pavlyuk	1.02.1913	?
7	Colonel Serebryannikov	1.04.1914	?
8	Colonel Fyodor Afanasyev	5.02.1916	3.11.1916
