= Weapon systems officer =

Air officer in charge of armaments

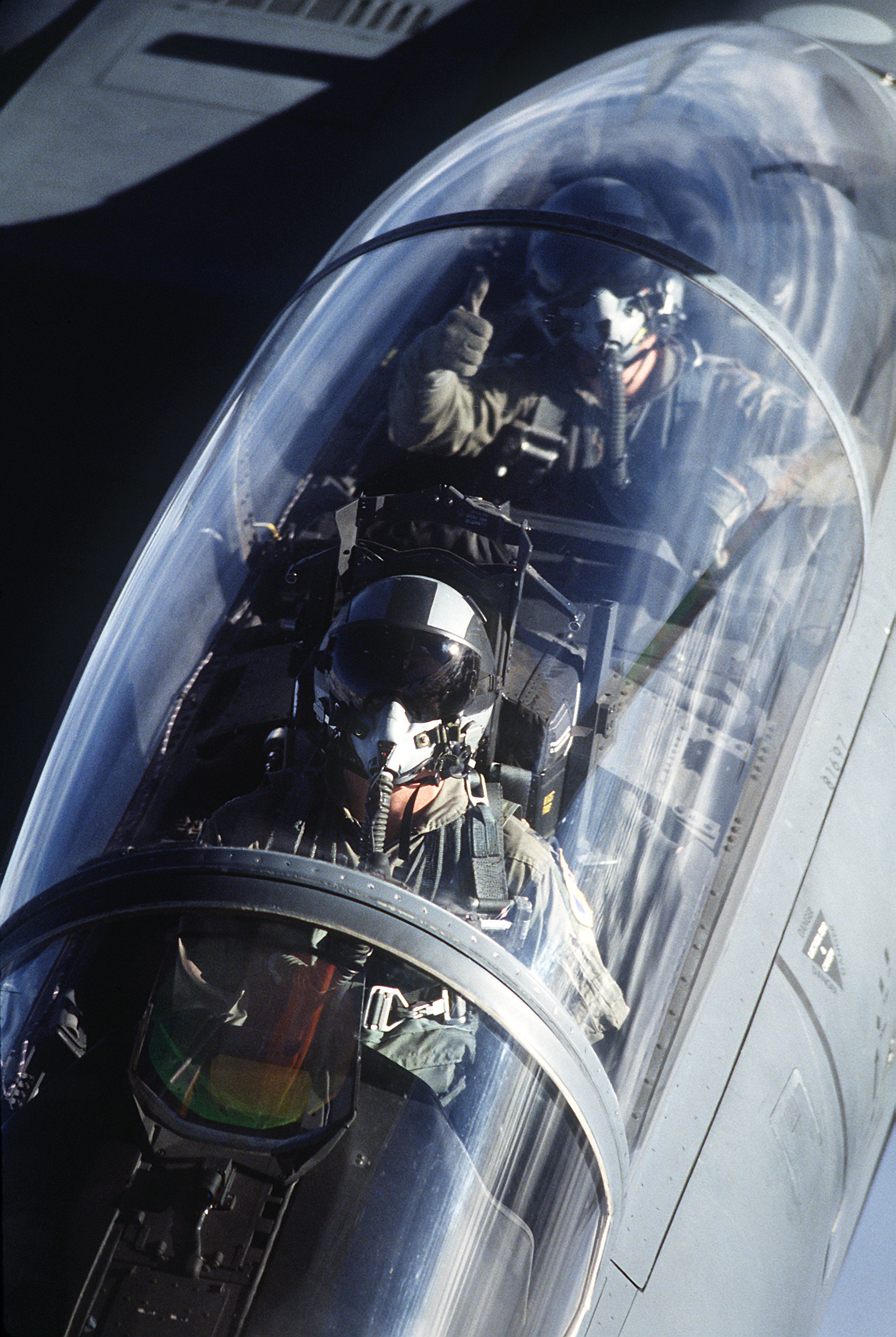
F-15E cockpit view from tanker; pilot and WSO visible - 20 May 1992

A weapon systems officer (WSO), nicknamed "Wizzo", is an air flight officer directly involved in all air operations and weapon systems of a military aircraft.

Historically, aircrew duties in military aircraft were highly specialised and rigid, because the relevant controls, instruments/displays, and/or weapons were concentrated in front of particular seats, panels or positions. That included two-seat variants of fighter or attack/strike aircraft (including late 20th century types such as the F-4 Phantom II, A-6 Intruder, F-111 Aardvark, F-14 Tomcat, Panavia Tornado, Su-24 Fencer and Su-30MK Flanker-C, Dassault Mirage 2000N/2000D).

From the 1970s onward, aircraft with two-member crews, such as the F-15E Strike Eagle, F/A-18F Super Hornet or Su-34 Fullback and Dassault Rafale B, have often featured programmable multi-function displays. These programs allow roles to be more flexible than previous generation aircraft. Multiple crew members can be responsible for detecting, targeting and engaging air-to-air or ground targets, communications, datalinks and/or defensive systems. Roles can be customized based on experience, expertise, workload, tactics, and weapons being employed. Pilots usually retain the responsibility for flying the aircraft in tactical situations. However, the crews of dedicated bomber aircraft usually retain distinct, rigidly defined and conventional roles.

== United Kingdom ==
In the Royal Air Force, a WSO is a commissioned officer that operates aircraft mission systems formerly on the Gloster Meteor NF.14, Gloster Javelin FAW.9R, Blackburn Buccaneer S.2B, McDonnell Douglas F-4J Phantom II F.3, Panavia Tornado ADV F.3, Panavia Tornado IDS GR4, Sentinel R1 and Boeing E-3D Sentry, however now on the Reaper MQ-9A drone, the RC-135W Rivet Joint, Shadow R1, and the Poseidon MRA1 maritime patrol aircraft.

Non-commissioned aircrew can serve as a WSOp (weapon systems operator), an umbrella term for the various specialist aircrew responsible for assisting the pilot in operating the mission systems of the aircraft (e.g. linguists, loadmasters, crewman).

== United States ==
=== Overview ===
==== U.S. Navy and U.S. Marine Corps ====
In the United States Navy, WSOs are naval flight officers responsible for manning the weapon systems of the F/A-18F Super Hornet strike fighter from that jet's aft seat. Prior to the introduction of the F/A-18F, they were known as Radar Intercept Officers (RIO) in the aft seats of the F-4S Phantom II and F-14D Tomcat; as Bombardier/Navigators (B/N) in the right seat of the MF-10B Skyknight, A-6E Intruder and the A-3B Skywarrior and in the aft seat in the A-5B Vigilante; and Reconnaissance Attack Navigators (RAN) in the aft seat of the RA-5C Vigilante.

In U.S. Naval Aviation (USN and USMC), when designated as the mission commander (MC), the WSO is responsible for all phases of the assigned mission, especially if there are multiple aircraft involved. For example, the aircraft pilot could be the junior member of a flight crew such as a USN lieutenant, junior grade/USMC 1st lieutenant or USN lieutenant/USMC captain, and the weapon systems officer could be a senior officer such as a USN lieutenant commander, commander or captain, or a USMC major, lieutenant colonel, or colonel; this would likely make the WSO the mission commander. As of 2021, the USMC is moving away from the use of the F/A-18C/D Hornet to the F-35C Lightning II which does not utilize the WSO position. Hence the last class of USMC WSO's graduated from NAS Pensacola in 2021.

==== U.S. Air Force ====
In the U.S. Air Force, WSO is one of three tracks of the Combat Systems Officer family of AFSCs (12x). A WSO may be found aboard the B-1B (12BXC), the B-52H (12BXE), the F-15E (12FXF), or the AC-130J (12SXR).

WSOs also flew in the now-retired F-111F Aardvark strike bomber, flown by the US Air Force and Royal Australian Air Force, and the now retired USAF EF-111A Raven airborne jammer. In the F-111, the WSO (EWO in the EF-111) was seated directly to the right of the pilot/aircraft commander. The WSO integrates with the pilot to collectively achieve and maintain crew efficiency, situational awareness and mission effectiveness. In the U.S. Air Force fighter aircraft such as the F-15E Strike Eagle, the WSO can pilot the aircraft when required, although this is typically during non-tactical portions of the mission (e.g., en route to mission area or returning to base). When designated as the mission commander (MC), the WSO is also responsible for all phases of the assigned mission, especially if there are multiple aircraft involved. For example, the aircraft pilot could be the junior member of a flight crew such as a first lieutenant or captain, and the weapon systems officer could be a senior officer such as a major, lieutenant colonel, or colonel; regardless of rank, the WSO would be the mission commander if they are qualified.

=== Training ===
Currently, all USN WSOs begin their training as student naval flight officers (SNFO) at NAS Pensacola, Florida. Training begins with Introductory Flight Screening, where the WSO flies a Cessna 172 or Piper PA-28 variant to show they are competent enough in aviation to continue the rigorous training ahead. Then the SNFO starts the U.S. Navy indoctrination course called Aviation Preflight Indoctrination (API) with their student naval aviator (pilot) counterparts. After six weeks of ground school and basic water survival training during API, future SWSOs (Student WSOs), at that point known as student naval flight officers (SNFO) check into the primary Training Squadron for SNFOs, the VT-10 Wildcats.

==== Primary ====
Training begins with several weeks of ground school followed by remnants of the "super-fo" program from the U.S. Navy where the SNFO takes front seat of the T-6 Texan II for six "contact" flights where the student will become familiar with the T-6. The SNFO is treated like a pilot training student for these six flights. After Contacts, the SNFO goes back to academics to learn instrument flying rules. Primary ends with a final instrument checkride. After primary the SNFO is compared to his or her shipmates and selected for either land-based naval aircraft or tailhook aircraft. Those SNFOs destined for the carrier-based E-2C or E-2D Hawkeye will be known as air control officers and combat information center officers, while those destined for the EA-18G Growler (USN only) will be electronic warfare officers (EWO). Those destined for the F/A-18F Super Hornet (USN Only) or the F/A-18D Hornet (USMC only) will become WSOs.

==== Intermediate ====
Intermediate picks up where Primary ends for USAF SWSOs. After the instrument phase of training, students move to visual navigation (VNAV) "low levels" at 2000'AGL, and finish in the T-6 with a final training block called "forms" (formation flying). Forms consist of four flights of learning the basics of close in formation flying. After forms, SWSOs head back to ground school to learn an entirely new aircraft, the USN T-39 Sabreliner. The T-39 is used as an intermediate instrument and low-level trainer for SWSOs, where they receive a total of eight flights. Students are required to learn the aircraft in a two-week ground school period before they go flight side. In contrast, T-6 ground school is four weeks. Training ends at either VT-10 or VT-4 with the "i-grad" ceremony and top graduate award.

==== Advanced ====
VT-86 is where all the training comes together to culminate in the SWSO receiving his or her wings of gold. In the T-45C, a USN single-engine jet trainer, SWSOs learn advanced instrument flying, radar navigation, and composite visual/radar navigation. SWSOs also receive instruction in Air-to-Ground strike training, Air-to-Air intercept training, Basic Fighter Maneuvering, and Close Air Support. A/G Training takes place on both VR and IR routes that criss-cross the south east United States. After completion of the syllabus, track selection takes place. Navy SWSOs select either the F/A-18F Super Hornet, or the E/A-18 Growler. Marine SWSOs by default select the F/A-18D Hornet. The final three months of some of the hardest training at Pensacola will leave the SWSO F/A-18 selectee with their wings of gold. Air Force WSOs no longer train at VT-86.

==== Graduate training ====
Following the winging ceremony, USN and USMC WSOs will proceed to a Fleet Replacement Squadron (FRS) and USAF WSOs to a Formal Training Unit (FTU) to complete advanced ground school and flight training to prepare them for their "operational" combat aircraft in the deployable operating forces.

Parachuting water survival
All USAF aviators with parachutes on the aircraft attend this three-day course at NAS Pensacola, Florida. During the course, USAF WSOs learn the basics of surviving an aircraft ejection over water, obtaining food and drinkable water when stranded at sea, combat evasion at sea, and how to be successfully rescued by boat or helicopter. For USN and USMC WSOs, this program was previously completed at NAS Pensacola during their Aviation Preflight Indoctrination (API) training.

Centrifuge training
This one-day course located at Brooks City-Base, San Antonio, Texas, tests USAF WSOs selected for the F-15E in their ability to withstand the g-forces routinely experienced by fighter aircrew.

SERE
The Survival, Evasion, Resistance and Escape (SERE) training course trains all USAF aircrew basic survival skills, combat evasion, and techniques to resist exploitation if captured. WSOs also learn how to survive an aircraft ejection over land. For USAF personnel, the three-week course is taught at Fairchild Air Force Base, Washington and the surrounding areas. The counterpart course for USN and USMC WSOs is taught at NAS North Island (academics) and Warner Springs, California (field exercise) for Pacific Fleet personnel and at Brunswick, Maine for Atlantic Fleet personnel.

IFF
USAF WSOs selected for the F-15E learn basic fighter maneuvers (BFM) and surface attack in the T-38C at Introduction to Fighter Fundamentals (IFF). WSOs complete this training at either the 435th Fighter Training Squadron at Randolph Air Force Base, Texas or the 49th Fighter Training Squadron at Columbus Air Force Base, Mississippi. WSOs also learn about the culture of being a young aircrew member in a USAF fighter squadron. The course lasts approximately eight weeks.

EWO
USAF WSOs selected for the B-1B, B-52H, and some F-15E selectees will become electronic warfare officers (EWOs) by attending this 12-week training program at the 563d Flying Training Squadron at Randolph Air Force Base, Texas. A similar program for USN EWOs in the EA-18G and USMC ECMOs in the EA-6B is conducted at the Center for Information Dominance at Corry Station, Florida. In both programs, students learn the basics of radar theory, electronic attack, and electronic defense.

== Gallery ==
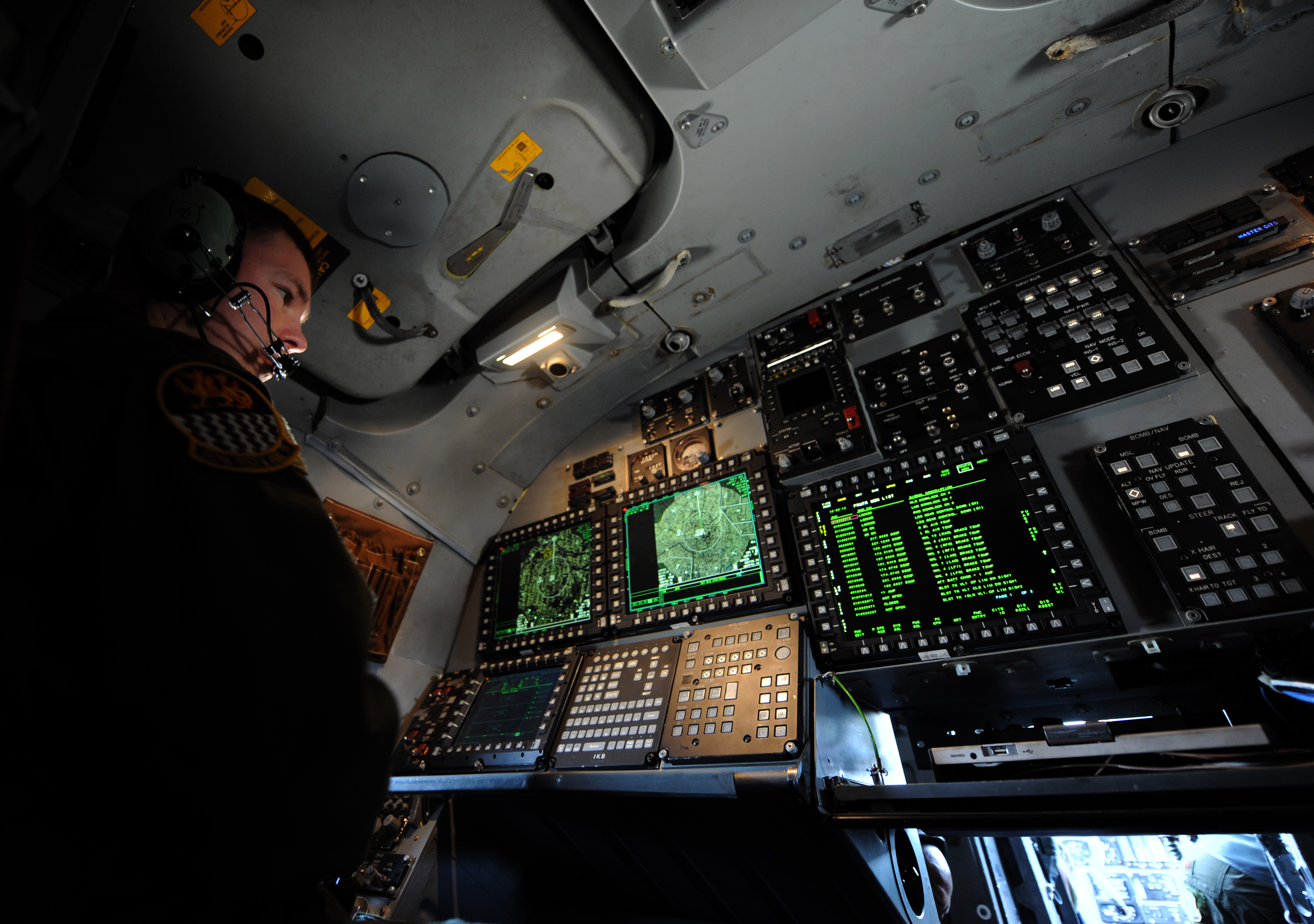
B-1B Lancer WSO

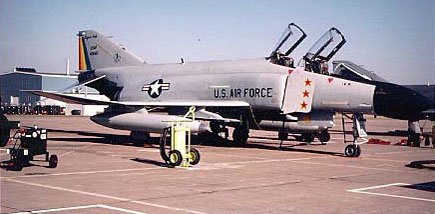
F-4 with tandem pilot and WSO canopies open

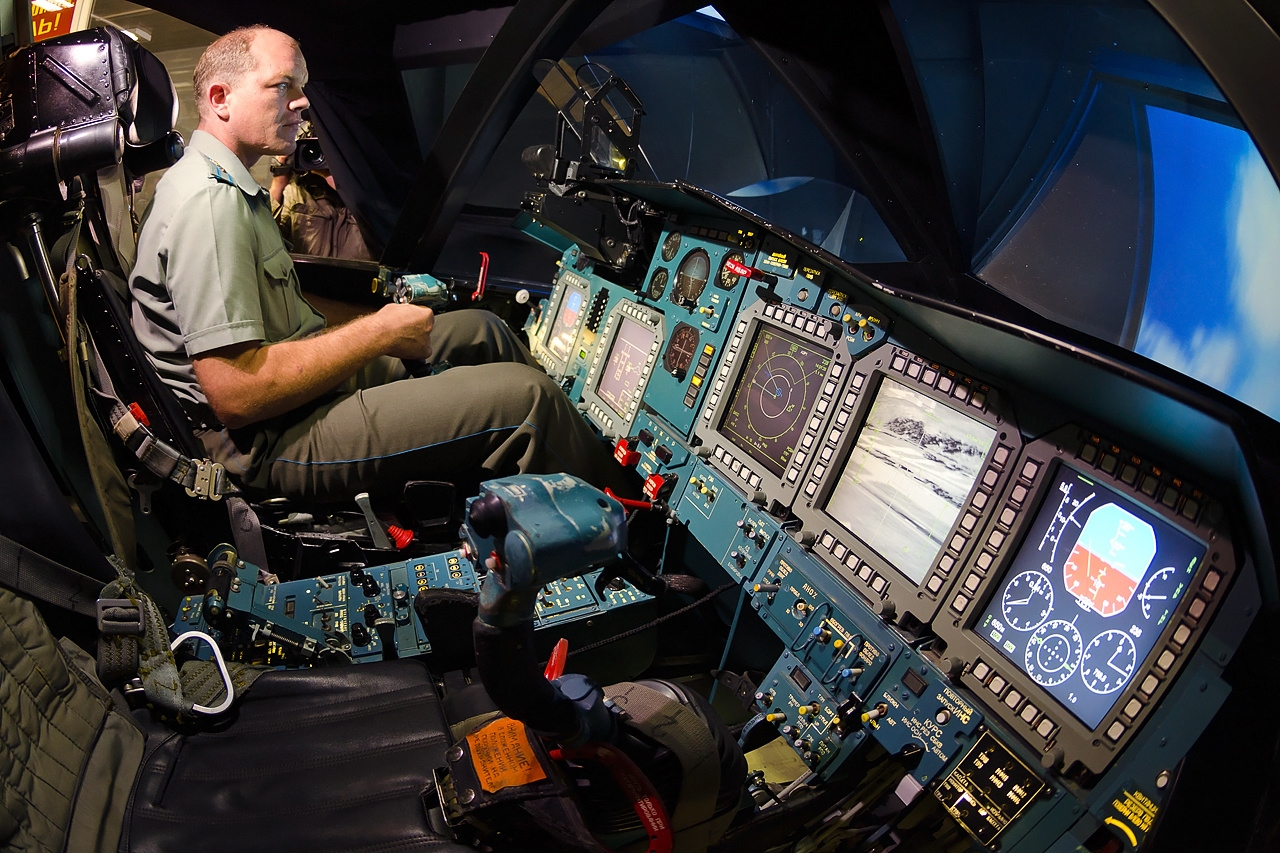
Su-34 pilot and WSO positions in simulator

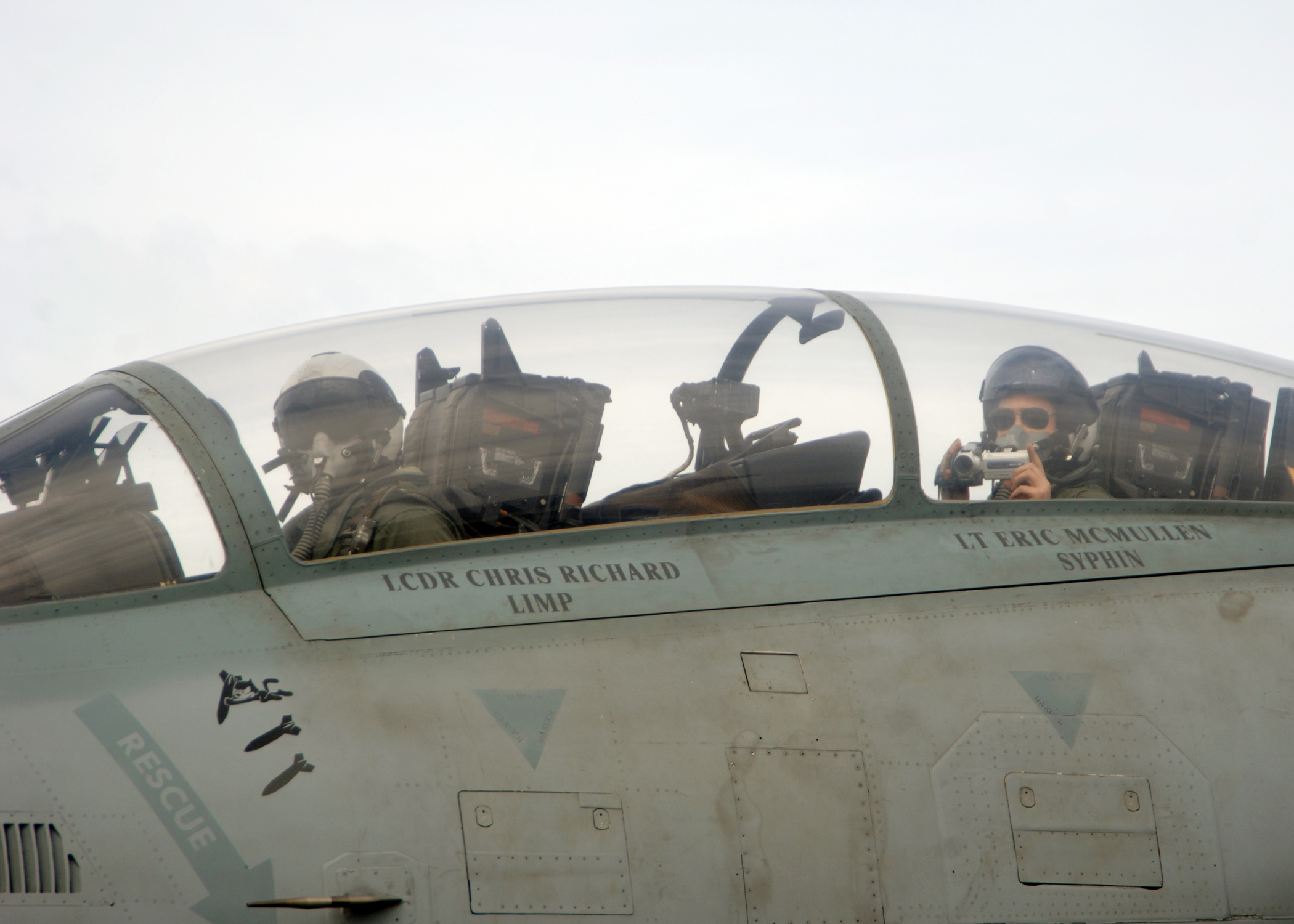
F-14 Pilot and RIO

== See also ==
- Aircrew (Flight crew)
- Combat Systems Officer
- Naval Flight Officer
