= VT-86 =

Training Squadron 86
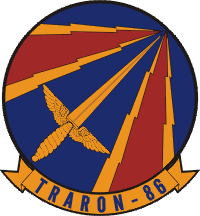
- VT-86 Insignia
- Country: United States of America
- Branch: United States Navy
- Type: Training
- Part of: Training Wing Six
- Garrison/HQ: NAS Pensacola
- Nickname: Sabrehawks
- Motto: "Training NFOs for the world"
- Colors: Red and Blue

Commanders
- Current commander: CDR Joseph "Bric" Seida, USN

Training Squadron EIGHT SIX (VT-86), also known as the "Sabrehawks," is a United States Navy advanced jet training squadron based at the Naval Air Station Pensacola, Florida. Training Squadron 86 is a tenant command of Training Air Wing 6. They are a training squadron flying the T-45C Goshawk. Their tailcode is F and their radio callsign is ROKT.

== History ==
Training Squadron 86 is known by several names: TRARON EIGHT SIX, VT-86, or the Sabrehawks, a name derived from its history of flying the T-39D/G/N Sabreliner and the TA-4J Skyhawk II. The squadron was established on 5 June 1972, under the operational control of Commander, Training Air Wing EIGHT (TRAWING 8) at Naval Air Station Glynco, Georgia. The mission of the new squadron was to conduct advanced Naval Flight Officer (NFO) training for the U.S. Navy and U.S. Marine Corps, which had previously been overseen by Naval Air Technical Training Center (NATTC) Glynco. The training was in four areas: Radar Intercept Officer, Basic Jet Navigation, Airborne Electronic Warfare and Airborne Tactical Data Systems. Training was conducted in aircraft previously assigned to and supported by NATTC Glynco until February 1973, when the squadron accepted 24 T-39 Sabreliners, 20 A-4C Skyhawks, 2 EC-121K Warning Stars, 12 TS-2A Tracker aircraft, and approximately 350 enlisted maintenance and support personnel from NATTC and NAS Glynco. After receiving the aircraft and personnel, the squadron's mission was expanded to include flight support for Air Intercept Control and Ground Controlled Approach training functions.

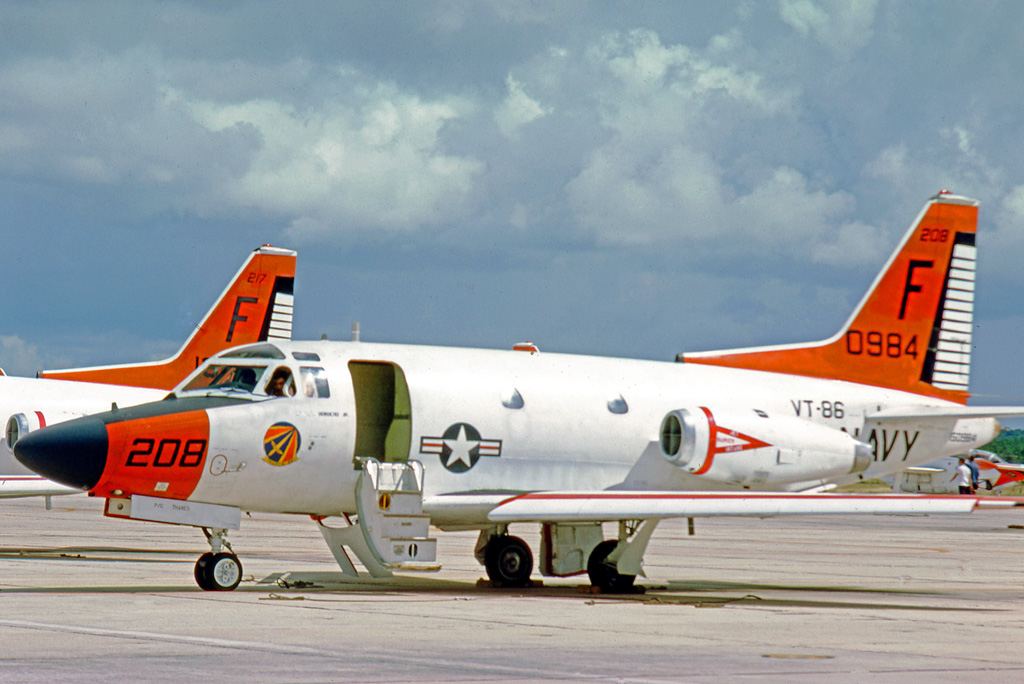
T-39D Sabreliner trainer of VT-86 at Pensacola NAS in 1975

Following a decision to close NAS Glynco and deactivate TRAWING 8 as part of post-Vietnam War defense budget reductions, a Sabrehawk detachment was established at Naval Air Station Pensacola, Florida in March 1974. On 1 June 1974, the squadron commenced flight operations at Naval Air Station Pensacola under the operational command of Commander, Training Air Wing SIX (TRAWING 6), training Naval Flight Officers for nearly all carrier-based aircraft.

Since its establishment, Training Squadron EIGHT SIX has received numerous awards to include multiple Meritorious Unit Commendations, the Training Effectiveness Award from the Chief of Naval Air Training (CNATRA), the CNATRA Retention Award, the Chief of Naval Operations Safety Award and 26 CNATRA Safety awards for accident-free operations. The squadron later amassed over 310,000 mishap-free flight hours and received the Admiral John H. Towers Safety Award and the Chief of Naval Education and Training (CNET) Shore/Technical Training Excellence Award.

In 1994, Training Squadron EIGHT SIX's role was expanded to include the training of U.S. Air Force Navigators/Combat Systems Officers (CSO) slated for eventual assignment as Weapon Systems Officers (WSO) in fighter and bomber aircraft. To date, the command has trained over 7,200 Naval Flight Officers for the U.S. Navy and U.S. Marine Corps and over 1,400 Navigators/Combat Systems Officers for the U.S. Air Force. Training of USAF students was discontinued in 2009 when the 479th Flying Training Group (479 FTG), a geographically separated unit of the 12th Flying Training Wing at Randolph AFB, Texas, was established at NAS Pensacola with T-6 Texan II and T-1A Jayhawk aircraft.

VT-86 has also historically provided training to international students. In 1996, VT-86's responsibilities also entailed training international officer students from Saudi Arabia, Italy, Singapore, and Germany; nearly 200 International Military Trainees have earned their wings through VT-86.

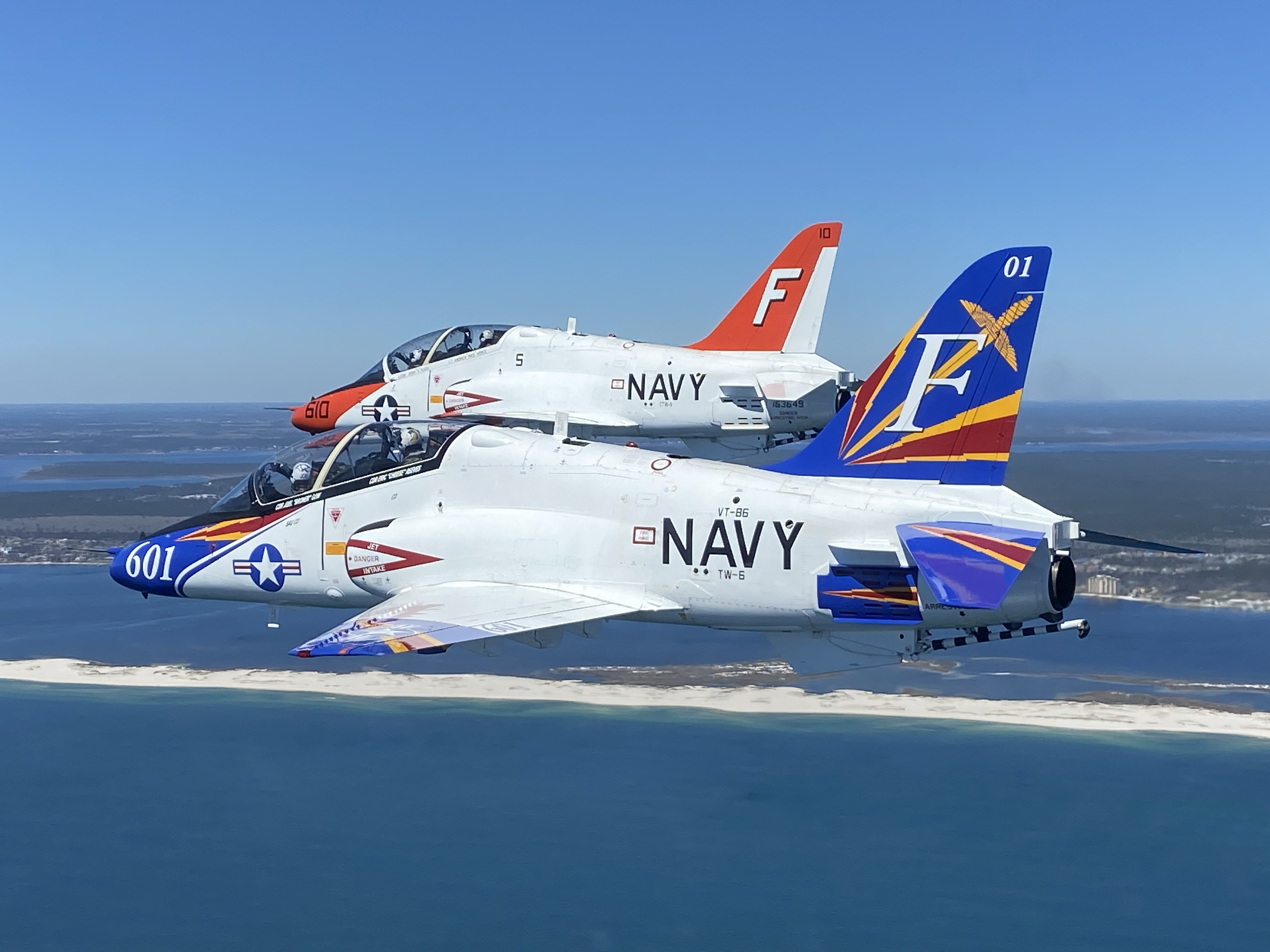
VT-86 T-45C Goshawks

Today, VT-86 trains Naval Flight Officers in the U.S. Navy's T-45C Goshawk. Retirement of the TA-4J Skyhawk II was completed in 1995, at which time the TA-4J was replaced in VT-86 by the T-2C Buckeye. Replacement of the T-2C, which preceded the T-45, was completed in September 2008.

Today, VT-86's mission is to provide advanced flight instruction to Student Naval Flight Officers (NFO) destined for strike fighter, bomber and electronic warfare aircraft in the U.S. Navy and U.S. Marine Corps, as well as continuing training for international students destined for similar aircraft. The squadron syllabus builds on that training previously received in the primary and intermediate NFO training squadrons, with additional emphasis on systems, instrument and radar navigation, radar intercept and attack, high-speed low-level flight, advanced aerial combat maneuvering and advanced communications.

Upon completion of VT-86's program, newly winged NFOs undergo further training at the respective Fleet Replacement Squadrons (FRS) for their new aircraft before reporting to their first operational Fleet squadron.

VT-86 has trained NFOs for many well-known retired aircraft such as the F-14 Tomcat, F-4 Phantom II, A-6 Intruder, EA-6B Prowler, RA-5C Vigilante, RF-4B Phantom II, S-3 Viking, ES-3 Shadow, and the A-3 Skywarrior (whose variants included the KA-3, EKA-3, ERA-3, EA-3 and TA-3). In addition, VT-86 has provided training for the still serving E-2 Hawkeye until that mission was assumed by the E-2 Fleet Replacement Squadrons in the mid-1970s when NAS Glynco closed and prior to the reestablishment of Training Squadron FOUR (VT-4) in that role.

Today, new Naval Flight Officers graduating from VT-86 fly either the Navy F/A-18F Super Hornet or the EA-18G Growler.

German Air Force (Luftwaffe) and German Navy (Deutsche Marine) Navigators/WSOs fly either the Panavia Tornado Interdictor/Strike (IDS) or Electronic Combat/Reconnaissance (ECR) variants, while some German Air Force WSOs will also fly the F-4 Phantom II.

Italian Air Force Navigators/WSOs fly the Panavia Tornado IDS and ECR variants.

Royal Saudi Air Force WSOs fly the F-15S Strike Eagle and the Panavia Tornado IDS and Air Defence (ADV) variants.

Republic of Singapore Air Force WSOs fly the F-16D Fighting Falcon or the F-15SG Strike Eagle.

Training squadron EIGHT SIX is staffed by approximately 80 U.S. Navy and U.S. Marine Corps officers. Additional instructor pilots, instructor NFOs and instructor WSOs augment VT-86 and are sourced from the TRAWING 6 staff, Naval Aviation Schools Command staff, and part-time Navy Reserve pilots and Navy Reserve NFOs embedded in TRAWING 6's and VT-86's respective Reserve Component units. German and Italian Navigator/WSO instructors also support VT-86 training operations, although they are administratively assigned to collocated German Air Force and Italian Air Force training squadrons at NAS Pensacola. With the ever-changing strategy of national defense for the United States and that of its NATO and Allied partners, VT-86 will continue to train Navy, Marine Corps and international officers in preparation for flying the world's most advanced and complex tactical combat aircraft.

VT-86 celebrated its 25th anniversary of mishap-free flying on 8 April 2002. Since its inception in June 1972, VT-86 had logged more than 332,000 mishap-free flight hours and has the distinction of maintaining the longest documented accident-free period of any active flying squadron in Naval Aviation history. This flight-hour total and cumulative time without mishaps also represents the longest mishap-free safety record in Naval Air Training Command history. Over the years, VT-86 has also earned twenty-seven Chief of Naval Air Training safety awards for accident-free operations and it also won the Admiral John H. Towers Safety Award in 1995. The 25 years of mishap-free flying 332,000 hours breaks down to more than 1,100 hours per month.

In May 2002, VT-86 suffered a fatal mishap when two T-39 aircraft collided while conducting training over the Gulf of Mexico. All students and instructors in both aircraft, a total of seven personnel, were killed. In January 2006, a T-39 from VT-86 crashed along a mountain ridgeline while conducting low level training in northwest Georgia and in April 2010, another T-39 from VT-86 crashed while conducting low level training near Fannin County, Georgia. There were no survivors in either mishap. On 4 November 2013, a T-45C assigned to VT-86 crashed at NAS Pensacola. The student and instructor survived and were taken to a local hospital.

In November 2014, VT-86 retired its last two T-39 Sabreliners, having flown the T-39 type/model since the squadron's establishment over 40 years earlier. Today, VT-86 conducts advanced SNFO training in a combination of simulators and the T-45C Goshawk aircraft.

CDR Nicholas E. “Rabbit” Alfano relieved CDR George "COB" Zintak as commanding officer of Training Squadron EIGHT SIX during a change of command ceremony held ashore at the Naval Air Station Pensacola, Florida, on May 5, 2022. CDR Zintak previously reported to the "Saberhawks" of Training Squadron (VT) 86 in November 2019 as the executive officer. He assumed command as commanding officer in March 2021, and has accumulated over 2,500 flight hours and 700 arrested landings as a weapon systems officer in the Boeing F/A-18F Super Hornet.

== General information ==
Upon graduation from Student NFO Primary Training at Training Squadron TEN (VT-10) at NAS Pensacola, students will follow certain follow-on training tracks, also known as "pipelines," similar to their Naval Aviator (pilot) peers.

USN and certain international students selected to fly multi-crew aircraft, such as the land-based P-8A Poseidon, P-3C Orion, EP-3E Aries, E-6B Mercury TACAMO aircraft, or the carrier-based E-2C Hawkeye or E-2D Hawkeye aircraft, will report to Training Squadron FOUR (VT-4) at NAS Pensacola for Advanced Student NFO Training in the Multi-Crew Simulator (MCS) System. There they will all complete a core syllabus followed by platform-specific training. Upon graduation, USN students receive their wings as NFOs and report to their respective Fleet Replacement Squadron (FRS) for follow-on training in their particular Fleet aircraft. International students receive the wings of their nation/service and also report to follow-on training with either a U.S. Navy FRS or with an equivalent type unit with their nation/service.

USN, USMC and other international students destined for strike and strike fighter aircraft will complete an Intermediate NFO Training syllabus in the T-6A at VT-10. This is followed by reassignment to VT-86 and Advanced Training in either the Strike syllabus for students destined for the USN EA-18G Growler or USMC EA-6B Prowler aircraft, or the Strike Fighter syllabus for students destined for the USN F/A-18F Super Hornet, USMC F/A-18D Hornet, or similar NATO/Allied strike fighter aircraft. Both syllabi at VT-86 utilize the Virtual Mission Training System (VMTS) with a synthetic radar in the T-45C Goshawk aircraft. Upon graduation, the USN and USMC students also receive their wings as NFOs and report to their respective FRS for follow-on training in their particular Fleet aircraft. International students receive the wings of their nation/service and also report to follow-on training with either a U.S. Navy or U.S. Marine Corps FRS, a U.S. Air Force Formal Training Unit (FTU), or with an equivalent type unit with their nation/service.

- The radio callsign for VT-86 is ROKT (Rocket).

== Aircraft flown ==
=== Present ===
- McDonnell Douglas/Boeing T-45C Goshawk

=== Past ===
- T-39N/G Sabreliner
- Douglas / McDonnell Douglas TA-4J Skyhawk II
- T-47A Citation II
- T-39D Sabreliner
- Lockheed EC-121K Warning Star
- Grumman TS-2A Tracker
- North American Rockwell T-2 Buckeye
- Vought F-8 Crusader

== See also ==
- History of the United States Navy
- List of United States Navy aircraft squadrons
