= VT-10 =

Training Squadron TEN
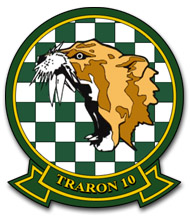
- VT-10 Insignia
- Active: 1960 - present
- Country: United States of America
- Branch: United States Navy
- Type: Training
- Garrison/HQ: NAS Pensacola
- Nickname: Wildcats
- Mottos: "Once a wildcat, always a wildcat"
- Colors: Green and White
- Mascot: Wildcat

Commanders
- Current commander: CDR A.J. "Maestro" Fortier, USN

Training Squadron TEN (VT-10) is a training squadron of the United States Navy. The squadron is homebased at NAS Pensacola, Florida.

== General information ==
- Basic and intermediate flight school for Naval Flight Officers (NFO). VT-10 is tasked with training to go to advanced flight school in the United States Navy. NFOs come to VT-10 after graduating from Naval Introductory Flight Evaluation, or "NIFE".
- In recent years the syllabus has been expanded to include all aspects of pilot training, up to but not including solo flight. The NFO training consists of navigation, communications, formation flying, low-level flight operations, amongst other smaller curricula.
- VT-10 is a subordinate command to Training Air Wing 6 (TRAWING SIX).
- The "Cosmic Cats" was the nickname for the squadron for many years, until it was deemed in the early 1990s to not be very aggressive. The Wildcat patch and name came to the front, and have been used almost exclusively.
- For many years, the Squadron's main focus was on the safety of its instructors and students. The motto was adopted "If there is doubt, there is no doubt."
- The squadron is homebased at NAS Pensacola, Florida, originally known as Forrest Sherman Field, named after former CNO Admiral Forrest Sherman.
- The squadron's radio callsign is KATT.

== Aircraft Flown ==
- UC-45J Navigator
- T-2A Buckeye
- T-1A Sea Star
- T-39D SabreLiner
- TF-9J Cougar
- T-2B Buckeye
- T-34C Turbo Mentor
- T-47A Citation
- T-1A Jayhawk
- T-6A Texan II

== Awards ==
Training Squadron TEN has been awarded five Meritorious Unit Commendations and four Chief of Naval Education and Training "Shore/Technical Training Excellence Awards", the most recent in 2005. "Wildcat" safety initiatives have earned the squadron twenty one Chief of Naval Operations Safety Awards including one in 2005. The squadron was awarded the Towers Award for safety in 1978 and the Grandpaw Pettibone Safety Award in 2004 and 2005. VT-10's extensive energy conservation efforts and improved efficiency enabled the squadron to receive the 1995 and 1996 Secretary of the Navy Energy Conservation Awards. In 2005, VT-10 was presented with the VADM Robert Goldthwaite Award for Training Excellence, the squadrons fourth such award. VT-10's resourceful use of "Self Help" to significantly improve facilities resulted in the squadron being awarded the Chief of Naval Operations Bronze Hammer Award for 2000.

== History ==
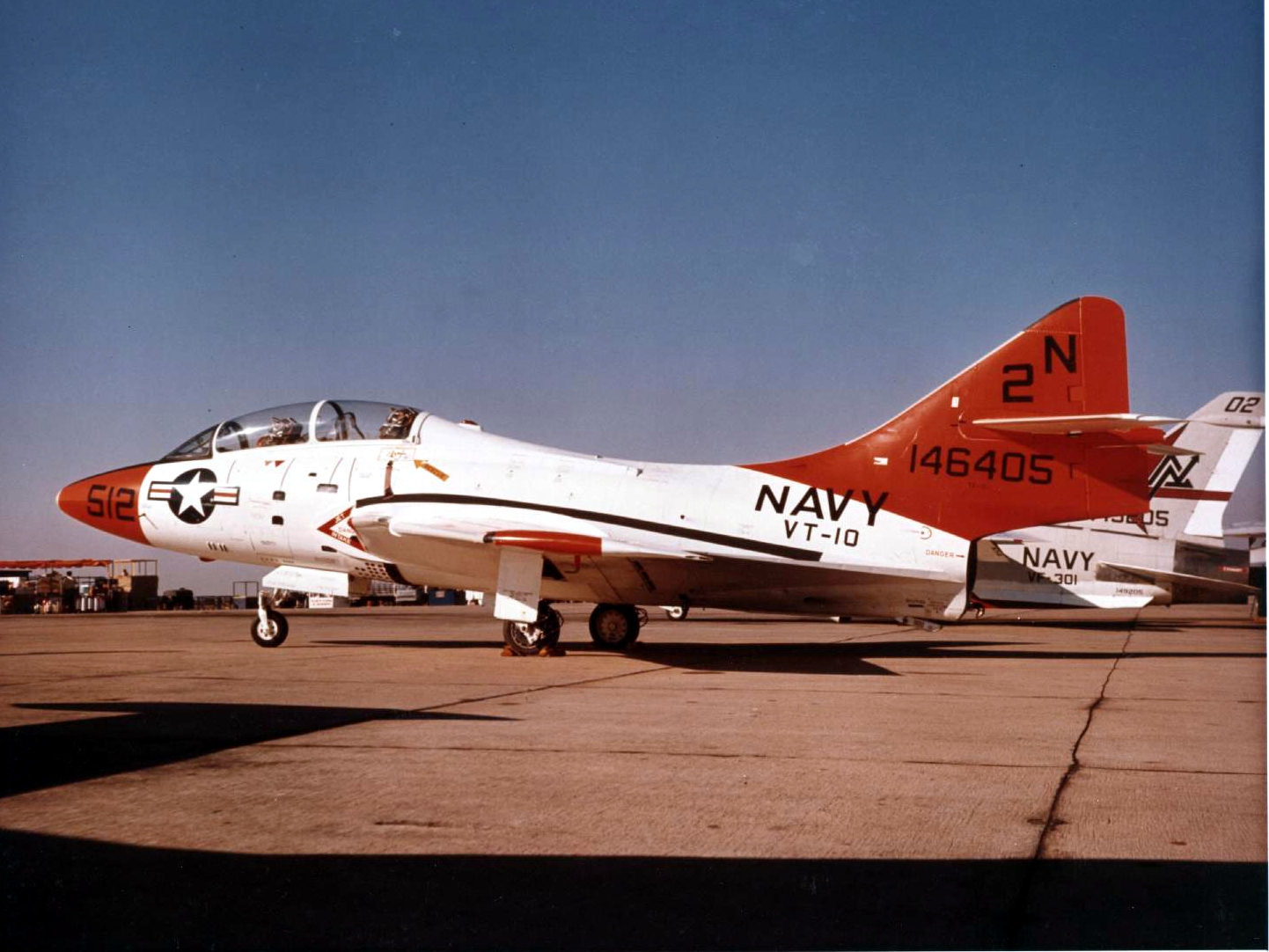
A VT-10 TF-9J Cougar at NAS Miramar, 1973.

In 1960, Training Squadron TEN (VT-10) was established as a division of the Training Department of NAS Pensacola and was known as the Basic Naval Aviation Officers (BNAO) School. BNAO was developed in response to (1) the increasing importance of navigator and radar operator-type flying officers in the latest generation of multi-seat naval aircraft such as the A-3 Skywarrior, A-5 Vigilante, A-6 Intruder, F-4 Phantom II and P-2 Neptune and (2) in order to create a more standardized training program that better approximated that given to Student Naval Aviators. Until early 1962, BNAO was strictly a ground training operation for prospective Naval Aviation Observers who would receive follow on training at a Fleet Replacement Air Group (RAG) in an operational Fleet combat aircraft and would then receive their NAO wings following conclusion of a training syllabus. Evaluating the lack of training aircraft in the BNAO syllabus as inadequate, the school was assigned nine UC-45J "Navigators" and six T-2A "Buckeyes" in February 1962. The T-2As were soon replaced with nine T-1A "Sea Star" aircraft. In 1965, Naval Aviation Observers were re-designated as Naval Flight Officers (NFOs), and in 1968, BNAO School was officially established as Training Squadron TEN (VT-10).

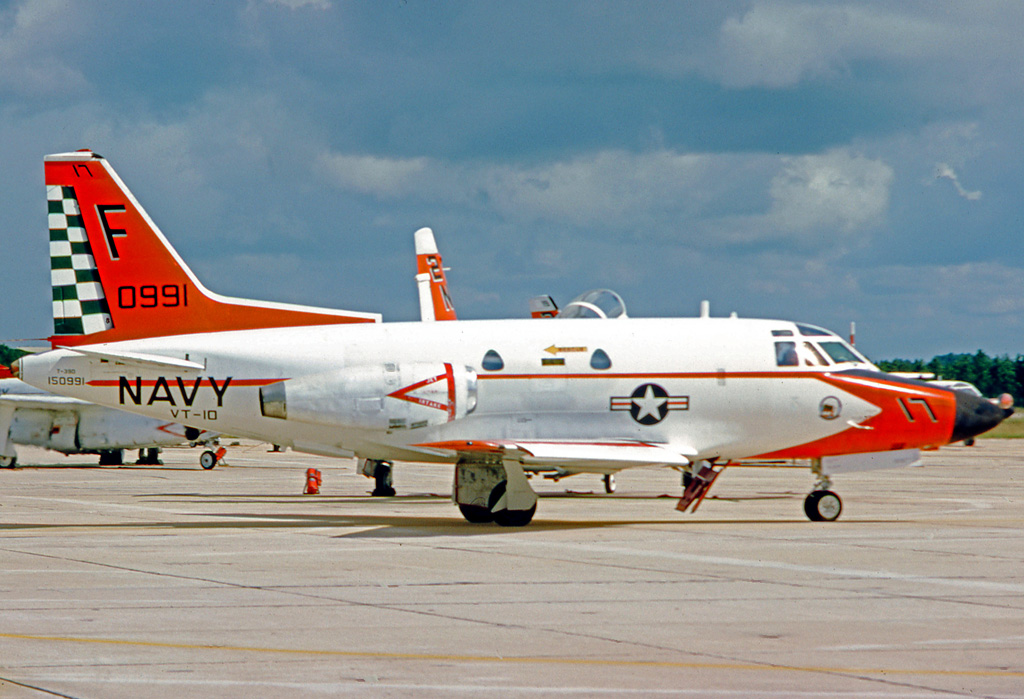
T-39D Sabreliner of VT-10 at NAS Pensacola in 1975

By November 1970, Training Squadron TEN had trained over 6,000 student NFOs. In 1971, Training Squadron TEN transitioned to the T-39D "Sabreliner" jet trainer and the TF-9J "Cougar" which was replaced two years later by the newer T-2C "Buckeye."

The squadron doubled in size between 1972 and 1974 to accommodate an increased training requirement, maintaining 40 aircraft: ten T-39Ds and thirty T-2Cs. During the 1970s several flight ground trainers were introduced to the syllabus, including the 1D23 NAV/comm trainer, the 2F90 instrument trainer, and the 2F101 flight simulator. In 1981, a reassignment of aircraft within NATRACOM replaced VT-10's T-2C aircraft with T-2Bs. The squadron revised its training in 1984 and acquired twenty T-34C "Turbo Mentors"; and the Cessna T-47As replaced the T-39Ds in 1985.

During 1991, revolutionary changes were made to the NFO syllabus. To improve NFO air sense and situational awareness, forty additional flight hours were placed in the curriculum allowing instruction in basic piloting skills including aerobatics, takeoffs, and landings. The same year, the squadron replaced the T-47A with the T-39N which had upgraded avionics and radar. The T-2Bs and the air combat maneuvering syllabus were transferred to Training Squadron EIGHTY-SIX (VT-86). At the same time VT-10 acquired twenty additional T-34Cs and two new 2B37 instrument trainers for primary and intermediate training.

In 1994, the first U.S. Air Force instructors and student navigators (NAVs) reported to Training Squadron TEN under a joint memorandum of agreement between the services. The agreement included the 1996 transition from the T-39N to the Air Force T-1A "Jayhawk" as the training platform for the Intermediate syllabus events. In April 1996, VT-10 split instructor and student assets to assist in the establishment of Training Squadron FOUR (VT-4) as a second NFO/NAV Primary/Intermediate Training Squadron. In 1999 the T-39G/N was re-integrated into the NFO intermediate training syllabus as the training platform for Navy and International Students with the T-1 remaining as the training platform for Air Force and Marine Corps Students. In April 2004 VT-10 flew its last T-39G/N sortie with the T-1 taking over as the primary training platform for all VT-10 student NFO intermediate training syllabus flights. In October 2010, the T-39G/N replaced the T-1 in the NFO intermediate syllabus. On 3 December 2010, VT-4 was deactivated and VT-10 became the sole NFO primary and intermediate training squadron.

VT-10 has a 60-member Navy and Marine Corps instructor staff that currently trains over 300 NFOs annually. In 1997, command of VT-10 began alternating between Navy and Air Force Officers. That alternating command ceased when the Air Force ended the joint training at TRAWING SIX and established its own separate combat systems officer training group at Pensacola.

Upon graduation from the Primary or Intermediate phases of flight training, students proceed to follow-on training according to branch of service and ultimate operational aircraft:

- Navy:
  - VT-86 at NAS Pensacola, FL for EA-6B, EA-18G, and F/A-18F
  - VT-4 (reactivated in 2013 as an advanced training squadron) at NAS Pensacola, FL for P-3C, EP-3, P-8A, E-6B Mercury and E-2C / E-2D
- Marine Corps:
  - VT-86 at NAS Pensacola, FL for F/A-18D and EA-6B

In January 2003, VT-10 initiated instructor orientation flights in the T-6A "Texan II", the joint Air Force/Navy platform slated to replace the T-34C "Turbomentor" as the primary phase syllabus trainer. The T-6A "Texan II", is a single engine, two-seat trainer, which is fully aerobatic. It features a pressurized cockpit, a G-tolerance enhancement system and dual zero-zero ejection seats. The T-6A utilizes a state-of-the-art digital cockpit, to help familiarize students with what they will encounter in their fleet tours.

In August 2003, VT-10 marked its first training flight in the T-6A Texan II. The first student class consisted of 4 Navy, 1 Marine and 1 Air Force students who received over 180 hours of academic training, 27 hours of simulator training, and 60 hours of actual flight time.

In April 2005, VT-10 completed the transition to the T-6 and flew its last T-34C "Turbomentor" student sortie. VT-10 conducted two detachments to Key West NAS, one detachment to Randolph AFB, TX, as well as two separate hurricane evacuations when hurricanes Dennis and Katrina made landfall on the Gulf Coast. The squadron implemented the Joint Primary Aircraft Training System (JPATS) format for training and rewrote T-6A course-ware to reflect the first major change in Naval Aviation grading philosophy in a generation; the Multi-Service Navigator Training System (MNTS).

During 2013, students at VT-10 started following a new curriculum, the Undergraduate Military Flight Officer (UMFO) program.

== See also ==
- History of the United States Navy
- List of United States Navy aircraft squadrons
- List of Inactive United States Navy aircraft squadrons
