= 10th Group =

10th Group may refer to:

- 10th Group CIS, a unit of the Belgian Army mural
- 10th Special Forces Group (United States), a unit of the United States Army

== See also ==
- Tenth Army (disambiguation)
- X Corps (disambiguation)
- 10th Division (disambiguation)
- 10th Brigade (disambiguation)
- 10th Regiment (disambiguation)
- 10 Squadron (disambiguation)
