= Naval flight officer =

Commissioned officer in the US Navy or Marine Corps

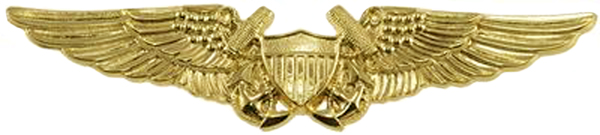
The warfare designation insignia of a naval flight officer

A naval flight officer (NFO) is a commissioned officer in the United States Navy or United States Marine Corps who specializes in airborne weapons and sensor systems. NFOs are not pilots, but they may perform many "co-pilot" or "mission specialist" functions, depending on the type of aircraft. Until 1966, their duties were performed by both commissioned officers known as Naval Aviation Officers (NAO) and senior enlisted personnel known as Naval Aviation Observers (NAO).

In 1966, enlisted personnel were removed from naval aviation observer duties. The principal catalyst for this action was due to many of the aircraft that NAOs flew having nuclear weapons missions and concerns within the OPNAV staff and the Office of the Secretary of Defense over enlisted personnel having the ability to release/drop nuclear weapons. The enlisted NAOs continued to serve in enlisted Naval Aircrewman roles while NAO officers received the newly established Naval Flight Officer (NFO) designation, and the NFO insignia was introduced. NFOs in the U.S. Navy begin their careers as unrestricted line officers (URL), eligible for command at sea and ashore in the various naval aviation aircraft type/model/series (T/M/S) communities and, at a senior level, in command of carrier air wings and aircraft carriers afloat and functional air wings, naval air stations and other activities ashore. They are also eligible for promotion to senior flag rank positions, including command of aircraft carrier strike groups, expeditionary strike groups, joint task forces, numbered fleets, naval component commands and unified combatant commands.

A small number of U.S. Navy NFOs have later opted for a lateral transfer to the restricted line (RL) as aeronautical engineering duty officers (AEDO), while continuing to retain their NFO designation and active flight status. Such officers are typically graduates of the U.S. Naval Test Pilot School and/or the U.S. Naval Postgraduate School with advanced academic degrees in aerospace engineering or similar disciplines. AEDO/NFOs are eligible to command test and evaluation squadrons, naval air test centers, naval air warfare centers, and hold major program management responsibilities within the Naval Air Systems Command (NAVAIR).

Similarly, U.S. Marine Corps NFOs are also considered eligible for command at sea and ashore within Marine aviation, and are also eligible to hold senior general officer positions, such as command of Marine aircraft wings, Marine air-ground task forces (MAGTFs), joint task forces, Marine expeditionary forces, Marine Corps component commands and unified combatant commands.

The counterpart to the NFO in the United States Air Force is the combat systems officer (CSO), encompassing the previous roles of USAF navigator, weapon systems officer and electronic warfare officer. Although NFOs in the Navy's E-2 Hawkeye aircraft perform functions similar to the USAF air battle manager in the E-3 Sentry AWACS aircraft, their NFO training track is more closely aligned with that of USAF combat systems officers.

The United States Coast Guard had a short-lived NFO community in the 1980s and 1990s when it operated E-2C Hawkeye aircraft on loan from the Navy. Following a fatal mishap with one of these E-2C aircraft at the former Naval Station Roosevelt Roads, Puerto Rico, the Coast Guard returned the remaining E-2Cs to the Navy and disestablished its NFO program.

== Training ==
=== Overview ===
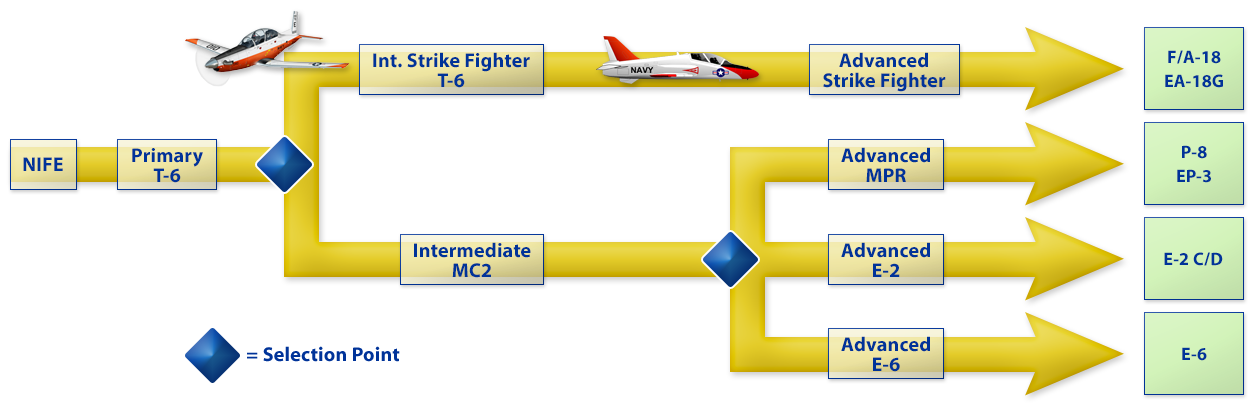
NFO Training Pipeline

Training for student NFOs (SNFOs) starts out the same as for student naval aviators (SNAs), with the same academic requirements and nearly identical physical requirements. The only real distinction in physical requirements is that SNFOs may have less than 20/40 uncorrected distance vision. Both SNAs and SNFOs complete Naval Introductory Flight Evaluation (NIFE) at Naval Aviation Schools Command (NAVAVSCOLSCOM) at Naval Air Station Pensacola, Florida before splitting off into different primary training tracks.

The SNFO program has continued to evolve since the 1960s. Today, SNFOs train under the Undergraduate Military Flight Officer (UMFO) program at Training Air Wing 6 at NAS Pensacola, alongside foreign students from various NATO, Allied and Coalition navies and air forces. All Student NFOs begin primary training at Training Squadron TEN (VT-10), flying the T-6A Texan II trainer, eventually moving on to advanced training at Training Squadron 4 (VT-4) or Training Squadron 86 (VT-86). Upon graduation from their respective advanced squadron, students receive their "wings of gold" and are designated as naval flight officers. After winging, students conduct follow-on training at their respective fleet replacement squadron (FRS) before proceeding to their initial operational assignments in combat coded, deployable fleet aviation squadrons for what is nominally a three year assignment during which time they will become Mission Commander qualified in their respective fleet aircraft.

=== NFO training squadrons ===
Squadron Name	Insignia	Nickname	Aircraft	Notes
VT-4		Warbucks	Multi-Crew Simulator (MCS)	NFO Advanced Maritime Command and Control (MC2); NAS Pensacola
VT-10		Wildcats	T-6A	NFO Primary/Intermediate; NAS Pensacola
VT-86		Sabrehawks	T-45C	NFO Advanced Strike; NAS Pensacola

=== Naval Introductory Flight Evaluation ===
All SNFOs and SNAs start their aviation training with naval introductory flight evaluation (NIFE). NIFE consists of several phases: academics, ground school, flight training, and physiology. The academics portion spans three weeks and covers aerodynamics, engines, FAA rules and regulations, navigation, and weather. Academics phase is followed by one week of ground school. Every student then enrolls in one of two civilian flight schools located near NAS Pensacola. Students complete approximately 9 hours of flight training in a single engine aircraft. NIFE flights can be waived based on proficiency for students entering training with a private pilot license. After the flight phase, students will complete training in aerospace physiology, egress, and water & land survival.

=== Primary ===
After completing NIFE, all SNFOs report to VT-10 under Training Air Wing 6 to begin primary training. All training in VT-10 is done in the Beechcraft T-6A Texan II and consists of two stages (each stage consist of ground school, simulator events, and flight events):

- Familiarization Stage (aircraft systems, emergency procedures, basic communication, take-off/landing, ELPs, spins, precision aerobatics, course rules)
- Navigation Stage (Instrument and visual flight procedures, airway navigation, tactical route construction)

After graduating from Primary, SNFOs will select between multi crew aviation or strike aviation. (Note: Marine SNFOs can only select carrier aviation.) Students selected for multi-crew training (E-2 Hawkeye, P-8A Poseidon, E-6B Mercury) will continue on to the Maritime Command and Control (MC2) curriculum at VT-4. Those that select strike aviation will continue to Intermediate training and remain at VT-10.

=== Intermediate ===
SNFOs destined for carrier-based strike fighter and electronic attack aircraft remain in VT-10 and continue to fly in the T-6A Texan II. Training consists of four stages:

- Single ship instrument stage (building upon instrument procedures in primary 1 and 2, VFR pattern, GPS navigation)
- Section instrument stage (instrument flying in formation)
- Tactical formation stage (rendezvous, tactical formation, tail-chase)
- Section visual navigation stage (visual navigation flying in formation)

=== Maritime Command and Control (MC2) ===
After primary, students who have selected E-2, P-8 or E-6s check into VT-4 for Maritime Command and Control (MC2) training. The MC2 program was developed to allow SNFOs to receive advanced platform-specific training while still at NAS Pensacola, and to receive their wings before progressing to their respective fleet replacement squadron (FRS) for training in their ultimate operational combat aircraft. All MC2 training is conducted in the Multi-Crew Simulator (MCS), a new simulator system that allows students to train independently, as a single-ship crew, or as a multi-ship mission. MC2 training has two phases: Intermediate and Advanced. Advanced phases are specific to the selected platform and consist of Advanced Maritime Patrol and Reconnaissance (P-8A Poseidon), Advanced Strategic Command and Control (E-6B Mercury) and Advanced Airborne Command and Control (E-2 Hawkeye).

==== MC2 Intermediate ====
SNFOs begin MC2 training in the MC2 Intermediate syllabus. These classes include a combination of SNFOs who selected "big wing" aviation out of VT-10 Primary training. Training in this phase builds upon the instrument training from Primary and includes:

- Operational flight planning, instruments, and navigation (international flight rules and TACAN navigation)
- Communications and navigation systems (comm systems and INS, GPS, and RADAR theory and navigation)
- Sensor and link operations (RADAR, IFF, and IR theory and data link employment)
- Fleet operations

Upon completion of MC2 Intermediate, SNFOs will select between E-2C/D Hawkeyes, P-8A Poseidons or E-6B Mercurys. From there all SNFOs remain at VT-4 for Advanced training in their respective pipelines.

==== Advanced MC2 ====
Advanced MC2 training is platform-specific training in VT-4 via the MCS, allowing SNFOs destined for the carrier-based E-2 community or the land-based P-8 or E-6 communities to begin learning their responsibilities on their fleet aircraft. The development of this program relieves the associated fleet replacement squadrons from teaching SNFOs the basics of naval aviation and to focus more on advanced fleet tactics, thus streamlining FRS training, reducing costs and increasing training effectiveness and efficiency and providing fleet with better-trained, mission-capable NFOs. Upon completion of advanced stage training, students receive their "wings of gold" and are designated as naval flight officers.

SNFOs progress through one or two of four strands, depending on what platform they select.

Advanced Airborne Command and Control consists of:

- Airborne early warning (E-2 capabilities and mission overview)
- Air intercept control (airborne battlefield command and control, tactics, and strike techniques)

Advanced Maritime Patrol and Reconnaissance consists of:

- Surface search and littoral surveillance (community overview, target identification, sensor employment)
- Electronic warfare and acoustic operations (EW introduction, sonar theory)
- Maritime patrol and reconnaissance (coordinated operations)

Advanced Strategic Command and Control consists of:

- Strategic operations (community overview, operations, strategic command structure)
- Strategic communications and procedures

=== Advanced strike ===
SNFOs report to VT-86 and fly the T-45C Goshawk. Training consists of five phases:

- Contact phase (T-45 systems, emergency procedures, carrier operations, night operations, communications)
- Strike phase (air-to-ground radar, low level flying, mission planning, fuel awareness)
- Close air support phase (CAS procedures and communications)
- Basic fighter maneuver phase (BFM practice)
- All weather intercepts phase (air-to-air radar, air intercepts, GPS)

After graduating from advanced strike training, Navy SNFOs will select:

- EA-18G Growler
- F/A-18F Super Hornet

Marine SNFOs will select:

- F/A-18D Hornet

== Comparison with naval aviators ==
Naval flight officers operate some of the advanced systems on board most multi-crew naval aircraft, and some may also act as the overall tactical mission commanders of single or multiple aircraft assets during a given mission. NFOs are not trained to pilot the aircraft, although they do train in some dual-control aircraft and are given the opportunity to practice "hands on controls" basic airmanship techniques. Some current and recently retired naval aircraft with side-by-side seating are also authorized to operate under dual-piloted weather minimums with one pilot and one NFO. However, in the unlikely event that the pilot of a single piloted naval aircraft becomes incapacitated, the crew would likely eject or bail out, if possible, as NFOs are not qualified to land the aircraft, especially in the carrier-based shipboard environment.

NFOs serve as weapon systems officers (WSOs), electronic warfare officers (EWO), electronic countermeasures officers (ECMO), tactical coordinators (TACCO), bombardiers, and navigators. They can serve as aircraft mission commanders, although in accordance with the OPNAVINST 3710 series of instructions, the pilot in command, regardless of rank, is always responsible for the safe piloting of the aircraft.

Many NFOs achieve flight/section lead, division lead, package lead, mission lead and mission commander qualification, even when the pilot of the aircraft does not have that designation. Often, a senior NFO is paired with a junior pilot (and vice versa). NFO astronauts have also flown aboard the Space Shuttle and the International Space Station as mission specialists and wear NFO-astronaut wings.

Like their naval aviator counterparts, NFOs in both the Navy and Marine Corps have commanded aviation squadrons, carrier air wings, shore-based functional air wings and air groups, Marine aircraft groups, air facilities, air stations, aircraft carriers, amphibious assault ships, carrier strike groups, expeditionary strike groups, Marine aircraft wings, Marine expeditionary forces, numbered fleets, and component commands of unified combatant commands. Three NFOs have reached four-star rank, one as a Marine Corps general having served as the Assistant Commandant of the Marine Corps, and the other two as Navy admirals, one having served as Vice Chief of Naval Operations before commanding U.S. Fleet Forces Command & U.S. Atlantic Fleet, U.S. Pacific Command (USPACOM) and U.S. Central Command (USCENTCOM), and the other having commanded U.S. Pacific Command, having previously commanded U.S. Pacific Fleet. Another former NFO who retrained and qualified as a Naval Aviator also achieved four-star rank as a Marine Corps general, commanded U.S. Strategic Command (USSTRATCOM) and later served as Vice Chairman of the Joint Chiefs of Staff (VCJCS).

In some quarters, NFO careers may be viewed more restrictive than their Naval Aviator (e.g., pilot) counterparts. For example, NFOs only serve aboard multi-crew naval aircraft and as certain multi-crew aircraft are retired from the active inventory, NFOs can become displaced, as happened with the withdrawal of the A-3 and EA-3, A-5 and RA-5, A-6, EA-6A, EA-6B, F-4 and RF-4, F-14, S-3 and ES-3 from active service. In addition, as avionics have become more advanced, the need for some multi-crew aircraft using one or more NFOs has been reduced.

However, the majority of NFOs (as well as Naval Aviators) from aircraft being retired have historically been afforded the opportunity to transition to another aircraft platform, such as F-4 and F-14 transitions to the F/A-18D and F/A-18F, A-6 transitions to the F-14, EA-6B, S-3, and F/A-18D, S-3 transitions to the P-3/P-8, E-2, E-6, and F/A-18F, EA-6B transitions to the EA-18G, and P-3 and EP-3 transitions to the P-8. Although it is true that Naval Aviators can also transition their piloting expertise into civilian careers as commercial airline pilots and that NFOs are not able to similarly translate their skills into this career field unless augmented by associated FAA pilot certificates, the military aviation career opportunities of NFOs remain on par with their Naval Aviator counterparts, as do their post-military career prospects in the civilian sector in defense, aviation & aerospace, as well as other career pursuits beyond that of civilian commercial airline pilot.

== Notable NFOs ==
Vice Admiral Walter E. "Ted" Carter Jr. became the 62nd superintendent of the U.S. Naval Academy on July 23, 2014. He graduated from the U.S. Naval Academy in 1981, was designated a Naval Flight Officer in 1982, and graduated from the U.S. Navy Fighter Weapons School (TOPGUN) in 1985. Carter's career as an aviator includes extensive time at sea, deploying around the globe in the F-4 Phantom II and the F-14 Tomcat. He has landed on 19 different aircraft carriers, to include all 10 of the Nimitz class carriers. Carter flew 125 combat missions in support of joint operations in Bosnia, Kosovo, Kuwait, Iraq and Afghanistan. He accumulated 6,150 flight hours in F-4, F-14, and F/A-18 aircraft during his career and safely completed 2,016 carrier-arrested landings, the record among all active and retired U.S. Naval Aviation designators.

As a captain, Rear Admiral Richard Dunleavy was the first NFO to command an aircraft carrier, the USS Coral Sea (CV 43). He previously flew the A-3 Skywarrior, A-5 Vigilante, RA-5C Vigilante and A-6 Intruder. Later in his career, he was promoted to rear admiral and vice admiral, and was the first NFO to hold the since disestablished position of Deputy Chief of Naval Operations for Air Warfare (OP-05). He retired in 1993 as a Rear Admiral.

Rear Admiral Stanley W. Bryant was the first NFO selected for the Navy's Nuclear Power Program as a Commander in 1986. As a Captain, he became the first NFO to command a nuclear aircraft carrier when he took command of USS Theodore Roosevelt (CVN 71) in July 1992. In his first posting following promotion to Flag rank, he became the first NFO and first carrier aviator to command the Iceland Defense Force in Keflavik, Iceland in 1994. He was the first NFO appointed to the position of Deputy Commander (then DCINC), U.S. Naval Forces Europe and retired from that position in 2001.

Commander William P. Driscoll was the first NFO to become a flying ace, having achieved five aerial kills of VPAF fighter aircraft during the Vietnam War. Driscoll received the service's second-highest decoration, the Navy Cross, for his role in a 1972 dogfight with North Vietnamese MiGs. Driscoll separated from active duty in 1982 but remained in the United States Naval Reserve, flying the F-4 Phantom II and later the F-14 Tomcat in a Naval Air Reserve fighter squadron at NAS Miramar, eventually retiring in 2003 with the rank of Commander (O-5).

Admiral William Fallon, an NFO who flew in the RA-5C Vigilante and the A-6 Intruder, was the first NFO to achieve four-star rank. As a three-star vice admiral, he was the first NFO to command a numbered fleet, the U.S. 2nd Fleet. He later served in four separate four-star assignments, to include command of two unified combatant commands. This included service as the 31st Vice Chief of Naval Operations from October 2000 to August 2003; the Commander, U.S. Fleet Forces Command and U.S. Atlantic Fleet from October 2003 to February 2005; Commander, U.S. Pacific Command (USPACOM) from February 2005 until March 2007; and Commander, U.S. Central Command (USCENTCOM) from March 2007 until his retirement in March 2008.

Captain Dale Gardner was the first NFO to qualify and fly as a NASA Mission Specialist astronaut aboard the Space Shuttle Challenger on mission STS-8. He previously flew the F-14 Tomcat. He retired in 1990.

Rear Admiral Benjamin Thurman Hacker was the first NFO flag officer, having been selected in 1980. He previously flew the P-2 Neptune and P-3 Orion. He retired in 1988.

Admiral Harry B. Harris Jr., was the last Commander, U.S. Pacific Command (USPACOM) prior to its re-designation as U.S. Indo-Pacific Command (USINDOPACOM). He was the first NFO from the land-based maritime patrol aviation community to command a numbered fleet, the U.S. 6th Fleet, and later commanded the U.S. Pacific Fleet. He is also the first member of the Navy's land-based maritime patrol aviation community, pilot or NFO, to promote to four-star rank. He previously flew the P-3C Orion and retired in 2018.

Vice Admiral David C. Nichols was the deputy coalition air forces component commander (deputy CFACC) during Operation Enduring Freedom and Operation Iraqi Freedom. He was the first NFO to command the Naval Strike and Air Warfare Center, the second NFO to command a numbered fleet, the U.S. 5th Fleet, and was later deputy commander of U.S. Central Command. He previously flew the A-6 Intruder and retired in 2007.

General William L. Nyland, USMC was the first Marine Corps NFO to achieve four-star rank as Assistant Commandant of the Marine Corps. As a lieutenant general, he was also the first NFO to serve as deputy commandant for aviation. He previously flew the F-4 Phantom II and the F/A-18 Hornet. He retired in 2005.

Lieutenant General Terry G. Robling, USMC was the first Marine Corps NFO to command United States Marine Corps Forces, Pacific following an assignment as the deputy commandant for aviation. He previously flew the F-4 Phantom II and the F/A-18 Hornet. He retired in 2014.

Vice Admiral Nora W. Tyson was the Commander, United States Third Fleet from 2015 to 2017, and previously Deputy Commander, U.S. Fleet Forces Command. She was the first female NFO to command a warship, the amphibious assault ship USS Bataan (LHD 5), and the first female naval officer to command an aircraft carrier strike group, Carrier Strike Group Two, aboard the USS George H.W. Bush (CVN 77). She previously flew the land-based EC-130Q Hercules and the E-6 Mercury TACAMO aircraft. She was the first woman to command a U.S. Navy fleet, the U.S. 3rd Fleet. She retired in 2017.

Colonel John C. Church Sr., USMC was the first NFO to command a Marine F-4 squadron. He commanded VMFA-115, the Silver Eagles, from 1983 to 1984. As a Captain, Colonel Church, "the Silver Fox", had previously served with VMFA-115 during the Vietnam War, during which time he and his pilot, Captain James "Rebel" Denton, were shot down and subsequently rescued. Colonel Church amassed more than 500 missions in the F-4. He retired in 1990.

== Fleet ==
Eligible fleet platforms for NFOs are as of May 2026 are as follows:

- E-2C/D Hawkeye
- F/A-18F Super Hornet
- EA-18G Growler
- EP-3E Aries II
- P-8A Poseidon
- E-6B Mercury
- MQ-4C Triton (unmanned aircraft, remotely piloted)
  - The MQ-4C is not an "initial entry" aircraft for NFOs and is typically operated by more senior NFOs who have previously qualified in the P-3, EP-3, and/or P-8.

In the EA-18G Growler, NFOs are designated as electronic warfare officers (EWOs) and may also be mission commanders.

In the E-2C Hawkeye and E-2D Advanced Hawkeye, NFOs are initially as designated radar officers (RO), then upgrade to air control officers (ACO) and finally to combat information center officers (CICO) and CICO/mission commanders (CICO/MC).

In the E-6B Mercury, NFOs are initially designated as airborne communications officers (ACOs), then upgrade to combat systems officers (CSOs), and finally to mission commanders (CSO/MC).

In the F/A-18D Hornet, the NFO position is known as the weapon systems officer (WSO) and may also be mission commander qualified. Flown only within the U.S. Marine Corps, the last Marine Corps officers to be assigned to the F/A-18D as WSOs received their NFO wings in 2022. The F/A-18D will be eventually replaced in Marine Corps service with the single-seat, STOVL, F-35B Lightning II.

In the F/A-18F Super Hornet, the NFO position is known as the weapon systems officer (WSO) and may also be mission commander qualified.

In the P-8A Poseidon, the NFO is initially designated as a co-tactical coordinator (COTAC) and upgrades to tactical coordinator (TACCO) and then TACCO/mission commander (TACCO/MC).

A single USN or USMC NFO is assigned to the United States Navy Flight Demonstration Squadron, the Blue Angels, as "Blue Angel #8", the Events Coordinator. This is an operational flying billet for this officer and he or she previously flew the twin-seat F/A-18D "Blue Angel 7" aircraft (which had replaced the F/A-18B previously used), and now flies the twin-seat F/A-18F "Blue Angel 7" aircraft with the team's advance pilot/narrator. They function as the advance liaison (ADVON) at all air show sites and the events coordinator provides backup support to the narrator during all aerial demonstrations.

NFOs have also served as instructors in the twin-seat F-5F Tiger II at the Navy Fighter Weapons School (now part of the Naval Aviation Warfighting Development Center (NAWDC)) and as instructors in twin-seat F/A-18Bs and F/A-18Fs in USN and USMC F/A-18 fleet replacement squadrons and the Navy Fighter Weapons School (NFWS, also known as TOPGUN). They have also flown a number of USAF and NATO/Allied aircraft via the U.S. Navy's Personnel Exchange Program (PEP), to include, but not limited to, the USAF F-4 Phantom II, F-15E Strike Eagle and E-3 Sentry, the Royal Air Force Buccaneer S.2, Tornado GR1/GR1B/GR4/GR4A and Nimrod MR.2, and the Royal Canadian Air Force CP-140 Aurora.

In all, the specific roles filled by an NFO can vary greatly depending on the type of aircraft and squadron to which an NFO is assigned.

== Past aircraft ==
NFOs also flew in these retired aircraft, including as mission commander:

- EA-1F (formerly AD-5Q) Skyraider serving as electronic warfare officer/electronic countermeasures operator.
- A-3 (formerly A3D-1, A3D-2, A3D-2P, A3D-2Q and A3D-2T) Skywarrior (e.g., A-3B, EA-3B, ERA-3B, EKA-3B, TA-3B and VA-3B) serving as bombardier/navigator, navigator, electronic countermeasures/electronic warfare officer, and EWO signals evaluator.
- A-4 Skyhawk as students in the TA-4J, as TOPGUN adversary instructors in the TA-4F and TA-4J, as forward air controllers in the OA-4M (USMC only), and as electronic warfare officers in the EA-4F.
- A-5A (formerly A3J-1), A-5B (formerly A3J-2) and RA-5C (formerly A3J-3P) Vigilante serving as bombardier/navigator in the A-5A and A-5B and reconnaissance/attack navigator in the RA-5C.
- A-6 Intruder (e.g., A-6A, A-6B, A-6C, KA-6D, A-6E, A-6F) serving as bombardier/navigator (USN + USMC).
- EA-6A Prowler serving as electronic countermeasures officer (USN + USMC).
- EA-6B Prowler serving as electronic countermeasures officer (USN + USMC).
- EA-7L Corsair II as electronic countermeasures officer.
- C-130F Hercules serving as navigator.
- EC-130Q Hercules "TACAMO" aircraft serving as navigator and airborne communications officer.
- LC-130 Hercules serving as navigator.
- E-1B (formerly WF-2) Tracer serving as radar intercept controllers.
- EC-121 (formerly WV-2 and WV-3) Warning Star as navigator and electronic warfare officer.
- EF-10 (formerly F3D-2Q) Skynight as electronic warfare officer (USMC only).
- F-4 (formerly F4H-1) Phantom II (e.g., F-4B, F-4J, F-4N, F-4S) serving as radar intercept officer (USN + USMC)
- EF-4B and EF-4J Phantom II serving as electronic warfare officer.
- RF-4B (formerly F4H-1P) Phantom II serving as reconnaissance systems officer (USMC only).
- F-14 Tomcat (e.g., F-14A, F-14B, F-14D) serving as radar intercept officer
- OV-10 Bronco (OV-10A, OV-10D, OV-10D+, OV-10G) serving as aerial observer and forward air controller (USMC only).
- SP-2E/H (formerly P2V-5 and P2V-7) Neptune (e.g., SP-2E, SP-2H, EP-2E, OP-2E, AP-2H, LP-2H) serving as navigator and tactical coordinator.
- SP-5B (formerly P5M) Marlin serving as navigator and tactical coordinator.
- S-3 Viking (S-3A and S-3B) serving as tactical coordinator (TACCO) and co-pilot/tactical coordinator (COTAC).
- ES-3A Shadow serving as electronic warfare officer and co-pilot/electronic warfare officer.
- WP-3A Orion serving as navigator.
- RP-3A and RP-3D Orion serving as navigator and ocean projects coordinator (OPC).
- EP-3E and EP-3J Orion serving as navigator and electronic warfare officer (EWO), to include EWO Signals Evaluator (SEVAL).
- P-3A, P-3B and P-3B TACNAVMOD Orion, and P-3C Orion serving as navigator/communicator (NAV/COMM)and tactical coordinator (TACCO).

NFOs have also served as instructors/mission commanders in since retired training aircraft such as the UC-45 Expeditor, T-29 Flying Classroom, several variants of the T-39 Sabreliner, the TC-4C Academe, T-47A Citation II and the USAF T-43A Bobcat.

== Popular culture ==
- One of the key characters in the popular film Top Gun is LTJG Nick "Goose" Bradshaw, played by Anthony Edwards, an F-14 radar intercept officer (RIO) teamed with his pilot, LT Pete "Maverick" Mitchell, played by Tom Cruise. Several others were LTJG Ron "Slider" Kerner, RIO to LT Tom "Iceman" Kazansky; LT Sam "Merlin" Neills, LT Bill "Cougar" Cortell's RIO; and LTJG Leonard "Wolfman" Wolfe, LT Rick "Hollywood" Neven's RIO. LTJG Marcus "Sundown" Williams (played by Clarence Gilyard Jr.) is the RIO of LTJG Charles "Chipper" Piper (played by Adrian Pasdar) and served as Maverick's RIO right after the latter went back to operational flight status following the accident that led to Goose's death.
- In the film Flight of the Intruder, Willem Dafoe played LCDR Virgil "Tiger" Cole, who served as an A-6 B/N (bombardier/navigator) with his pilot, LT Jake "Cool Hand" Grafton, played by Brad Johnson.
- In the film Behind Enemy Lines, Owen Wilson played LT Chris Burnett, a weapon systems officer in an F/A-18F Super Hornet.
- In the film Top Gun: Maverick, several actors portray F/A-18F weapon systems officers, to include Lewis Pullman as LT Robert "Bob" Floyd, Danny Ramirez as LT Mickey "Fanboy" Garcia, Jake Picking as LT Brigham "Harvard" Lennox, and Kara Wang as LT Callie "Halo" Bassett. During the film, numerous flashbacks and references are also made to the deceased F-14 radar intercept officer, LTJG Nick "Goose" Bradshaw, as played by Anthony Edwards in the 1986 Top Gun film as the RIO and close friend of then-LT, now CAPT Pete "Maverick" Mitchell as played by Tom Cruise, and as the late father of F/A-18E pilot LT Bradley "Rooster" Bradshaw as played by Miles Teller.

== See also ==
- Naval aviator insignia
- United States Marine Corps aviation
- List of United States Navy aircraft squadrons
- List of United States Marine Corps aircraft squadrons
- NATOPS
