= X-wing (disambiguation) =

The X-wing fighter is a starfighter from the fictional Star Wars universe.

X-wing may also refer to:

== Star Wars ==
- Star Wars: X-Wing (video game series), a series of space-based flight simulators
  - Star Wars: X-Wing (video game), the first game in the series
- Star Wars: X-wing (book series), a novel series by Michael A. Stackpole and Aaron Allston
- Star Wars: X-Wing Miniatures Game, a 2012 board game published by Fantasy Flight Games
- Star Wars: X-wing – Rogue Squadron, a comic book series

== Aviation ==
- 10th Wing (disambiguation)
- X-Wing, an experimental Sikorsky S-72 aircraft
- Cruciform wing, a wing configuration shaped like an X
- Xwing (aviation), an autonomous aviation company
- Eagle Aircraft X-Wing, the prototype of the Eagle Aircraft X-TS

== Other uses ==
- X-wing, a style of aerodynamics devices on Formula One racing cars
- X-wing, a pattern in sudoku puzzles
- Skystorm X-Wing Chopper, a fictional vehicle in the G.I. Joe universe, piloted by the Windmill figure
- "X-Wing", a song by Denzel Curry from the 2022 album Melt My Eyez See Your Future

== See also ==
- X (disambiguation)
- Ten (disambiguation)
- Wing (disambiguation)
