= 10th Engineer Brigade =

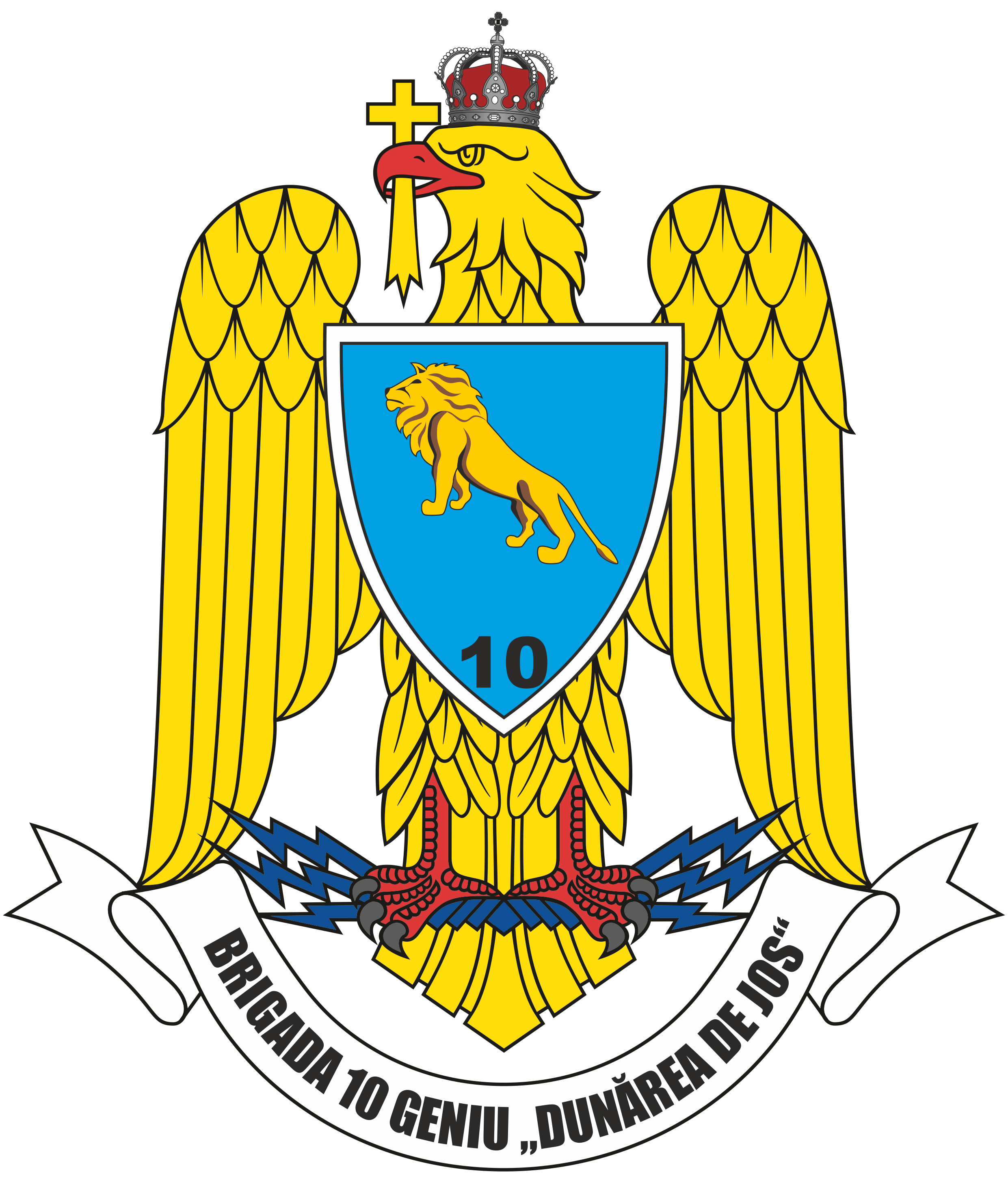
10th Engineer Brigade Official Insignia

The 10th Engineer Brigade "Dunărea de Jos" (Brigada 10 Geniu "Dunărea de Jos") is an engineer brigade currently operational within the Romanian Land Forces, and subordinated to the General Staff of the Romanian Land Forces.

== Organization ==
- 10th Engineer Brigade "Dunărea de Jos", in Brăila
  - 2nd Explosive Ordnance Disposal (EOD) Group, in Bucharest, with Cougar JERRV and CALIBER T5
  - 5th Explosive Ordnance Disposal (EOD) Group, in Brăila, with Foster-Miller TALON
  - 52nd Engineer Battalion "Tisa", in Satu Mare
  - 72nd Engineer Battalion "General Constantin Savu", in Brăila (Bridging)
  - 96th Engineer Battalion "Joseph Kruzel", in Bucharest (Bridging)
  - 136th Engineer Battalion "Apulum", in Alba Iulia (Bridging)
  - River Crossing Battalion, in Brăila
  - 110th Logistic Support Battalion "Mareșal Constantin Prezan", in Brăila
  - 102nd Reconnaissance Company
  - 106th Support Company

=== Organization 2012 ===
- 10th Engineer Brigade in Brăila
  - 52nd Engineer Battalion "Tisa" in Satu Mare
  - 72nd Engineer Battalion "Matei Basarab" in Brăila
  - 136th Engineer Battalion "Apulum" in Alba Iulia
  - River Crossing Battalion in Brăila
  - 110th Logistic Battalion in Brăila

== Decorations ==
The 10th Engineer Brigade has received the following decorations:

- Order of Military Virtue, Peacetime (Knight – 2007; Officer – 2017; Commander – 2024)
