= Novy Dvor, Minsk district rural council =

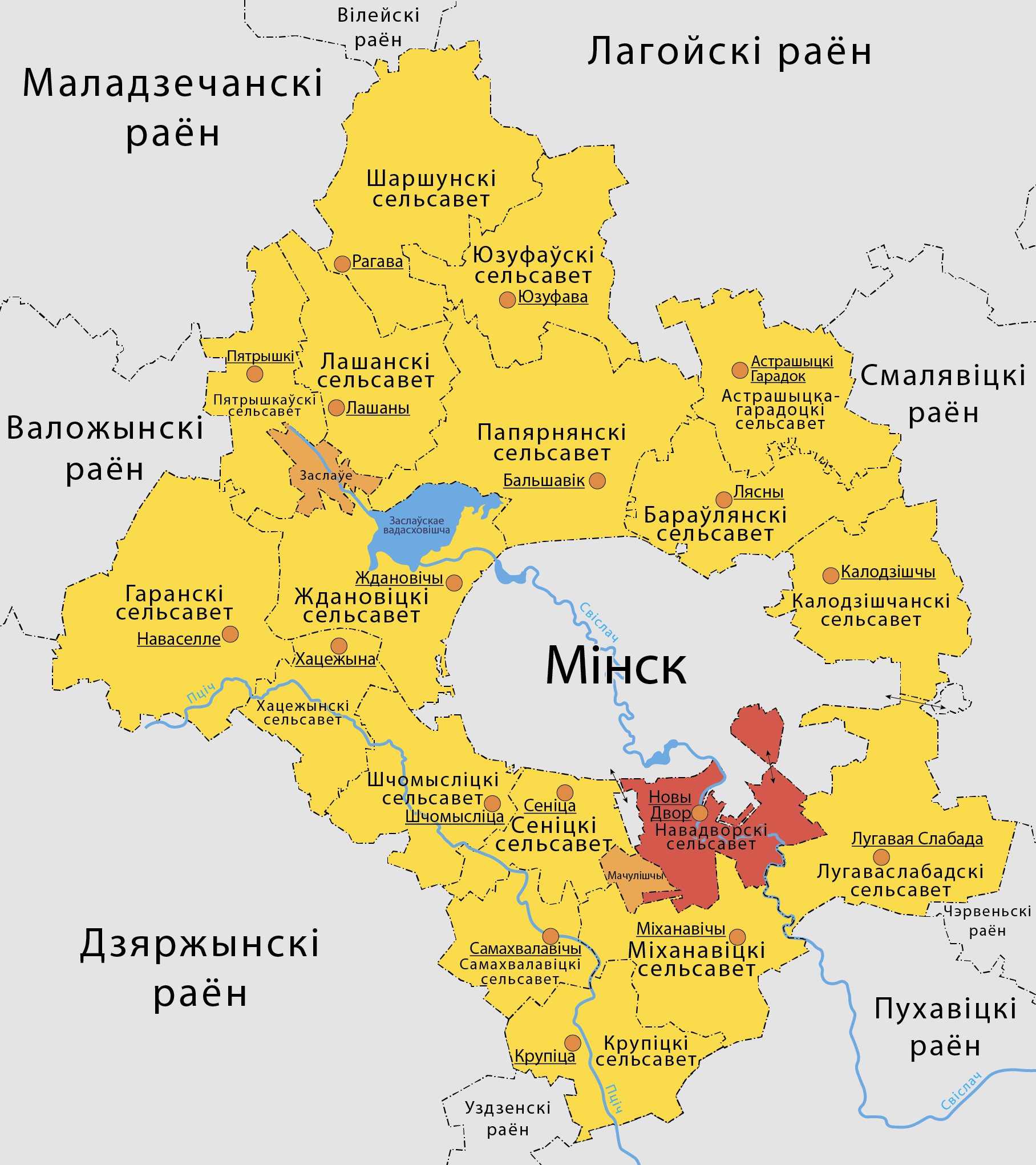
Map of Minsk District

Novy Dvor rural council (Belarusian: Навадворскі сельсавет; Russian: Новодворский сельсовет) is a lower-level subdivision (selsoviet) of Minsk district, Minsk region, Belarus. Its administrative center is the agrotown of Novy Dvor.

== Rural localities ==
The populations are from the 2009 Belarusian census (14179 total) and 2019 Belarusian census (18396 total)

Russian name	Belarusian name	Pop. 2009	Pop. 2019
д Большое Стиклево	в Вялікае Сціклева	1434	1566
д Большой Тростенец	в Вялікі Трасцянец	2527	3847
аг Гатово	аг Гатава	7308	9013
д Дергаи	в Дзергаі	13	27
д Дубки	в Дубкі	15	29
д Ельница	в Ельніца	593	1002
д Климовичи	в Клімавічы	193	224
д Королищевичи	в Каралішчавічы	546	671
д Мацевичи	в Мацавічы	79	90
аг Новый Двор (Novy dvor)	аг Новы Двор (Novy Dvor)	1133	1630
д Осеевка	в Асееўка	36	38
д Пашковичи	в Пашкавічы	158	136
д Подлосье	в Падлоссе	69	59
д Цесино	в Цэсіна	75	64
