= 10th Landwehr Division =

- 10. Landwehr-Division
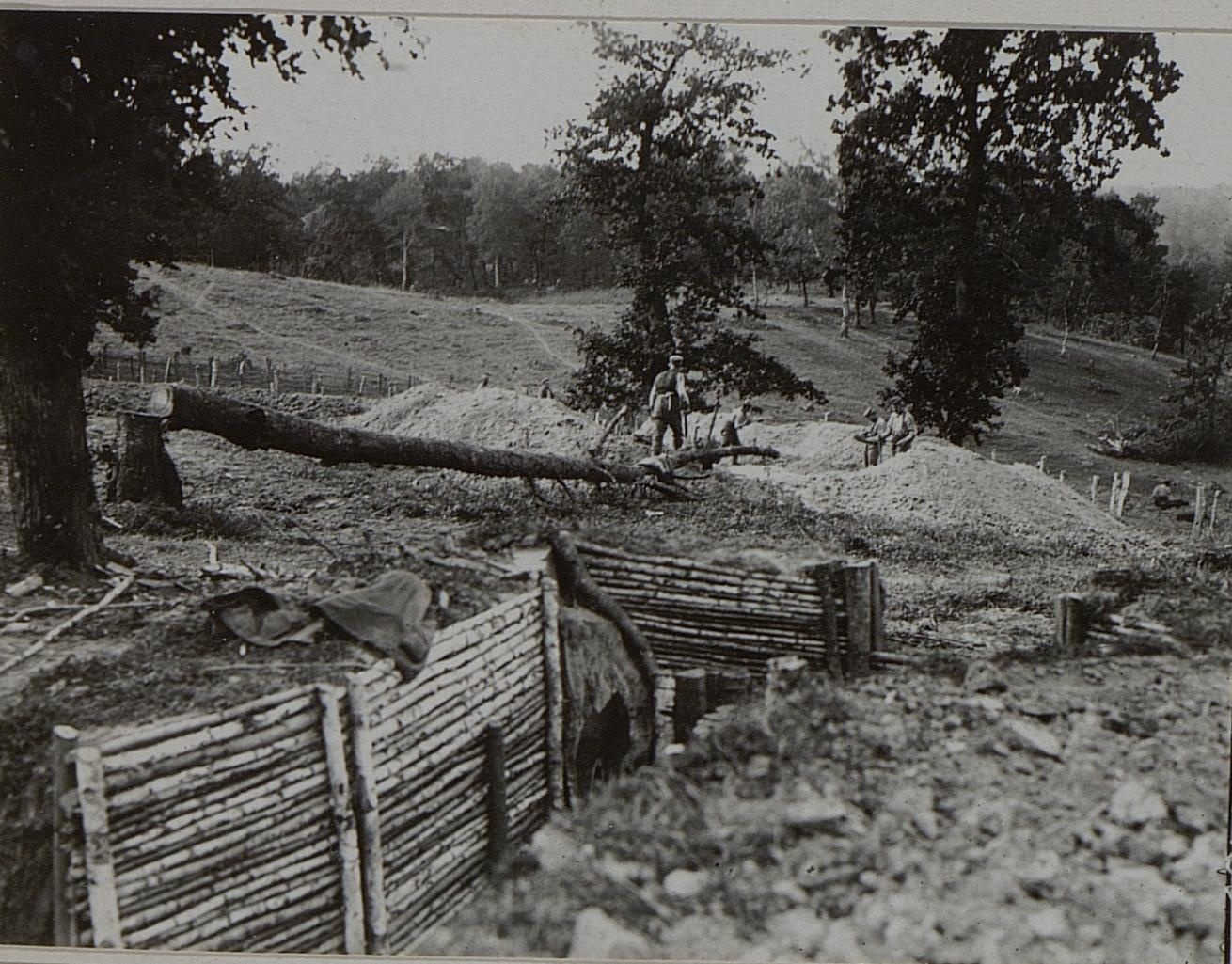
- Active: World War I
- Country: German Empire
- Allegiance: Imperial German Army

The 10th Landwehr Division (10. Landwehr-Division) was a unit of the Imperial German Army in World War I.
