= 10th Garrison Division of Shenyang Military Region =

213th Army Division (1961-64) 1st Independent Division of Jilin Provincial Military District (1964–76) Independent Division of Jilin Provincial Military District (1966–76) 10th Garrison Division o Shenyang Military Region(1980-92)
- Active: 1961.2 - 1992.10
- Country: People's Republic of China
- Branch: People's Liberation Army
- Type: Division
- Role: Mountain Infantry
- Part of: 16th Army

The 213th Army Division (Chinese: 陆军第213师) was created in February 1962 in Shenyang Military Region. It was a mountain infantry unit operating in Paektu Mountain region. On December 28, 1964, the division was renamed as 1st Independent Division of Jilin Provincial Military District (Chinese: 吉林省军区独立第1师). In this role it was headquartered in Antu County and came under command of the Jilin Provincial Military District, based in Changchun.

On February 29, 1976, it was further renamed as Independent Division of Jilin Provincial Military District(Chinese: 吉林省军区独立师) after the disbandment of 2nd Independent Division of Jilin Provincial Military District.

On October 31, 1980, a battalion from the Tank Regiment, 3rd Garrison Division of Shenyang Military Region was expanded as Tank Regiment of Independent Division and attached.

On December 31, 1980, the division was renamed as 10th Garrison Division of Shenyang Military Region(Chinese: 沈阳军区守备第10师). From December 1981 the division was under the control of 68th Army Corps. By then the division was composed of:

- 28th Garrison Regiment;
- 29th Garrison Regiment;
- 30th Garrison Regiment;
- Tank Regiment;
- Artillery Regiment.

In 1985 it was transferred to 16th Army after 68th Army Corps' disbandment.

On October 3, 1985, the divisional HQ moved to Yanji, Jilin. On November 6 its tank regiment was reduced as Independent Tank Battalion.

From 1990 the division was transferred to Jilin Provincial Military District's control.

The division was disbanded in October 1992.
