= 10th Tank Division (Soviet Union) =

- 10-я танковая дивизия
- Active: 1940 - 1941
- Country: Soviet Union
- Allegiance: Red Army
- Branch: Army
- Type: Tank
- Garrison/HQ: Kiev Military District
- Equipment: T-34
- Engagements: World War 2

Commanders
- First Commander: Sergei Yakovlevich Ogurtsov

10th Tank Division (Russian: 10-я танковая дивизия) was a Soviet tank division from the Second World War.

== History ==
Formed in July 1940 in the Kiev Military District as part of the 4th Mechanized Corps. The division itself was formed on the basis of the 5th Light Tank Brigade. In addition, the division received the 57th and 62nd Tank Battalions, the 222nd Reconnaissance Company, the 77th Communications Company, the 312th Motor Transport Company of the 10th Heavy Tank Brigade, and the 257th Rifle and 280th Light Artillery Regiments of the 7th and 146th Rifle Divisions, respectively.

As of June 22, 1941, it was stationed in the area of Zolochiv, Berezhany, and Zborov.

During Operation Barbarossa, it was part of the 15th Mechanized Corps. After losing almost all of its equipment during the retreat battles, the division was withdrawn to the rear and disbanded on 28 September 1941. On its basis, the 131st and 133rd Tank Brigades were formed.

== Commanders ==
- Major General Sergei Yakovlevich Ogurtsov
- Deputy Commander Nikolai Feofilovich Greznev
- Lieutenant Colonel Fyodor Vasilyevich Sukhoryuchkin Fyodor Vasilyevich Sukhoruchkin

== Organizational structure ==
- 19th Armored Regiment
- 20th Armored Regiment
- 10th Motorized Infantry Regiment
- 10th Howitzer Regiment
- 5th Light Tank Brigade
- 222nd Reconnaissance Company
- 57th Tank Battalion
- 62th Tank Battalion
- 312th Motor Transport Company
- 77th Communications Company
- 10th Heavy Tank Brigade
- 257th Rifle Regiment
- 280th Light Artillery Regiment
