= X Corps =

10th Corps, Tenth Corps, or X Corps may refer to:

== France ==
- 10th Army Corps (France)
- X Corps (Grande Armée), a unit of the Imperial French Army during the Napoleonic Wars

== Germany ==
=== German Empire ===
- X Corps (German Empire), Imperial German Army
- X Reserve Corps, Imperial German Army

=== Nazi Germany ===
- 10th Air Corps, Luftwaffe, Wehrmacht
- X Army Corps (Wehrmacht)
- X SS Corps, Waffen-SS

== Russia and Soviet Union ==
=== Russian Empire ===
- 10th Army Corps (Russian Empire)

=== Soviet Union ===
- 10th Assault Aviation Corps
- 10th Guards Budapest Rifle Corps
- 10th Guards Tank Corps
- 10th Mechanized Corps
- 10th Rifle Corps
- 10th Tank Corps

== United Kingdom ==
- X Corps (United Kingdom)

=== Artillery Volunteer Corps ===
- 10th (Lochgilphead) Argyllshire Artillery Volunteer Corps
- 10th (St Buryan) Cornwall Artillery Volunteer Corps
- 10th (Salcombe) Devonshire Artillery Volunteer Corps
- 10th (Wemyss) Fife Artillery Volunteer Corps
- 10th (Calton Artisans) Lanarkshire Artillery Volunteer Corps
- 10th (Birsay) Orkney Artillery Volunteer Corps

=== Rifle Volunteer Corps ===
- 10th (Wirksworth) Derbyshire Rifle Volunteer Corps
- 10th (Newton Abbot) Devonshire Rifle Volunteer Corps
- 10th (Cotswold Rifles) Gloucestershire Rifle Volunteer Corps
- 10th (Glasgow Highland) Lanarkshire Rifle Volunteer Corps
- 10th (Hinckley) Leicestershire Rifle Volunteer Corps
- 10th Middlesex Rifle Volunteer Corps
- 10th (Stoke-on-Trent) Staffordshire Rifle Volunteer Corps
- 10th (Bermondsey) Surrey Rifle Volunteer Corps
- 10th (Chichester) Sussex Rifle Volunteer Corps
- 10th (Finsbury) Tower Hamlets Rifle Volunteer Corps
- 10th (Hedon) Yorkshire (East Riding) Rifle Volunteer Corps

== United States ==
- X Corps (Union Army), American Civil War
- X Corps (United States)

== Other countries ==
- 10th Composite Aviation Corps, Bulgaria
- 10th Army Corps (Republic of China)
- X Corps (India)
- X Army Corps (Italy)
- X Corps (North Korea)
- X Corps (Ottoman Empire)
- X Corps (Pakistan)
- X Army Corps (Spain)
- 10th Army Corps (Ukraine)

== Other uses ==
- X-Corps, a Marvel Comics team founded by Banshee
- X-Corporation, the fictional Marvel Comics institution founded by Professor Charles Xavier
- X Corp., the owner and operator of Twitter

== See also ==
- List of military corps by number
- 10th Army (disambiguation)
- 10th Battalion (disambiguation)
- 10th Brigade (disambiguation)
- 10th Division (disambiguation)
- 10th Regiment (disambiguation)
- 10th Squadron (disambiguation)
- 10th (disambiguation)
- X (disambiguation)
