= Komissarovka, Vladimir Oblast =

Komissarovka Комиссаровка
- Settlement
- Location within Vladimir Oblast Location within Russia
- Coordinates: 55°42′N 40°37′E
- Country: Russia
- Region: Vladimir Oblast
- District: Gus-Khrustalny District
- Time zone: UTC+3:00

Komissarovka (Russian: Комиссаровка) is a rural locality (a settlement) in Posyolok Anopino, Gus-Khrustalny District, Vladimir Oblast, Russia. The population was 89 as of 2010.

== Geography ==
Komissarovka is located 25 km north of Gus-Khrustalny (the district's administrative centre) by road. Ivanovka is the nearest rural locality.
