= Novy Dvor, Novy Dvor selsoviet, Minsk district =

Agrotown in Minsk Region, Belarus

Novy Dvor Новы Двор (Belarusian) Новый Двор (Russian)
- Agrotown
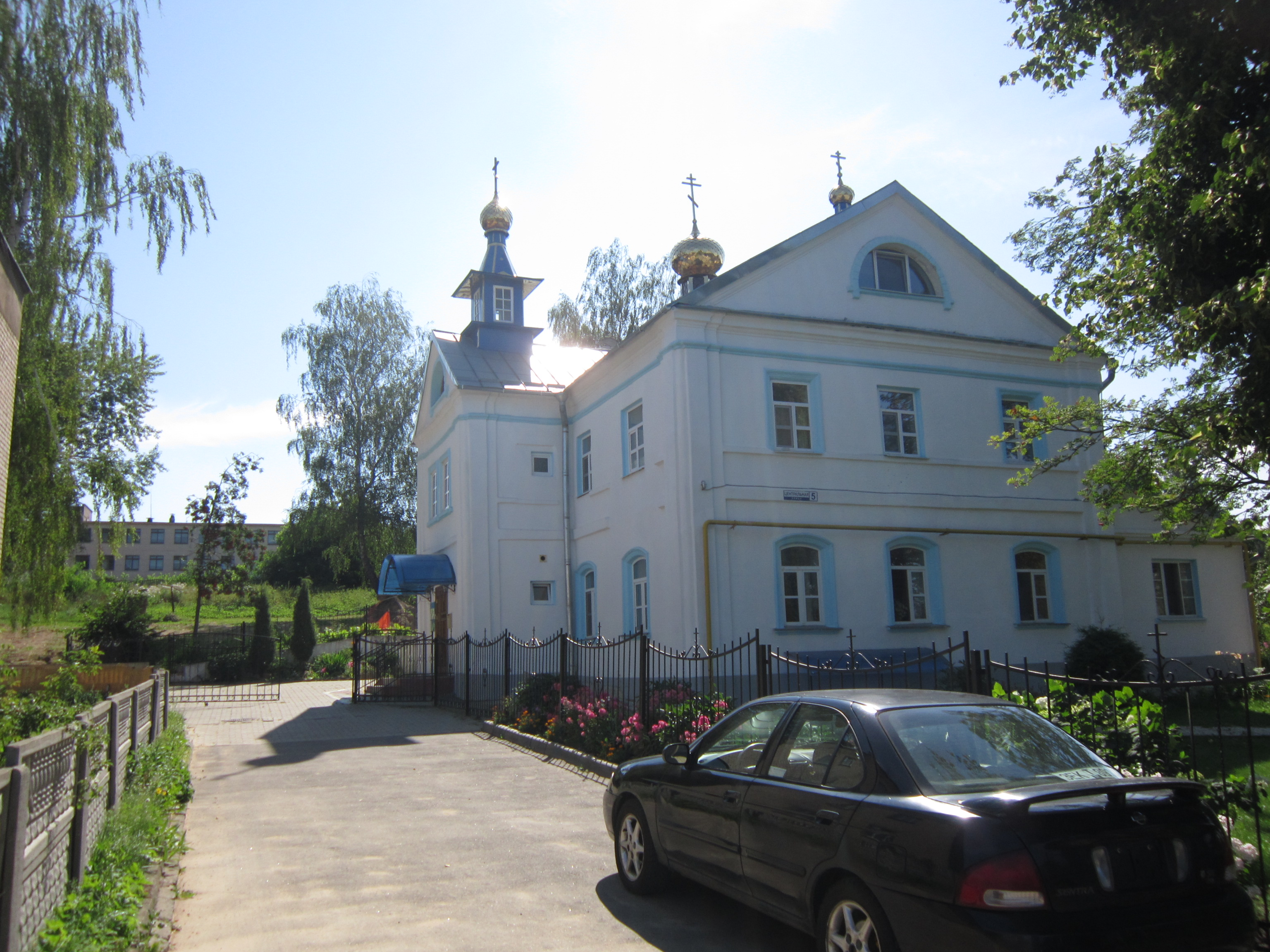

- Location within Belarus
- Coordinates: 53°48′55″N 27°39′24″E
- Country: Belarus
- Region: Minsk Region
- District: Minsk District

Population (2010)
  - Total: 1,128
- Time zone: UTC+3 (MSK)

Novy Dvor (Belarusian: Новы Двор; Russian: Новый Двор) is an agrotown in Minsk District, Minsk Region, Belarus. It serves as the administrative center of Novy Dvor rural council. It is located three kilometres (1.9 mi) from the Minsk Ring Road, southeast of the capital Minsk. In 1997, it had a population of 1,164. In 2010, it had a population of 1,128.
