= 10th Regiment =

10th Regiment may refer to:

- 10th Aviation Regiment, a unit of the United States Army
- 10th Field Regiment Royal Artillery
- 10th (R/Fus) Medium Regiment Royal Artillery 1942–1946, from 16th Battalion Royal Fusiliers (City of London Regt)
- 2/10th Armoured Regiment (Australia), a unit of the Australian Army
- 2nd/10th Medium Regiment, Royal Australian Artillery, a unit of the Australian Army
- 10th Light Horse Regiment (Australia), a unit of the Australian Army
- 10th Malay Regiment, an irregular formation which opposed the British occupation of Malaysia
- 10th (North Lincoln) Regiment of Foot, a unit of the British Army
- 10th Royal Hussars, a unit of the British Army
- 10th Royal Tank Regiment, a unit of the British Army
- 10th Regiment (Denmark), an infantry unit of the Danish Army 1951–1961
- 10th Infantry Regiment (United States), a unit of the United States Army
- 10th Cavalry Regiment (United States), a unit of the United States Army
- 10th Marine Regiment (United States), a unit of the United States Marine Corps
- 10th New-Ingermanland Infantry Regiment, a unit of the Russian Imperial Army

== American Revolutionary War regiments ==
- 10th Massachusetts Regiment
- 10th North Carolina Regiment
- 10th Pennsylvania Regiment
- 10th Virginia Regiment

== American Civil War regiments ==
Confederate (Southern) Army regiments

- 10th Regiment Alabama Infantry
- 10th Georgia Regiment
- 10th South Carolina Infantry Regiment

Union (Northern) Army regiments

- 10th Illinois Volunteer Infantry Regiment (3 Year)
- 10th Illinois Volunteer Infantry Regiment (3 Month)
- 10th Illinois Volunteer Cavalry Regiment
- 10th Iowa Volunteer Infantry Regiment
- 10th Maine Volunteer Infantry Regiment
- 10th Maryland Volunteer Infantry Regiment
- 10th Massachusetts Volunteer Infantry
- 10th Michigan Volunteer Infantry Regiment
- 10th Michigan Volunteer Cavalry Regiment
- 10th Minnesota Volunteer Infantry Regiment
- 10th New Hampshire Volunteer Regiment
- 10th Vermont Infantry Regiment
- 10th West Virginia Volunteer Infantry Regiment
- 10th Wisconsin Volunteer Infantry Regiment

== See also ==
- Tenth Army (disambiguation)
- X Corps (disambiguation)
- 10th Division (disambiguation)
- 10th Brigade (disambiguation)
- 10th Group (disambiguation)
- 10 Squadron (disambiguation)
