= 10th Reserve Division (People's Republic of China) =

- Active: 1955–1957
- Country: People's Republic of China
- Branch: People's Liberation Army
- Type: Division
- Role: Reserve Infantry
- Garrison/HQ: Guiyang, Guizhou

10th Reserve Division (Chinese: 预备第10师) was formed in winter 1955 in Yunnan province. In January 1956, the division moved to Guiyang, Guizhou. The division's codenumber was Military Unit 0507.

As of its activation the division was composed of:

- 28th Reserve Regiment - Maijiaqiao, Guiyang, Guizhou;
- 29th Reserve Regiment - Shisangongli, Guiyang, Guizhou;
- 30th Reserve Regiment - Zunyi, Guizhou;
- Artillery Regiment - Maijiaqiao, Guiyang, Guizhou;
- Anti-Aircraft Artillery Regiment - Zunyi, Guizhou;
- Sergeant Training Regiment - Shisangongli, Guiyang, Guizhou.

The division was fully manned and equipped. During its short-lived existence the division was focused on the training of reserve personnel in a bi-annual program. Before receiving recruits, the division was composed of 1066 officers, 1568 NCOs and 115 soldiers. The division started to receive new recruits since February 1956, after which the division reached 14,694 total personnel.

In April 1957 the division was disbanded before it even finished its first training program. The formal deactivation occurred in April 1958.
