= VT-4 (United States) =

Training Squadron 4
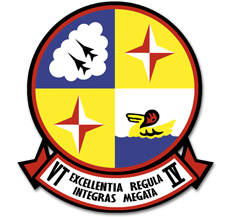
- VT-4 insignia
- Active: 1 May 1960 – December 2010; June 2013 – present
- Allegiance: United States
- Branch: United States Navy
- Type: Training
- Garrison/HQ: NAS Pensacola, Florida, U.S.
- Nickname(s): Warbucks

Aircraft flown
- Trainer: T-6A Texan II; T-1A Jayhawk; T-39 Sabreliner; T-34C Turbo Mentor; T-2 Buckeye; TA-4J Skyhawk; TF-9J Cougar

VT-4 or Training Squadron 4 is a training squadron of the United States Navy. Initially established as Basic Training Group 9 (BTG-9) in the 1950s, the squadron was redesignated as Training Squadron 4 (VT-4) on 1 May 1960 and based at Naval Air Station Pensacola, Florida.

== General information ==
- Advanced training for USN Naval Flight Officers (NFO) destined for E-2 Hawkeye, E-6 Mercury, EP-3 Aries, and P-8 Poseidon aircraft.
- The squadron's radio callsign is Buck.

== History ==
Its original mission was providing flight instruction for US Navy and US Marine Corps Student Naval Aviators in the basic jet training syllabus utilizing the T-2A version of the T-2 Buckeye aircraft.

In 1965, Training Squadron FOUR transitioned to the T-2B aircraft and its mission was modified to become the Naval Air Training Command's sole site for providing student pilots with basic jet flight instruction in aerial gunnery and carrier qualification. In 1971, Training Squadron FOUR transitioned to the T-2C aircraft. The squadron mission was changed once again, to provide flight training in all phases of the basic jet syllabus.

In September 1972, Training Squadron FOUR acquired the TF-9J providing flight instruction in both basic and advanced jet training. This mission was unique in the Naval Air Training Command in that student pilots experienced their first flight in a jet aircraft in VT-4 and remained aboard to be subsequently designated Naval Aviators.

November 1973 saw the introduction of the TA-4J to replace the aging TF-9J for advanced flight training.

Beginning in December 1975, VT-4 had the added mission of providing flight instruction for allied foreign military pilots. Flight training has been given to student pilots from Kuwait, Spain, Singapore and Indonesia.

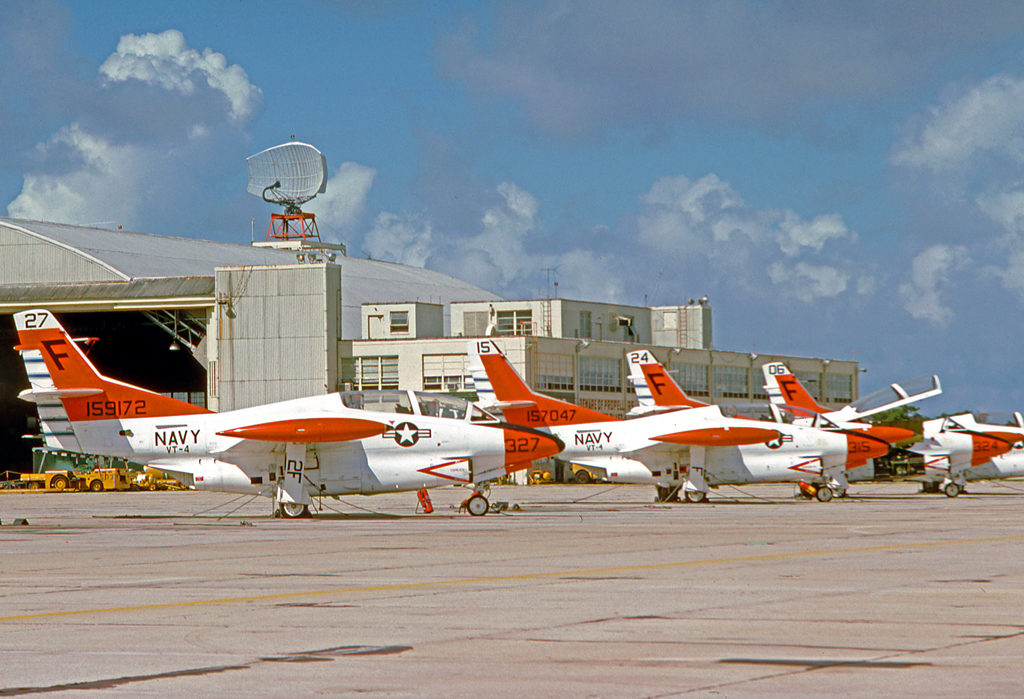
North American T-2C Buckeyes of VT-4 Training Squadron at Pensacola NAS Florida in July 1975

In addition to pilot training, VT-4 has had two other significant missions. From 1973 to 1978, VT-4 provided summer jet orientation flights for midshipmen of the United States Naval Academy and the Naval Reserve Officers Training Corps. From 1975 to 1979, VT-4 was also responsible for the training of Naval Flight Surgeons.

In December 1985, VT-4's mission was changed from strike training to the sole site of E-2/C-2 intermediate training in CNATRA. In this role, the squadron carrier qualified Student Naval Aviators from the multiengine training pipeline, informally called the "prop pipeline," who we selected to eventually fly the E-2 Hawkeye and C-2 Greyhound aircraft in the Fleet. Graduates of VT-4 would receive their wings and designations as Naval Aviators and proceed to the Fleet Replacement Squadron.

In January 1992, VT-4's mission became the E-2/C-2 advanced training site. To accomplish this mission VT-4 flew the T-2C.

During 1996, VT-4 underwent significant change. From a small all Navy Advanced E-2/C-2 pilot training squadron with a student throughput of 36 per year, it became a joint Primary and Intermediate Naval Flight Officer/Navigator training squadron with an annual student throughput of 450. Instructor ranks grew from fourteen Navy pilots to 71 Navy, Marine Corps and Air Force pilots and NFO/Navigators. The squadron transitioned from flying the T-2C to flying the T-34C Turbo Mentor and T-1A Jayhawk. VT-4 also instructs student navigators from Germany, Italy, Saudi Arabia, Norway and Denmark. From April to September 1996 the squadron had primary NFO/NAV and advanced pilot training being conducted simultaneously. Following the final CQ detachment in September, the mission converted entirely to NFO/NAV training. On 30 September 1996, the last VT-4 Naval Aviators earned their wings.

In January 2003, VT-4 initiated instructor orientation flights in the T-6A "Texan II", the joint Air Force/Navy platform slated to replace the T-34C as the Primary phase syllabus trainer. The T-6A "Texan II" is a single engine, two-seat trainer which is fully aerobatic. It features a pressurized cockpit, a G-tolerance enhancement system and dual zero-zero ejection seats. The T-6A utilizes a state-of-the-art digital cockpit to help familiarize students with what they will encounter in their fleet tours.

In August 2003, VT-4 marked its first training flight in the T-6A "Texan II".

In April 2005, VT-4 completed the transition to the T-6A "Texan II" and flew its last T-34C "Turbomentor" student sortie.

In December 2010, VT-4 was deactivated and all VT-4 instructors and students became a part of VT-10. VT-4 was reactivated in June 2013, no longer flying the T-39 Sabreliner and has introduced the Multicrew Simulator (MCS) to TRAWING SIX. VT-4 is the winging squadron for all NFOs destined for the E-2 Hawkeye, E-6 Mercury, EP-3 Aries, P-3 Orion and P-8 Poseidon, relieving the respective Fleet Replacement Squadrons (FRS) for those type/model/series (T/M/S) aircraft of that responsibility.

Since its establishment, VT-4 has amassed over 600,000 flight hours. The squadron has logged 42,000 carrier landings.

== See also ==
- History of the United States Navy
- List of United States Navy aircraft squadrons
- List of Inactive United States Navy aircraft squadrons
