= 10th Brigade =

10th Brigade may refer to:

== Australia ==
- 10th Brigade (Australia)

== Canada ==
- 10th Canadian Infantry Brigade

== China ==
- 10th Armored Brigade (People's Republic of China)

== Greece ==
- 10th Mechanized Infantry Brigade

== Hungary ==
- 10th Infantry Brigade (Hungary)

== India ==
- 10th Indian Brigade
- 10th Cavalry Brigade (British Indian Army), of the British Indian Army in the First World War, distinct from the one below
- 10th Indian Cavalry Brigade, of the British Indian Army in the First World War, distinct from the one above
- 10th Indian Infantry Brigade, infantry brigade of the Indian Army during World War II
- 10th Indian Motor Brigade, brigade of the Indian Army during World War II

== Israel ==
- Harel Brigade

== Lebanon ==
- 10th Infantry Brigade (Lebanon)

== Malaysia ==
- 10th Parachute Brigade

== New Zealand ==
- 10th Infantry Brigade (New Zealand)

== Poland ==
- 10th Armoured Cavalry Brigade (Poland)
- 10th Motorized Cavalry Brigade (Poland)

== Romania ==
- 10th Engineer Brigade

== Russia/Soviet Union ==
- 10th Spetsnaz Brigade

== South Africa ==
- 10 Artillery Brigade (South Africa)

== Ukraine ==
- 10th Mountain Assault Brigade
- 10th Naval Aviation Brigade

== United Kingdom ==
- 10th Armoured Brigade (United Kingdom)
- 10th Cyclist Brigade
- 10th Infantry Brigade (United Kingdom)
- 10th Mounted Brigade
- 10th Provisional Brigade
- 10th Reserve Brigade
- 10th Tank Brigade (United Kingdom)

=== Artillery units ===
- 10th Brigade Royal Field Artillery
- 10th (Bedford) Army Brigade, Royal Field Artillery
- X Brigade, Royal Horse Artillery

== United States ==
- 10th Air Transport Brigade
- 10th Sustainment Brigade

== See also ==
- 10th Division (disambiguation)
- 10th Regiment (disambiguation)
