= One Ten =

One Ten may refer to:

- 110 (number)
- 110 BC
- AD 110
- Packard One-Ten, also known as One Ten, a model of automobile

== See also ==
- 110 (disambiguation)
