= Gareus =

Gareus is a Mesopotamian deity who was introduced to Uruk (in modern-day Iraq) by the Parthians, who built a temple attributed to him there around 110 AD. Nothing is known so far of this deity outside of what has been found from the scattered remnants around that temple, which suggest that Gareus combined elements from both Hellenistic and Babylonian religious traditions.

== See also ==
- Temple of Gareus
- List of Mesopotamian deities
