= 110 =

110 may refer to:

- 110 (number), the natural number following 109 and preceding 111
- AD 110, a year
- 110 BC, a year
- 110 film, a cartridge-based film format used in still photography
- Route 110 (MBTA), a bus route in Massachusetts, US
- 110 (song), 2019 song by Capital Bra and Samra from the album Berlin lebt 2
- 110 Lydia, a main-belt asteroid
- 1-1-0, an emergency telephone number used to reach police services in Iran, Germany, Estonia, China, Indonesia, Japan, Norway, and Turkey.
- Lenovo IdeaPad 110, a discontinued brand of notebook computers
- International 110, an American keelboat design, usually just called the 110
- Kei Lun stop (MTR digital station code 110), a Light Rail stop in Tuen Mun, Hong Kong
- Škoda 110, a small family sedan
- Lada 110, a compact car

== See also ==
- 1/10 (disambiguation)
- Darmstadtium, synthetic chemical element with atomic number 110
