= Parthian art =

Art during the Parthian Empire

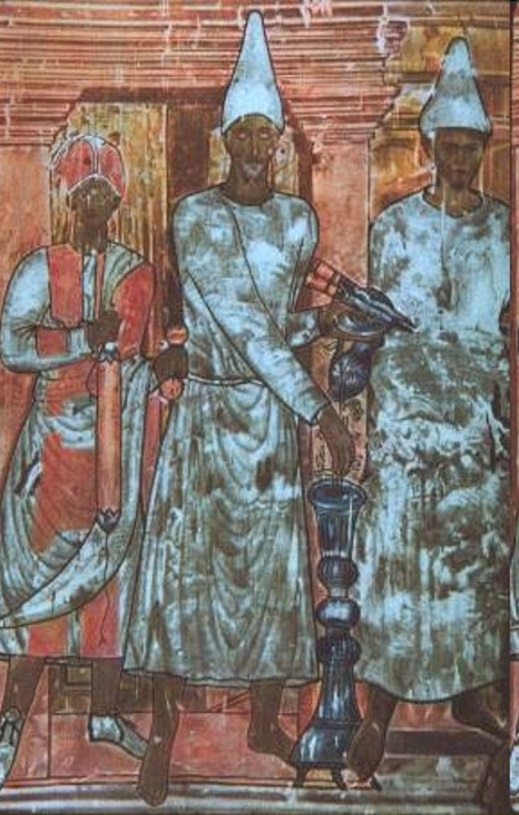
Parthian artwork found in Dura-Europos. According to the principle of "Parthian frontality", all figures, human or divine, face directly forward, with eyes fixed on the spectator.

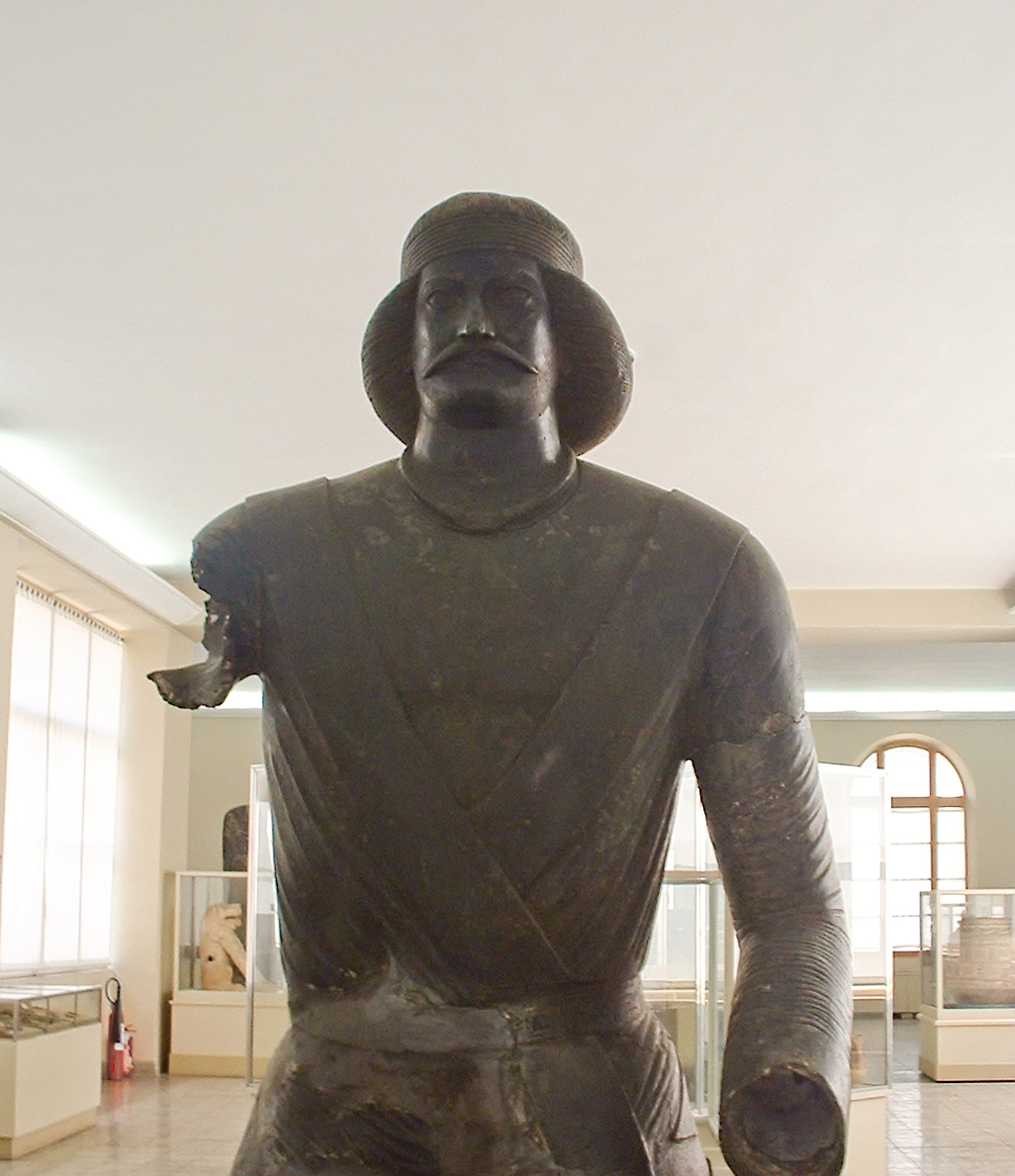
A bronze statue of a Parthian nobleman from the sanctuary at Shami in Elymais

Parthian art was Iranian art made during the Parthian Empire from 247 BC to 224 AD, based in the Near East. It has a mixture of Persian and Hellenistic influences. For some time after the period of the Parthian Empire, art in its styles continued for some time. A typical feature of Parthian art is the frontality of the people shown. Even in narrative representations, the actors do not look at the object of their action, but at the viewer. These are features that anticipate the art of medieval Europe and Byzantium.

Parthian sites are often overlooked in excavations, thus the state of research knowledge in Parthian art is not complete. The excavations at Dura-Europos in the 20th century provided many new discoveries. The classical archaeologist and director of the excavations, Michael Rostovtzeff, realized that the art of the first centuries AD from Palmyra, Dura Europos, and also in Iran as far as the Greco-Buddhist art of north India followed the same principles. He called this art style Parthian art.

It is doubtful that the characteristics of "Parthian art" have anything to do with Parthia itself; the most characteristic feature of the "Parthian" art is frontality which is not a special feature of Iranian or Parthian art and first appeared in the art of Palmyra. There are doubts whether this art can be called a "Parthian" art or that it should be associated with any particular regional area; there is no evidence that this art was created outside the middle-Euphrates region then brought to Palmyra for example. This art is better thought of as a local development common to the middle Euphrates region.

== General ==
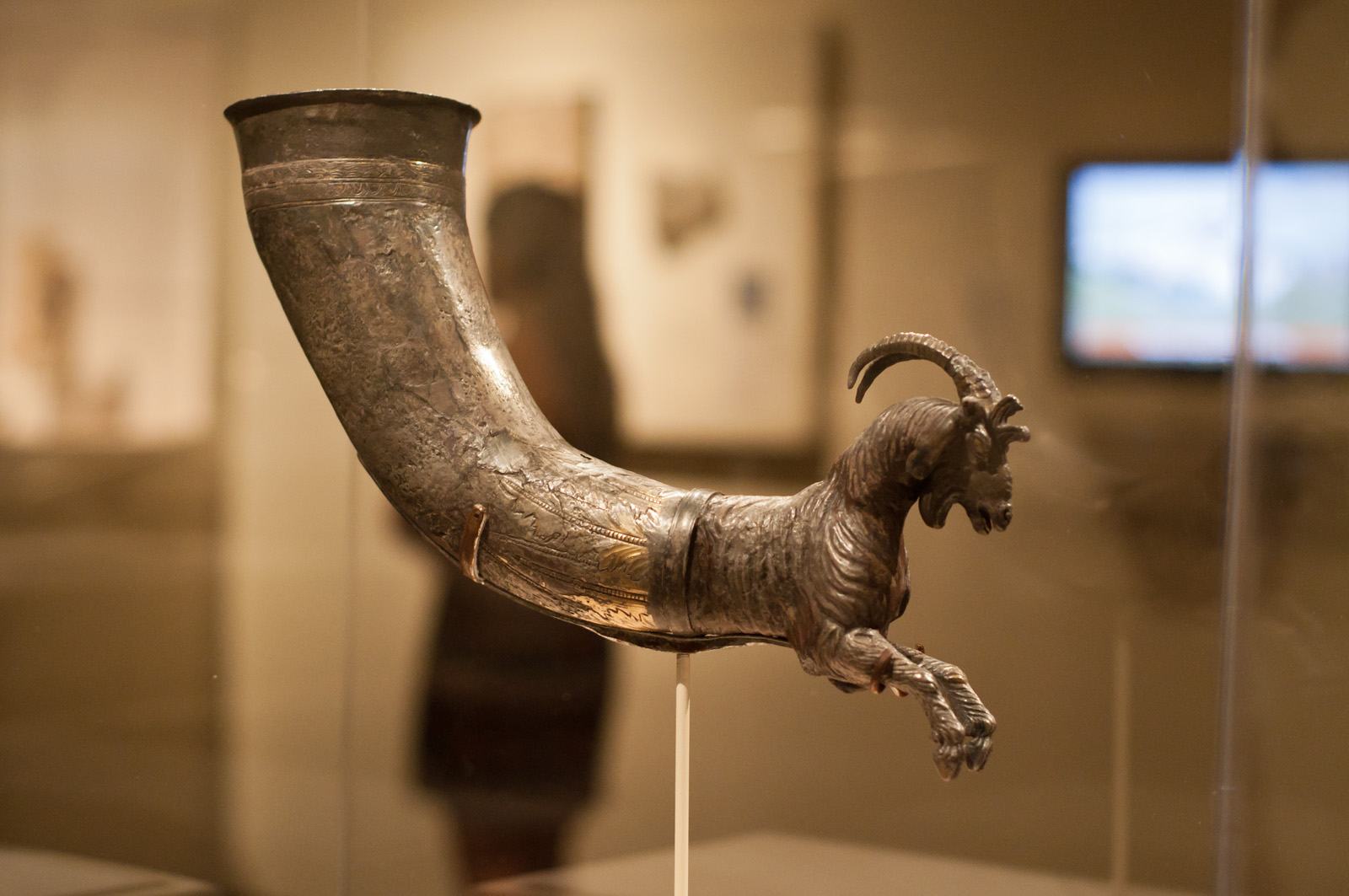
A rhyton drinking vessel with animal details; such vessels were widely produced in Persia during the Achaemenid Empire (550–330 BC), though the lifelike animal details as seen in this one date from the later Parthian Empire (247 BC – AD 224).

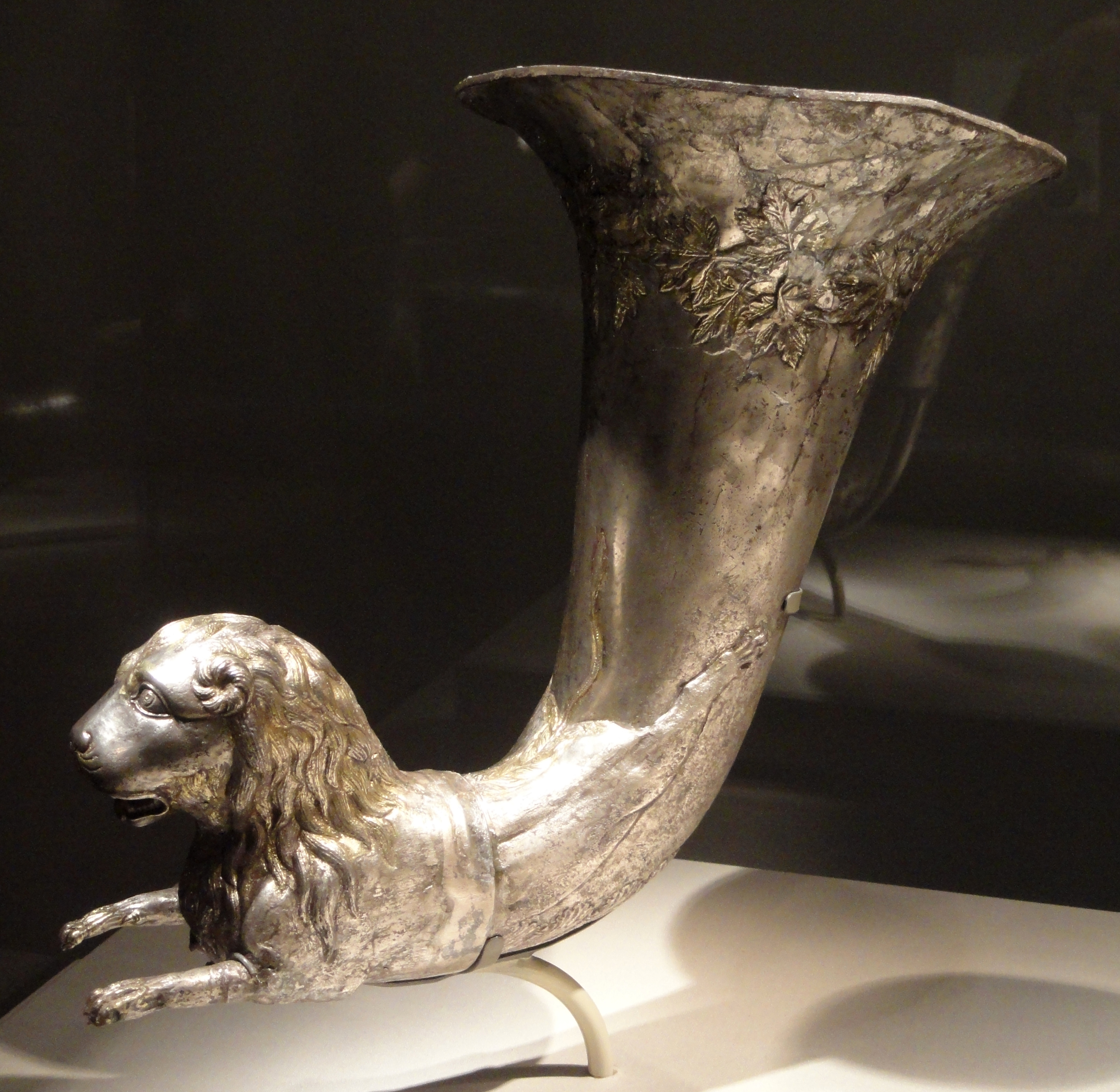
A rhyton wine horn with lion protome, Iran, Parthian period, 1st century BC - 1st century AD, silver and gilt, housed in the Arthur M. Sackler Gallery

What is now described as Parthian art since the end of the 19th century, was not known as such a century ago. Palmyra since that time has had numerous sculptures sent to Europe. They depict men and women in robes, richly decorated with numerous jewels, and often represent the ruins of a city often associated with romantic literary sources in conjunction with Queen Zenobia. However, no separate term was found here for the art created, but they were considered a local variant of Roman art. The excavations at Dura-Europos since inception and especially since the early decades of the 20th century have provided many new discoveries. The classical archaeologist and director of the excavations, Michael Rostovtzeff, realized that the art of the first centuries AD in Palmyra, Dura Europos, and also in Iran and its other territories followed the same principles. He labeled this art work as Parthian art. The widespread use of this art, even beyond the limits of Parthian empire, however, raised the question of whether this art was truly suitable to label Parthian, which is according to Schlumberger usually affirmed in research, as it was probably influenced by the art of the Parthian capital of Ctesiphon. Nevertheless, the designation of artistic creation of the Parthian Empire and the affected areas in which the research is inconsistent and scrutinized. Authors often avoid the term Parthian art, preferring instead to name the art work on the cultural and political space. Daniel Schlumberger affirmed the notion of Parthian art in one of his most important works about the Hellenized Orient (in the original: L'Orient Hellénisé, appeared in Germany in the World of Art series). However, the book covers not only Parthian art, but also Greek art in the Orient in general. Hans Erik Mathiesen titled his work the Parthian sculpture: Sculpture in the Parthian Empire in which he studies art from cities such as Palmyra. Likewise, Trudy S. Kawami called her work to Statues in Iran: Monumental Art of the Parthian period of Iran, while Malcolm Colledge wrote his book Parthian art clearly as Parthian art to strictly define a designation of Parthian art.

The Parthian empire stretched over a vast area that was congruent mainly with the territory of present-day Iran and Iraq, and many different tribes. It lasted for over 400 years. From these conditions, it is clear that strong regional differences in the art are expected and that there was a significant development over the centuries. Although there are numerous examples of Parthian art, including those of the royal court, that are well-preserved, there are holes in the examples through the centuries. Much of the evidence comes from outside of Parthia, such as coins of Gondophares, from about 50 AD found in India in Parthian style.

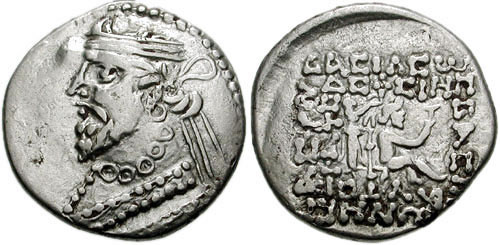
Coin of Gondophares, found in India in clear Parthian style

Parthian art is also present in Syria, in many cities such as Palmyra, Edessa and Dura Europos. Not all of the specimens belonged specifically to the Parthians. In the north, this art seems to have flourished in Armenia, although little remains. In the south, Bahrain clearly followed the Parthian art form, while in the east the transition to Gandhara art is gradual and therefore difficult to draw a clear line. In earlier research, which looked at the Greek art of Classical Greece as an ideal, Parthian art was often dismissed as decadent and barbaric art. Recent research, however, sees this differentiated. Parthian art had many creative and original methods and works, and was an influential form especially for Byzantine art and Medieval art.

The strong frontal orientation of Parthian art is unusual for the Middle East and new seems to be influenced by the presence of Greek art, which passed through the Orient since the 3rd century BC. Parthian art can therefore be described as an oriental creation of the experience of Hellenistic art.

== Epochs ==
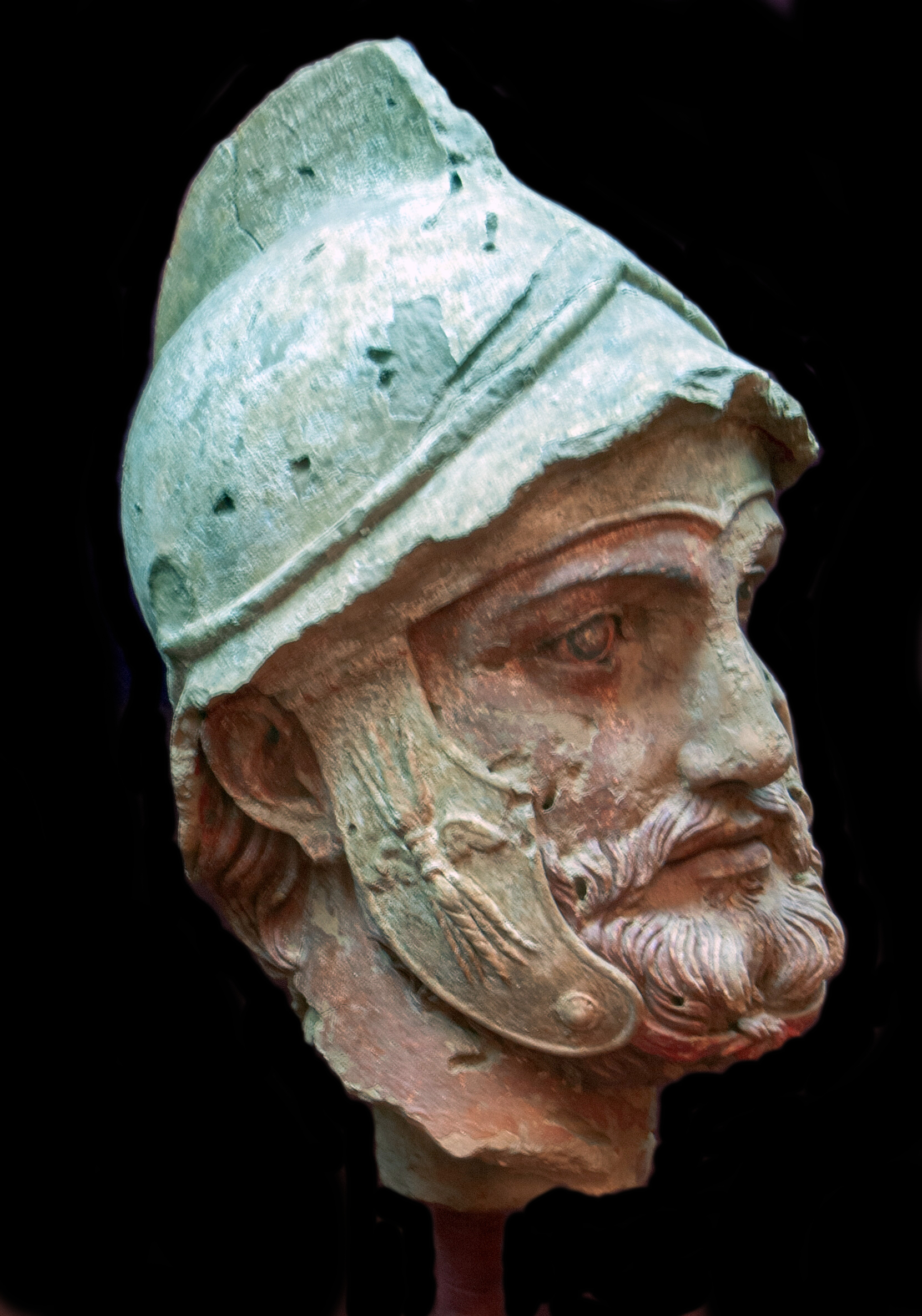
The Nisa helmeted warrior, a Hellenistic figure or deity, from the Parthian royal residence and necropolis of Nisa, Turkmenistan, 2nd century BC

The art of Parthia can be roughly divided into two style epochs: A Greek-style phase and a truly Parthian phase. These styles are not necessarily chronological phases following each other, but it can be viewed with strong chronological overlap. A Greek influenced city Seleucia on the Tigris was creating art in the Greek style much longer than the Eastern cities, such as Ecbatana. An example are the coins of Vonones I (6-12 AD), the specimens that were minted in Seleucia show a purely Greek style. The coins of the same ruler from Ecbatana show a style that is heavily distinguished away from Greek models.

=== Hellenistic phase ===
At the beginning of their history, Parthian art was still very much influenced and likened to Greek art. Especially in the earliest Parthian capital of Nisa evidence could be discovered from the early Parthian period indicating the similarities to Greek culture. Most finds there date to the first three centuries BC. There were purely Greek marble sculptures and a series of ivory rhytons in Hellenistic style with figuratively decorated designs.

The marble statues are on average 50 to 60 cm high. One of which is a similar depiction of winged Aphrodite. The lower part of the figure is made of dark stone, so that the marble body comes to a better focus. Another female figure wearing a chiton and an overlying peplos, the right shoulder is a shawl. Both statues were likely imported over, either in Hellenic conquests and colonization, or through trade. They are painted with the favorite Hellenistic colors of the then ruling kings there.

The ornamental bands of rhytons depict scenes from Greek mythology. The style of the figures is purely Hellenistic, even if the characters are a bit rough and some topics from the Greek stories shown were apparently not always understood. Nisa and the province of Parthia, which holds the origins of the Parthian Empire, is adjacent to Greek Bactria and is therefore presumed to have influenced the early Parthian artistic or that the Rhytha were made in Bactria and came to Nisa as loot.

The architecture has major Greek influences, while some Iranian elements from the beginning are observable. The architectural decorations in Nisa are usually purely Greek. There were Ionic and Corinthian capitals with acanthus leaves. Nisa's battlements and fortifications, however, have their origin in a more Iranian fashion. The square house in Nisa is 38×38 meters in size and consists of a large courtyard which is decorated on all four sides by columns. Behind it are found on all four sides elongated rooms, on whose walls are benches. The building perhaps served as a royal treasury and was built of unbaked bricks. The builders were likely following contemporary fashions, recalling the construction of a Greek palaestrae. Overall, Nisa appears as a colonial, Hellenistic Royal Court, which hardly differs from other contemporary Hellenistic residences. This is also evident to observe in Ai-Khanoum where a royal residence of the Greek-Bactrian kingdom was excavated. Schlumberger desires that these examples, therefore, not be classified as Parthian.

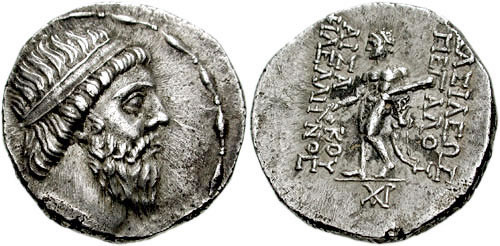
Coin of Mithridates I

Without inscriptions and precise excavations of early Seleucid findings, Parthian buildings are often hard to distinguish. In Khurab in Iran today is a large mansion with Ionic and Doric columns. The proportions of individual components (pillars seem to be long and thin) suggest that this house had no purely Greek architect. The exact date is therefore controversial.

This Hellenistic style of the early Parthian period was also used on the coins of the Parthian rulers. The earliest specimens are difficult to determine, but are certainly in the Greek style, even if the Parthian rulers carry attributes, which gives the coin an amalgamated appearance. Under Mithridates I, who conquered large parts of the Hellenistic Seleucid Empire, the coins are barely distinguishable from those in the style of Hellenistic royal courts. It is also significant to note that the Parthians could mint only silver and copper coins, but no gold coins. The few known gold coins appear to have been influenced by local princes and prestigious properties in the Parthian sphere of influence.

=== Parthian phase ===
The Greek style that may have continued to live on in the production of art in many places in the Parthian pre-Hellenistic traditions. In Assyria there were two pillars, which are held in such a Hellenic style. They each show a man standing in Parthian costume, however. The figure and the head are shown in profile and are thus in a Mesopotamian tradition. A third stele shows a similar figure, now, however, with his face to the front. In the Parthian Empire various dating systems were in use at the same time and it is not known which of these stelae are dated to the correct era.

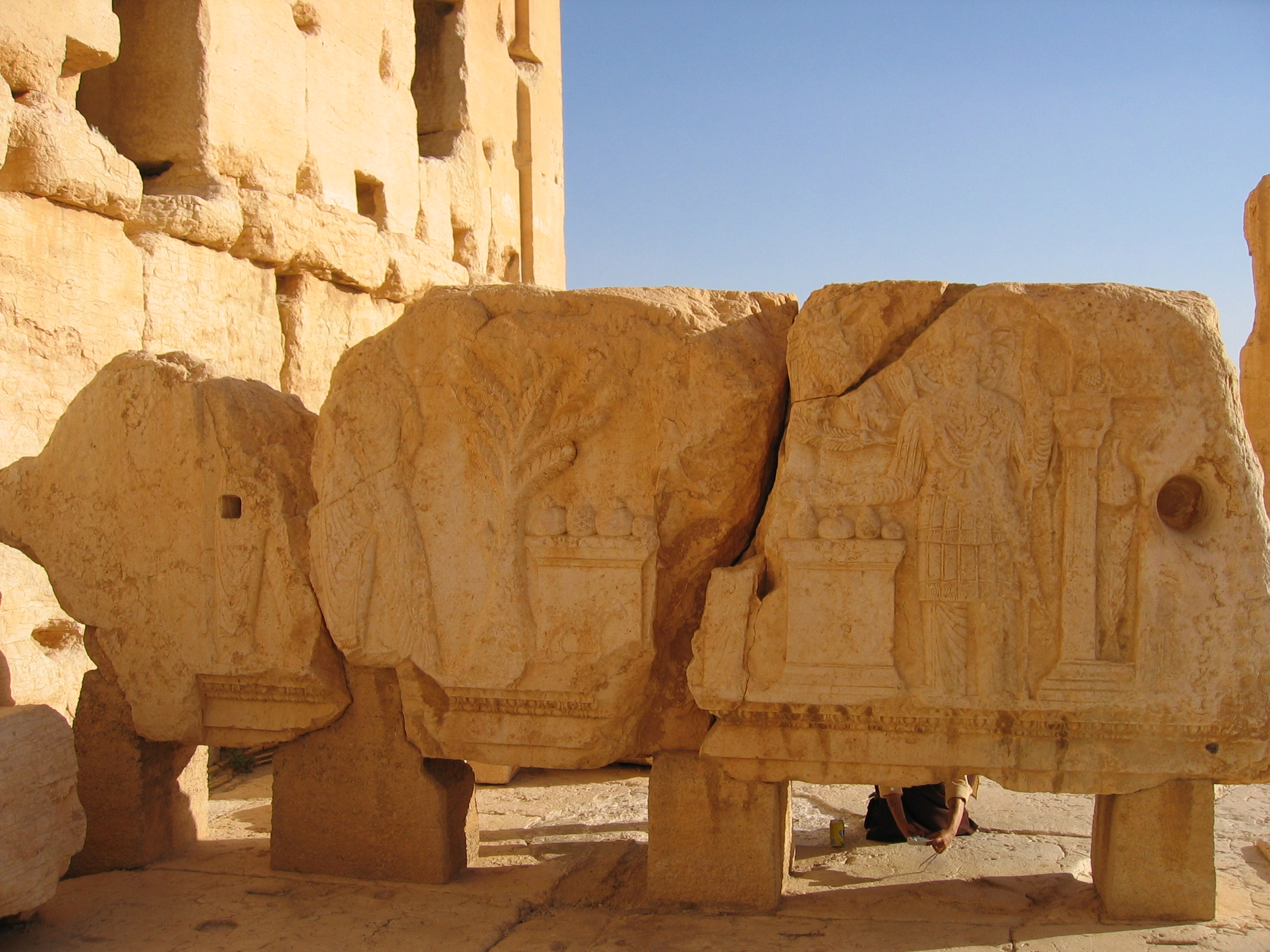
Relief on the Baal-Temple in Palmyra

In the year 31 AD, a stele dating from Dura-Europos, which shows the god Zeus Kyrios consecrating Seleucus I Nicator was erected. The head and the chest of Zeus Kyrios are shown frontally, but the legs come from the side. The Temple of Bel Palmyra Baureliefs, which can safely be dated to the 1st century AD was founded on 6 April 32 AD, in a new style. The reliefs probably show myths, but their content is unknown from written sources, so that the representations can only be interpreted visually and thus remain incomprehensible. The figures are shown frontally, even in narrative representations of the characters as they turn to the viewer of the reliefs and not the other characters and figures in the scenes. The origin of frontality that characterized Palmyrene and Parthian arts is a controversial issue; while Parthian origin has been suggested (by Daniel Schlumberger), Michael Avi-Yonah contends that it was a local Syrian tradition that influenced Parthian art.

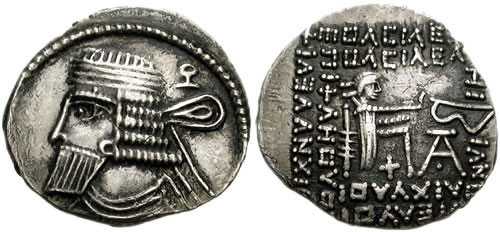
Coin of Vologases I

Therefore, it can be determined from around the 1st century in the Parthian Empire a new style, which is characterized mainly by severe frontal views of the figures, by a linearism and a hieratic representation, is observed. This style veers away from earlier Greek models, includes but not directly to the pre-Hellenistic art, even though the hieratic and the linearism can also be found in the Art of the ancient Near East. This style seems to have originated in Mesopotamia, in particular Babylon.

The best example of the emergence of a new style is in the contemporary coinage. The images of the Parthian kings are often highly stylized in the 1st century. Angular shapes replaced the round, flowing forms of the Greek style, at least more prevalently, on the profile on the coins. From about 50 BC on, Parthia saw frequent clashes with the Greco-oriented Rome. The new style is therefore perhaps a deliberate departure from the Hellenistic traditions and a return to their own traditions and values.

== Paintings ==
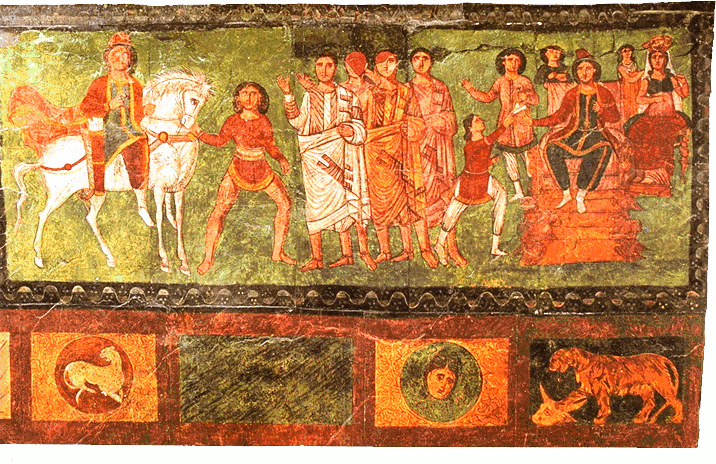
Wall paintings from Dura-Europos

Particularly pronounced in detail in Parthian art is the painted murals. Numerous examples are available in Dura Europos. Some examples are from Palmyra and Hatra and fragments of wall paintings have been found in Ashur and Babylon. Many of the murals come from temples and houses of worship. In the synagogue and the church of Dura Europos there are mainly scenes from the Bible. In Mitraeum there are scenes of the deity Mithras. In some temples of the city there are figures of donors and their family members prominently depicted. Residential buildings were much less likely to be painted in the Parthian world than in the Greco-Roman word. Here banquet and hunting scenes illustrate the life of the nobility and ruling class.

The figures are all shown facing frontally. While facing the frontal view in Hellenistic painting was one of many possibilities, it was now the general fashion in Parthian art. The figures are facing the viewer, and even in narrative representations one has the feeling that individual characters no longer interact with each other, but are only directed at the viewer. The perspective that it was in Greek style, has largely been disasserted. A certain space of the figures is only indicated by shading on individual parts of the body. The base line, which had played a significant role in Near Eastern art, began to have no meaning. The figures now seem often to float freely in space. At least the majority of the paintings at Dura Europos were commissioned by private donors. They would have been represented on the temple walls with their family, with their names written next to the characters.

However, there are virtually no examples of figurative wall paintings from the early stages of Parthian art, as it was still under Greek influence. The beginning of Parthian style painting remains unknown for now. In Dura Europos the best purely Parthian examples were dated to the 1st century AD on temple walls. One scene shows the offerings of Conon. It is among the earliest known Parthian paintings, and is one of the highest quality examples of Parthian art. It shows already all their stylistic features. Although the individual figures are arranged in a foreshortened architecture, with a few of them on the ground, most seem to float in space. All the figures are shown frontally.

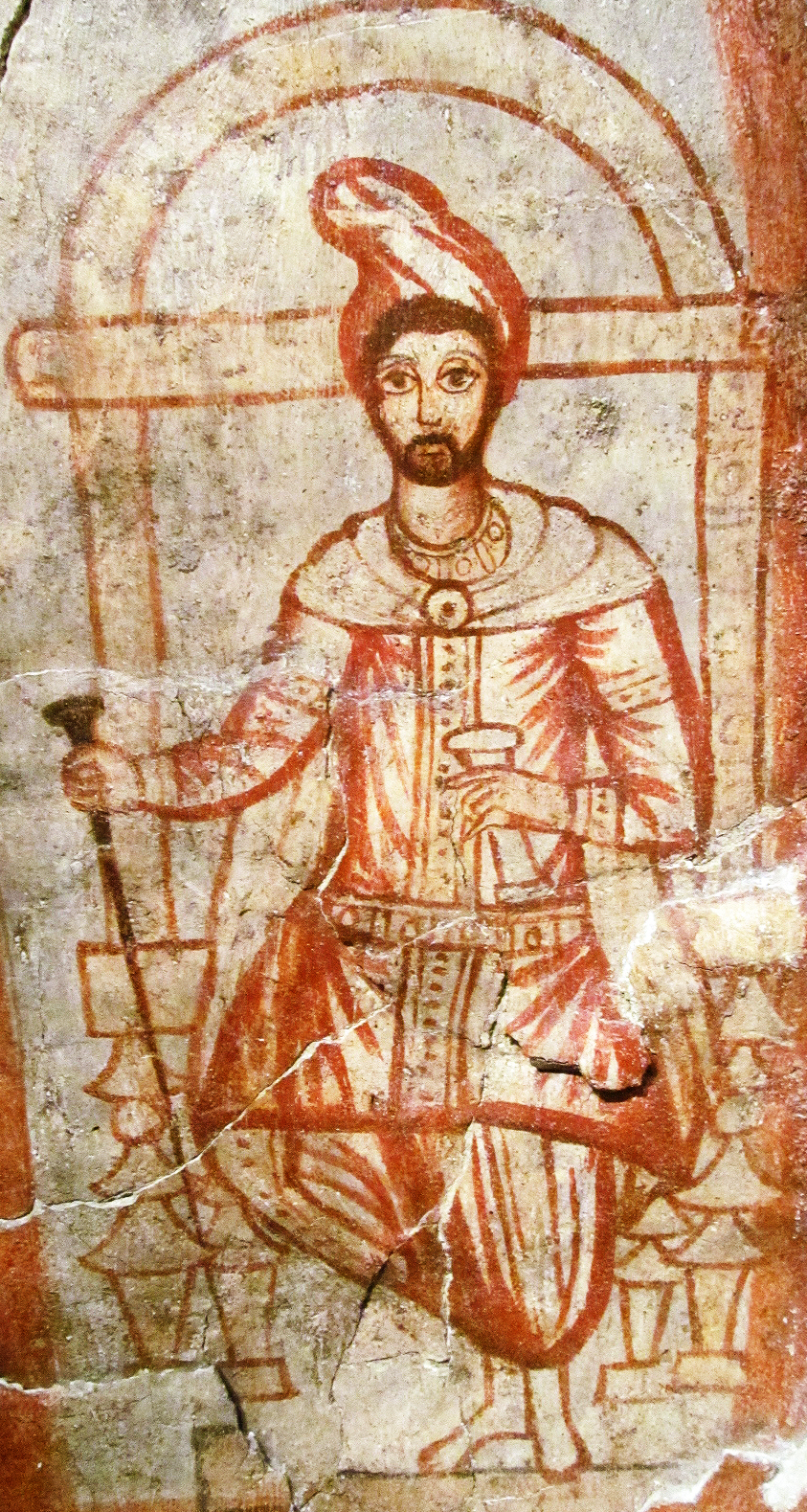
Palmyrene pater of the Roman cult of Mithras at Dura-Europos (Syria), 3rd century B

Around the year 244 AD, the synagogue of Dura Europos, which was mostly painted with scenes from the Old Testament was completed. Individual scenes can be found in small panels reproduced, in turn, lining up the entire wall. The figures are a bit stockier than at other temples to Parthian gods, but show essentially the same style characteristics. They are represented usually frontally and often seem to float in space.

The well-preserved examples of Parthian paintings are mostly from temples and houses of worship. Secular paintings are not as well preserved, and are therefore less known and documented. A specialty among these seems to have been battle and hunting scenes that glorified the lifestyle of the ruling class. Especially prevalent was the motive of the rider. The horses are reproduced here in full gallop. The riders themselves are depicted sitting on them facing the viewer. In battle scenes, there usually are heavily armed cataphracts; in hunting scenes there are more simply equipped archers. Remnants of such a riding scene were found in the palace of Assur and seem to have decorated the main rooms of the building. Other examples were found in the Mithraeum of Dura Europos. Such riding scenes, in a slightly modified form, would become particularly popular with the Sasanians.

=== Examples of wall paintings from Dura-Europos ===
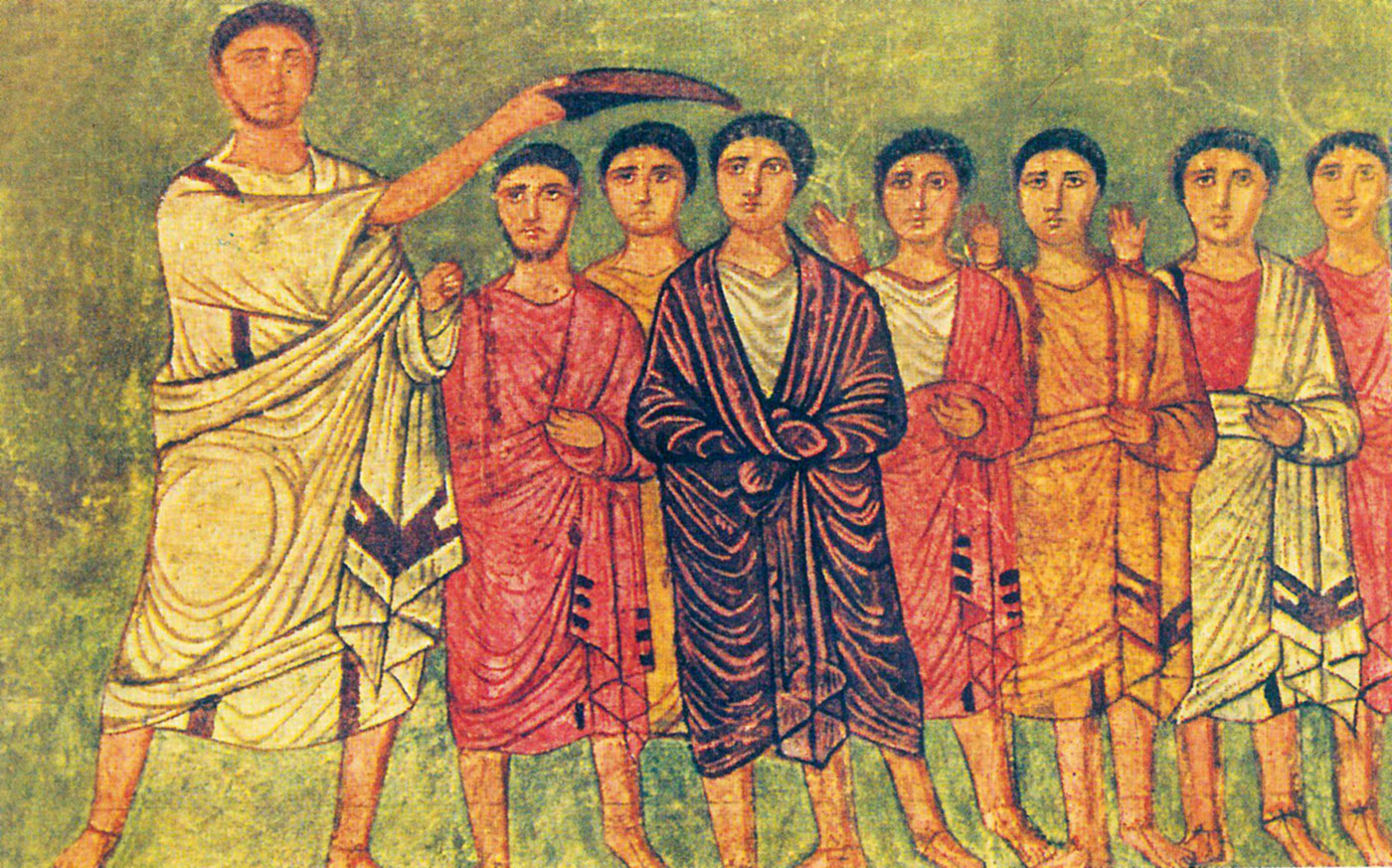
Synagogue of Dura-Europos: Samuel anoints King David

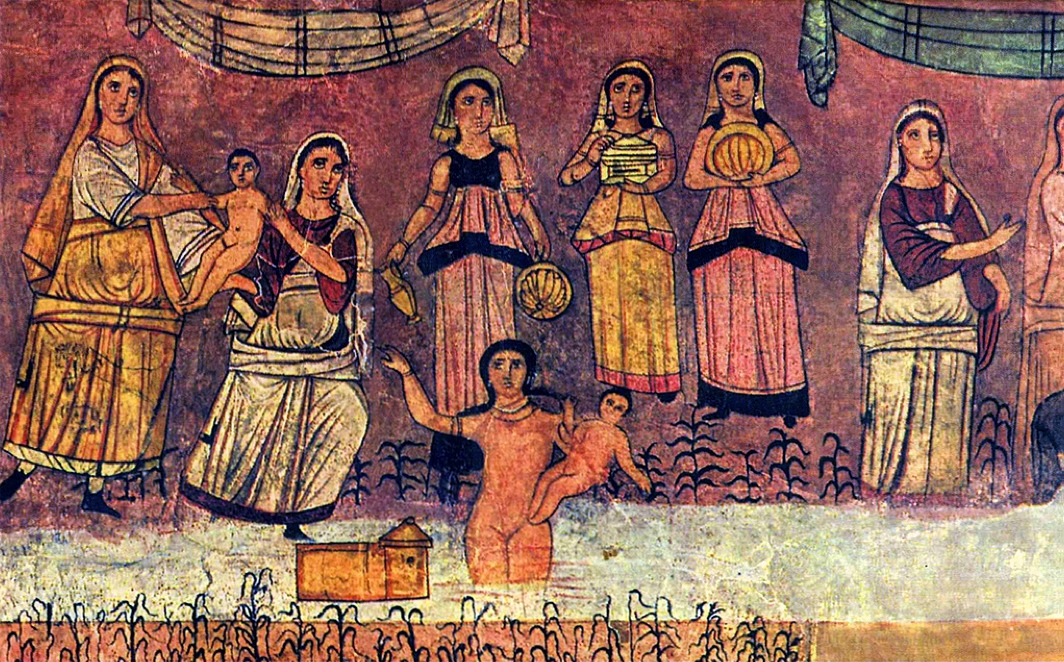
Synagogue of Dura-Europos: Moses is saved from the Nile

== Sculptures ==
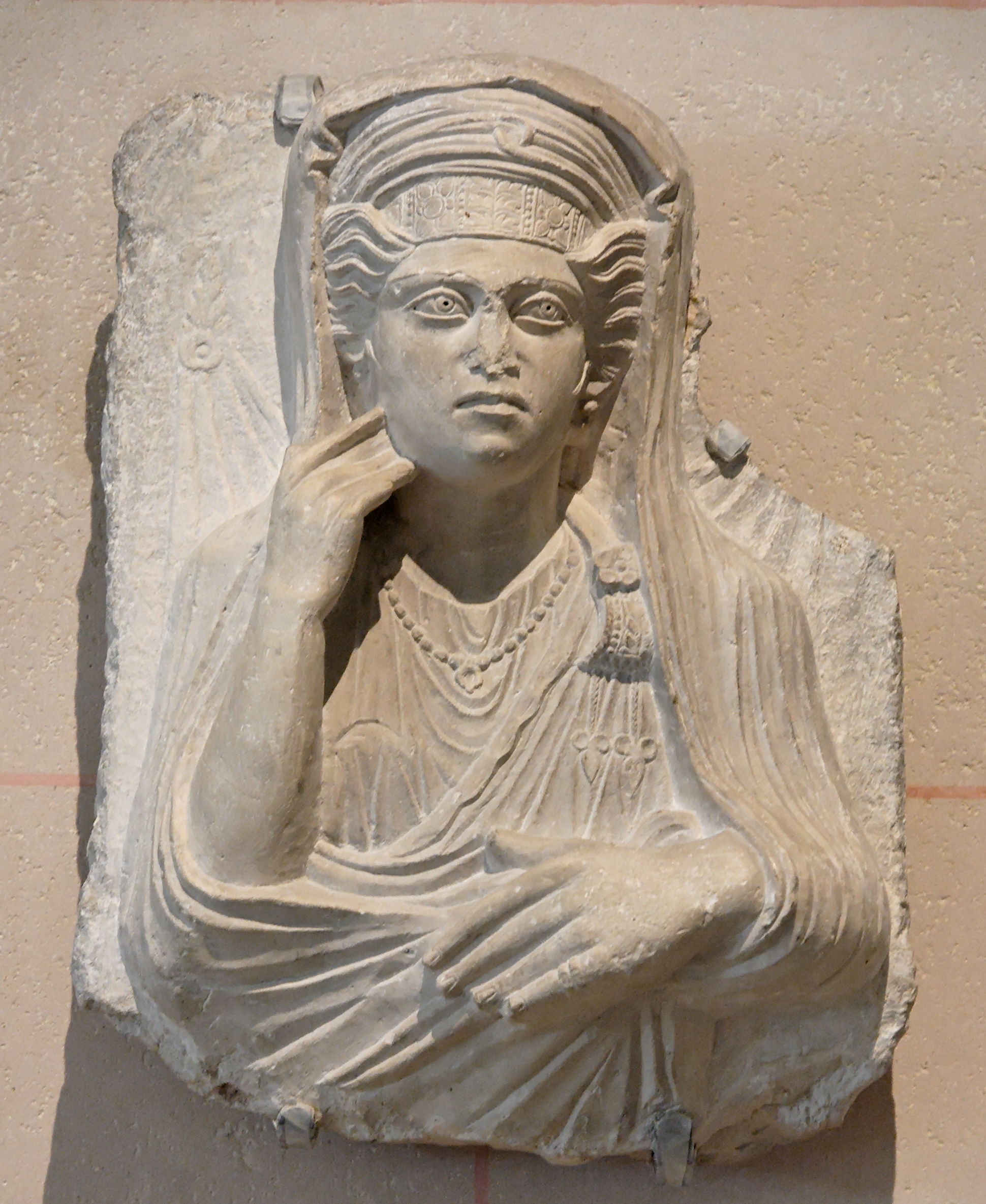
Grave relief of a woman in Palmyra

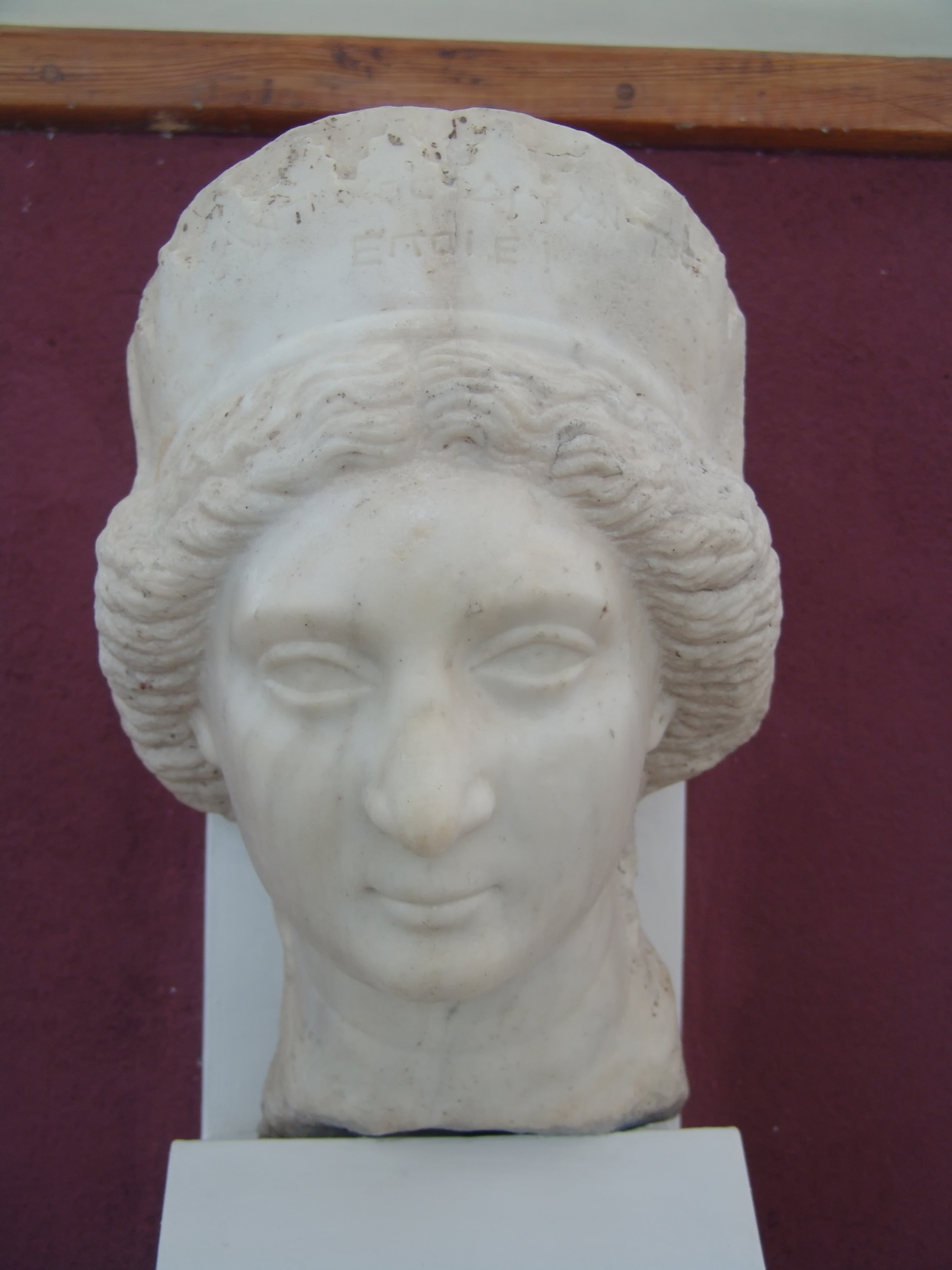
Sculpture of a queen or goddess found in Susa

These style elements are also present in the sculptures of Parthian culture. Sculptures in limestone, marble and bronze, are usually designed head-on. Even within group interaction among scenes figures are not observed participation, but instead completely oriented to the viewer.

Many examples of Parthian period sculpture found in Palmyra, where the tombs of the local upper class were richly decorated, depict the lives of the deceased. There were somewhere between three types of monuments. Locking plates, blocking the entrance of grave installations;. Sarcophagi decorated on the actual coffin box and lying on the lid of the deceased, usually on the side shown at a banquet. Few of these images give the impression of real portraits. The faces of the deceased seem stylized and glorified. Men and women are usually played back with the upper body and richly hung with jewels. Women usually wear Hellenistic clothing fashions while the men are depicted wearing traditionally Iranian clothing (especially pants). In Palmyra stone sculptures are present, but were probably cast in bronze. They decorated the streets of the city, however, they were later melted down. They were erected in honor of noble and wealthy citizens of the city. Many of the base inscriptions of these statues are preserved Statues honor deserving citizens are also attested in inscriptions from Parthian cities, but not all accounted for.:

...the people (honor) Soadu, son of Bolyada ... and he was honored by resolutions and still images from the boule and the people, and was at the time ... honored by the caravans and by individual citizens due to his repeated blessings with four statues on columns in Tertradeion at the public expense and with three other statues in Spasinou Charax and Vologesias

Hatra in contrast, had numerous stone statues representing deities or local rulers and their family members. The local upper class donated the statues of the temples to the city, where they were found by the excavations. Many of these works are precisely dated by inscriptions of the donor and provide a good chronological framework. There is also sometimes even the mention of a sculptor's name, such as Aba or Schabaz. In addition to works in the classical Greco-Hellenistic tradition (especially of classical deities) they show the people sitting or standing, facing front and dressed in Parthian fashion with rich regalia. The men wear shoes, pants and a tunic over it. Over the tunic some men wear a kind of jacket. Often you can see on the left side a dagger, a sword on his right hip. Kings wear a tiara with a diadem or tiara with the image of an eagle. The right hand is usually raised in a gesture of adoration to the top, the left hand holds a sword or a palm branch. Other statues carry in both hands a statue of God. There is striking attention to detail. The patterns of the substances, weapons and jewelry are reproduced exactly.

At Susa a marble woman's head was found (Tehran, Iranian National Museum, Inv. No. 2452), which is one of the most famous works of art from the Parthian era. The head is proportionally slightly larger than real life. The face is broad with a long thin nose. The eyeballs are not modeled, but the pupil is indicated by a dot. The mouth is softly modeled with rather thin lips. The woman wears a heavy crown, on which the inscription: made by Antiochus, son of Dryas. On the back, a veil is seen. The back of the statue as a whole worked summarily, indicating that the head was designed for the frontal view. She surely was once embedded in a separately crafted body. The high quality of the work sparked an extensive debate in the research of Parthian art. The modeling of the face is reminiscent of Hellenistic art. Also, the headgear is similar to Hellenistic styles, but other details are clearly Iranian. Accordingly, it has been suggested that this is a work from the Greco-Roman world, which was reworked locally.

The most famous Parthian art work is the bronze statue of a local prince found in the Iranian province of Bachtiyārī at Shami. It was found by farmers in the remains of a small shrine of Greek gods and Seleucid kings, who eventually became the cult of the gods and also of past rulers. The statue is almost perfectly preserved, with only the hands missing. It is made of two parts and consists of the body and the head, which was carried out separately and fitted later. The prince is standing in Parthian clothes with a dagger on the side. He wears medium length hair and a mustache. He wears long trousers and a tunic that leaves his chest partially exposed. The figure is aligned in front, radiating power and authority, even if the head seems disproportionately small. Daniel Schlumberger remarks that there is certainly a specific type that would have dressed thus. Here is a typical Parthian nobleman, as can be seen in the details of the costume. An inscription at the base assigns it to a specific person. The dating is uncertain, ranging somewhere from the 2nd century BC to the 2nd century AD The prince has not yet been identified, though, is often assumed to be Surenas. The high quality of the work sparked a lively debate about the place of manufacture. Theories range from Susa to an artist from Palmyra, who created the work on site.

In addition to these sculptures in a more oriental/Parthian style, there were remains in a more Hellenistic style. Many of these works were probably imported from the Roman Empire. Most works of art in Hatra were likely imported. Other sculptures in a more Hellenic style date from the time when the art in Parthia was strongly oriented to the Hellenistic art, or may even originate from the time of the Seleucid empire.

At Seleucia on the Tigris, there is a statue of a goddess, which clearly originates in Hellenistic tradition. It is a 56 cm Kompositfigur from Marnor made of alabaster, plaster and bitumen. The woman is wearing a chiton and a cloak over it. On her head there is a tiara. Accurate dating of the work is almost impossible, but it was found in sections of the city by the excavators and is associated with the conquest of the city by the Roman emperor Trajan (116 AD). From the same town comes a bronze figure of Hercules. According to the inscription it comes from the Charakene (a part of the Parthian Empire) around 150 AD as booty in the city and there adorned the Temple of Apollo. The work is clearly Hellenistic, but it was in the Charakene for nearly 300 years before it came to Seleucia. Obviously, there were Parthian demands to continue works of art in Hellenistic style.

=== Examples of Parthian sculpture ===
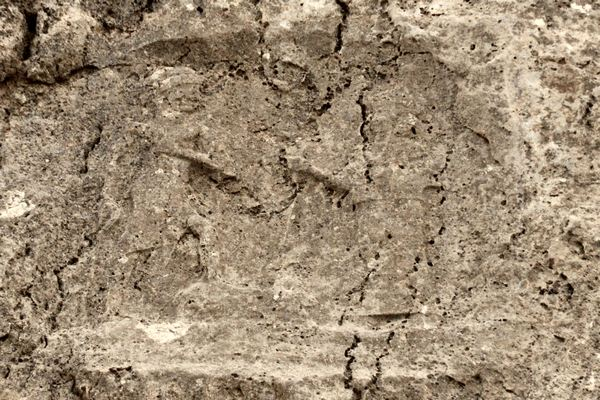
Sar-e Pol-e Zahab, relief, Iran

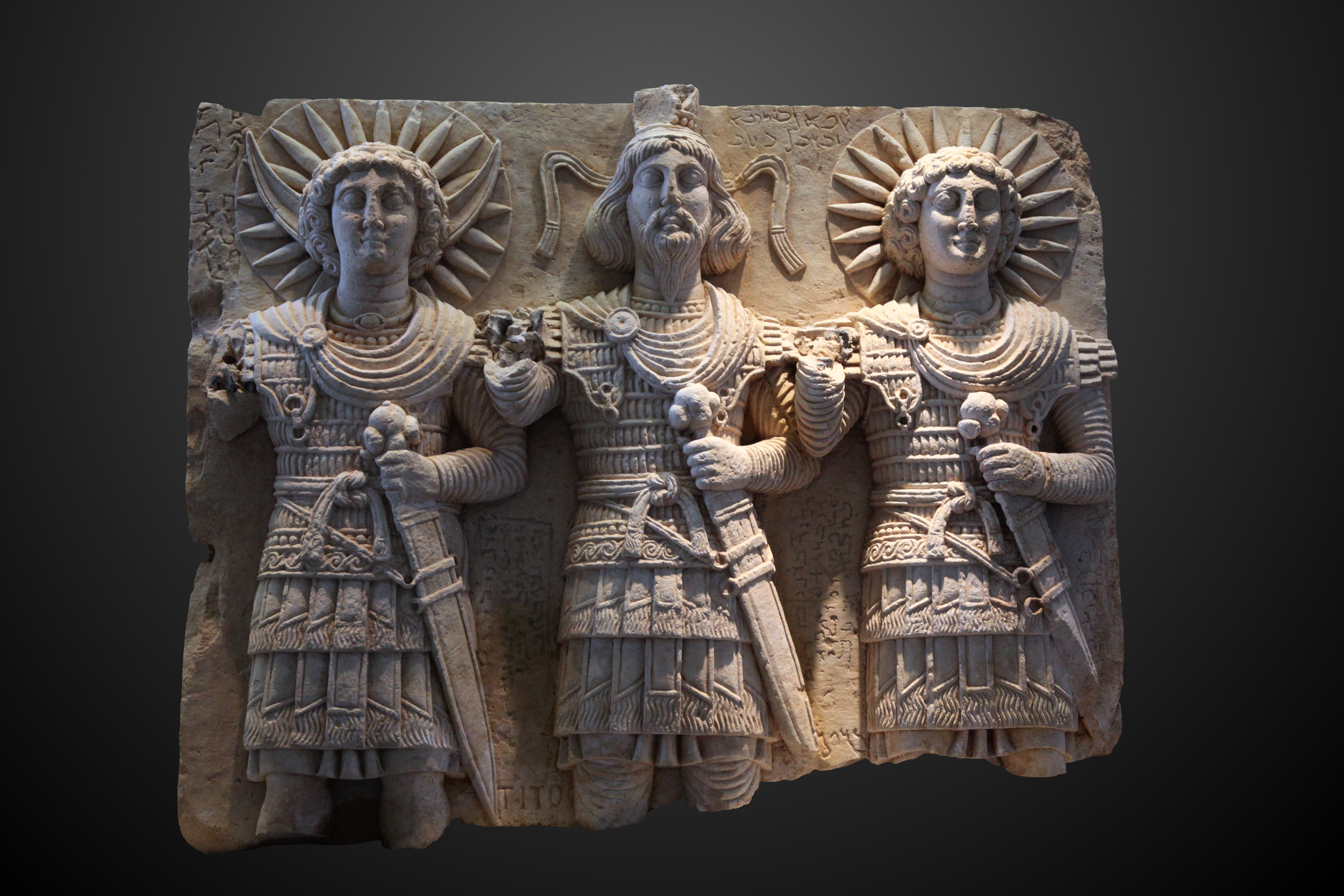
Relief from Palmyra, 1st century CE

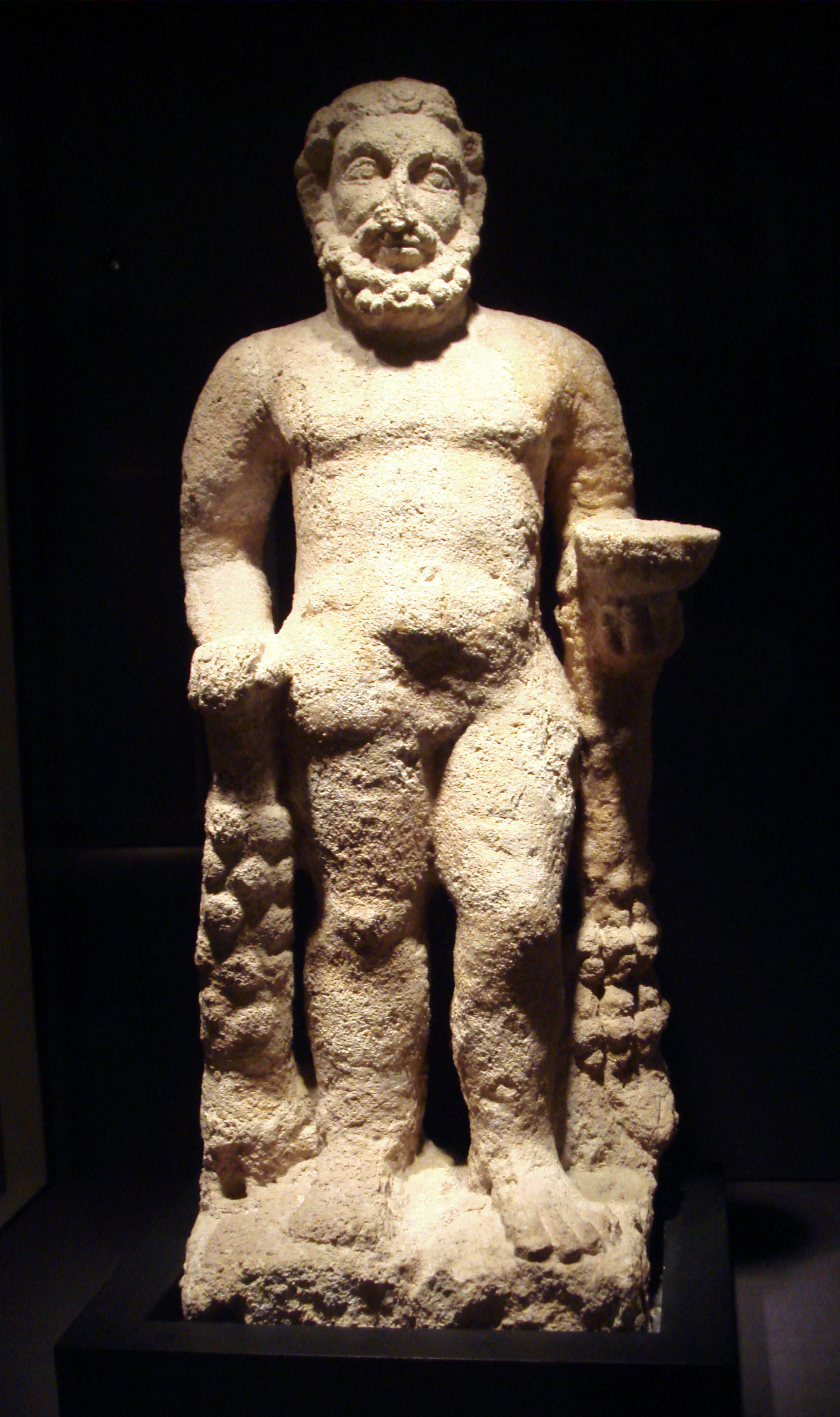
Statue of Hercules, 1st–2nd century CE

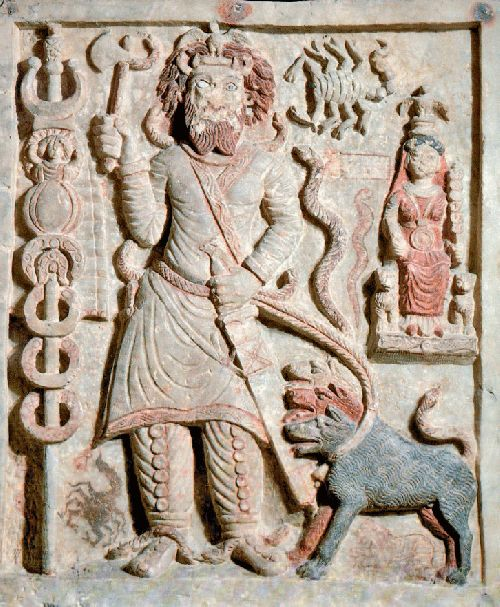
Nirgul tablet from Hatra, 1st–2nd century CE

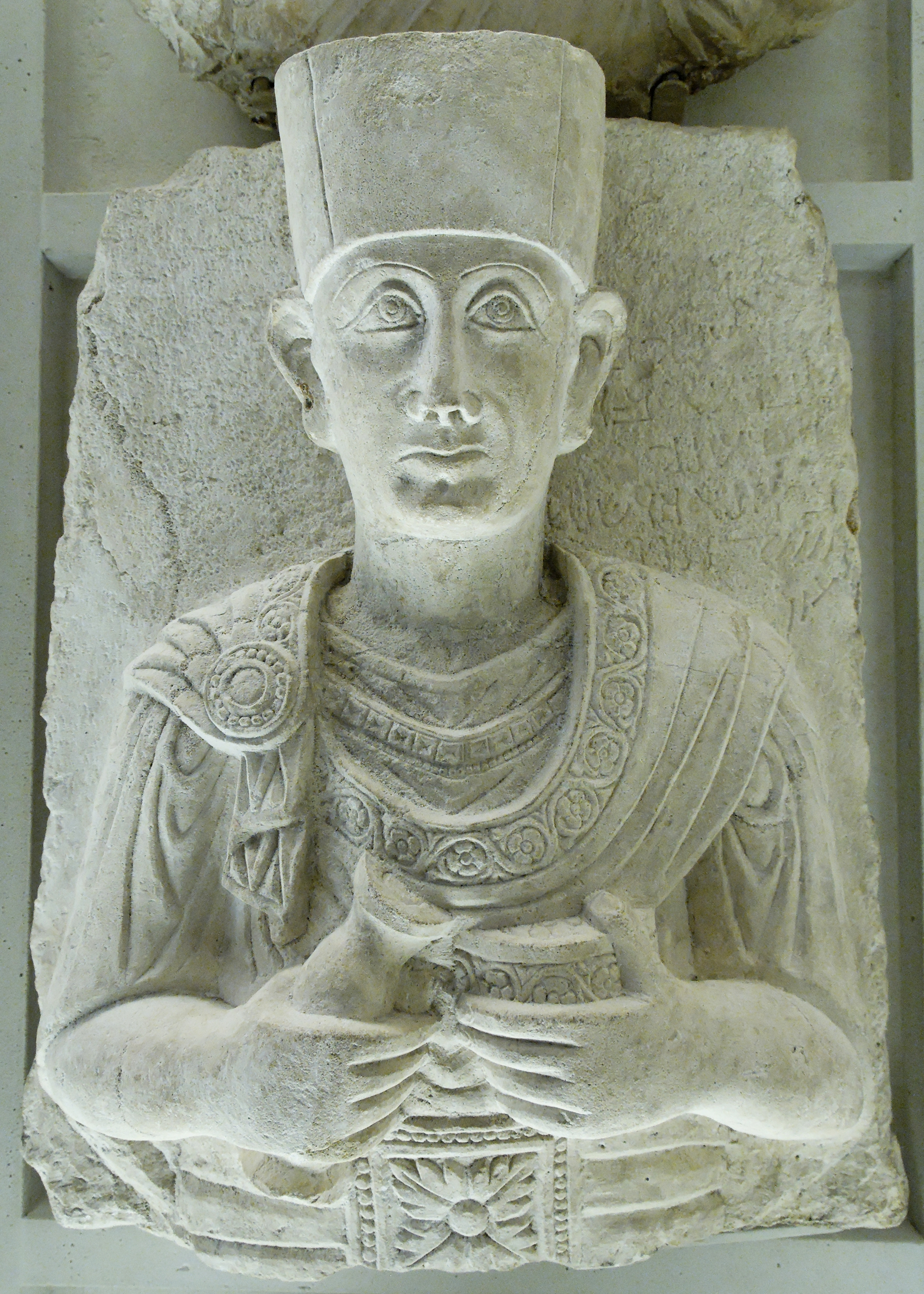
Grave relief from Palmyra, 176 AD

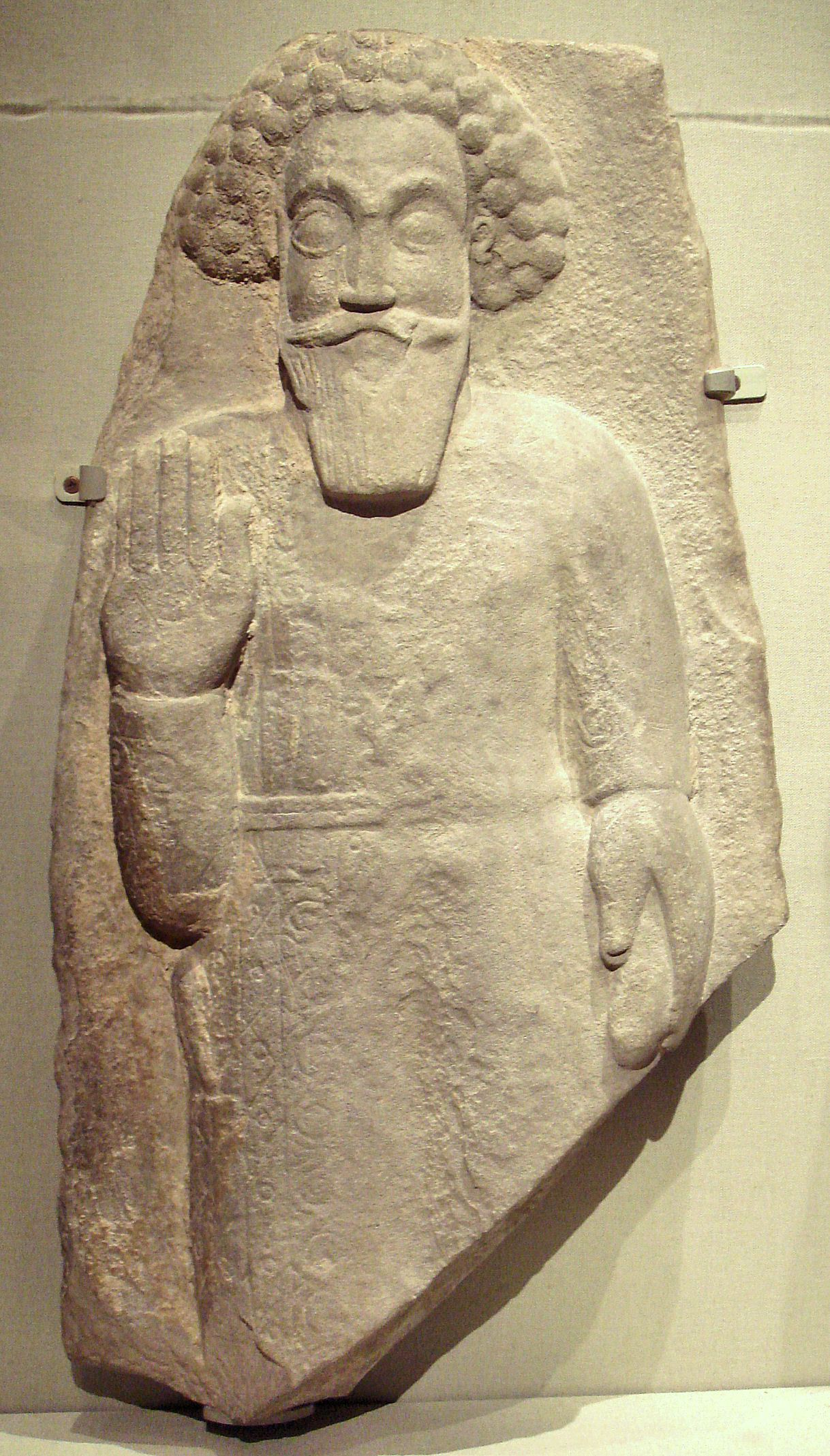
Possibly a Parthian ruler, 2nd century CE

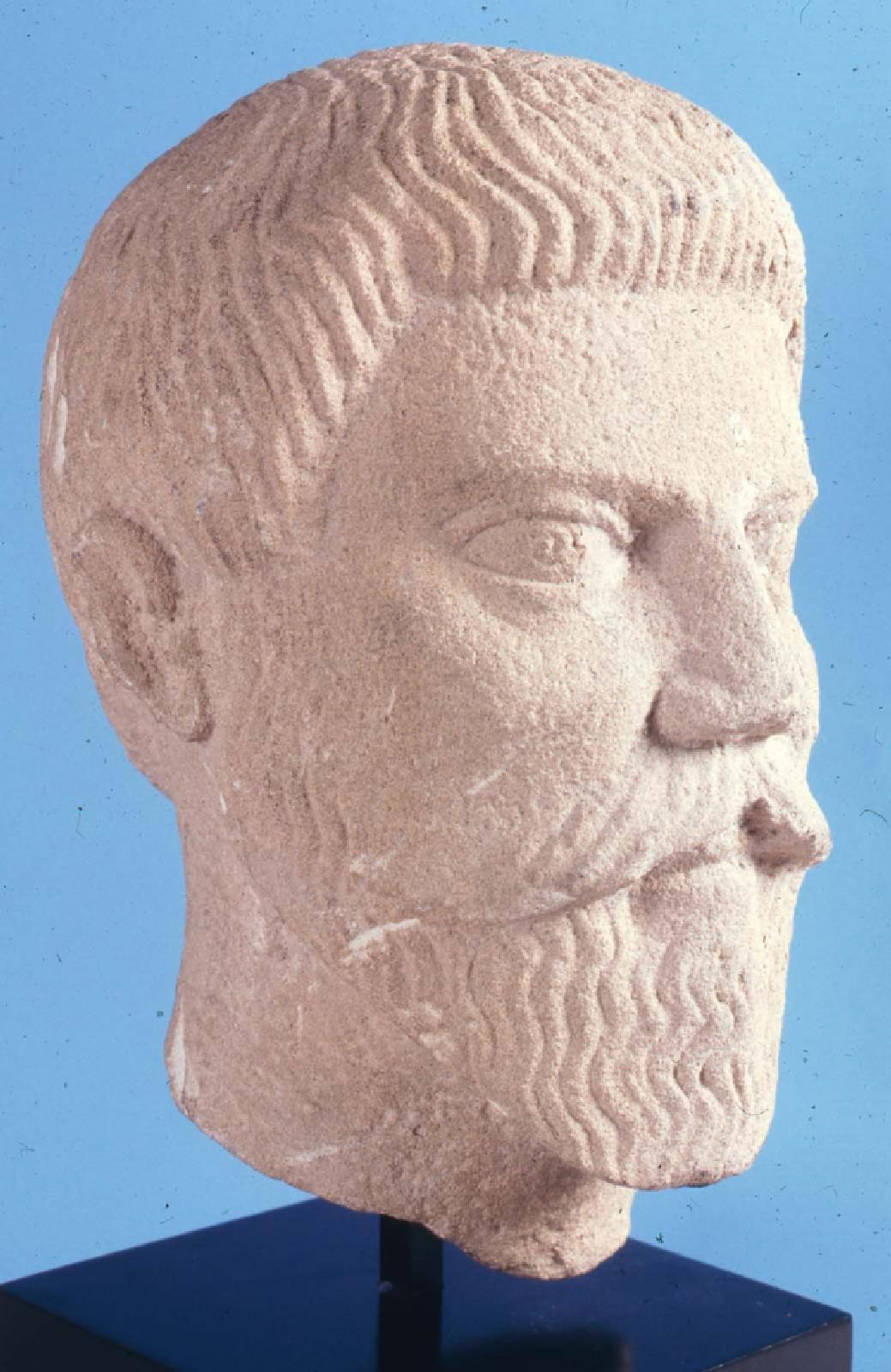
Head of a Parthian dignitary, 2nd century CE

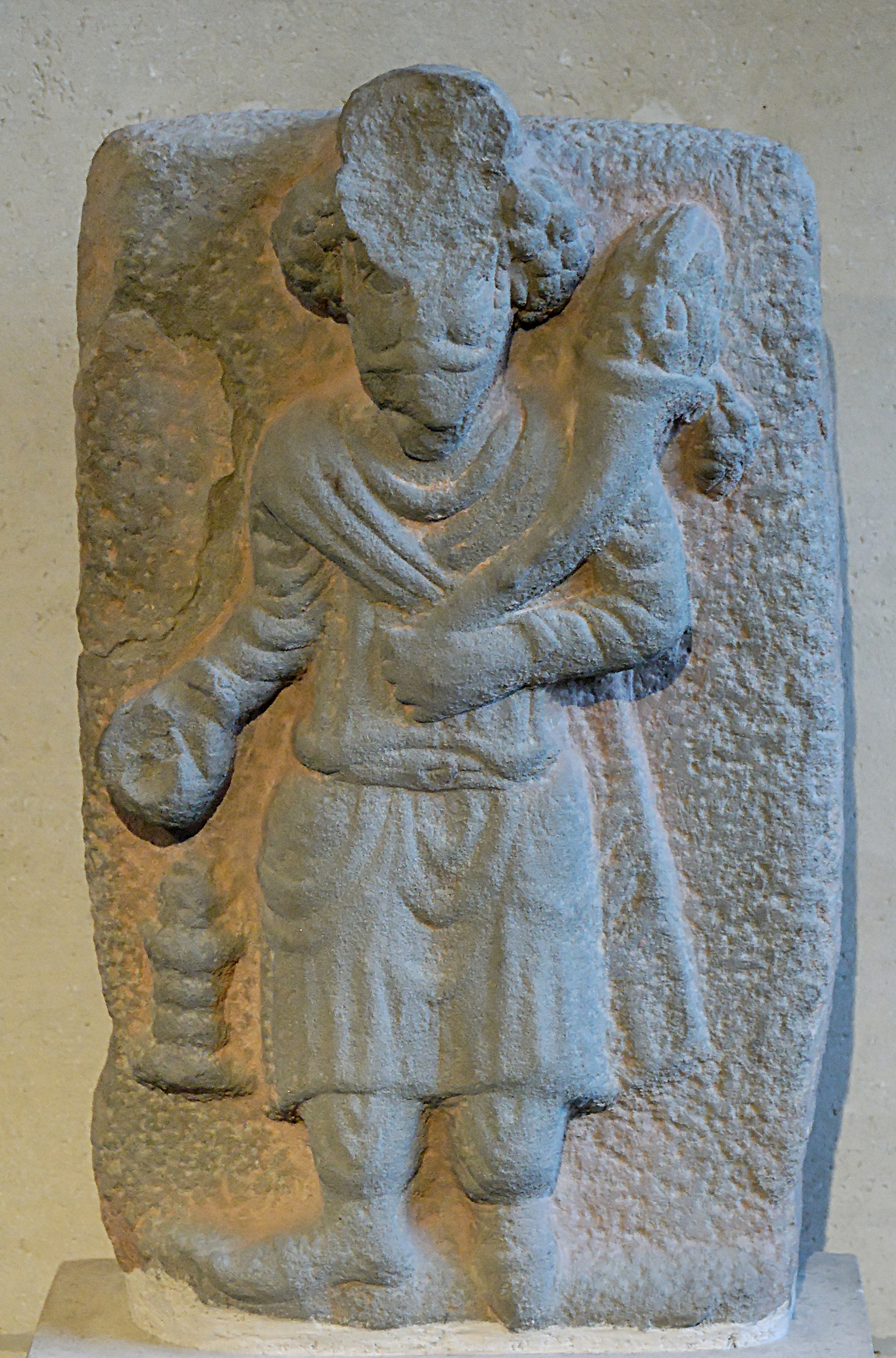
Parthian Ruler, 2nd–3rd century CE

== Reliefs ==
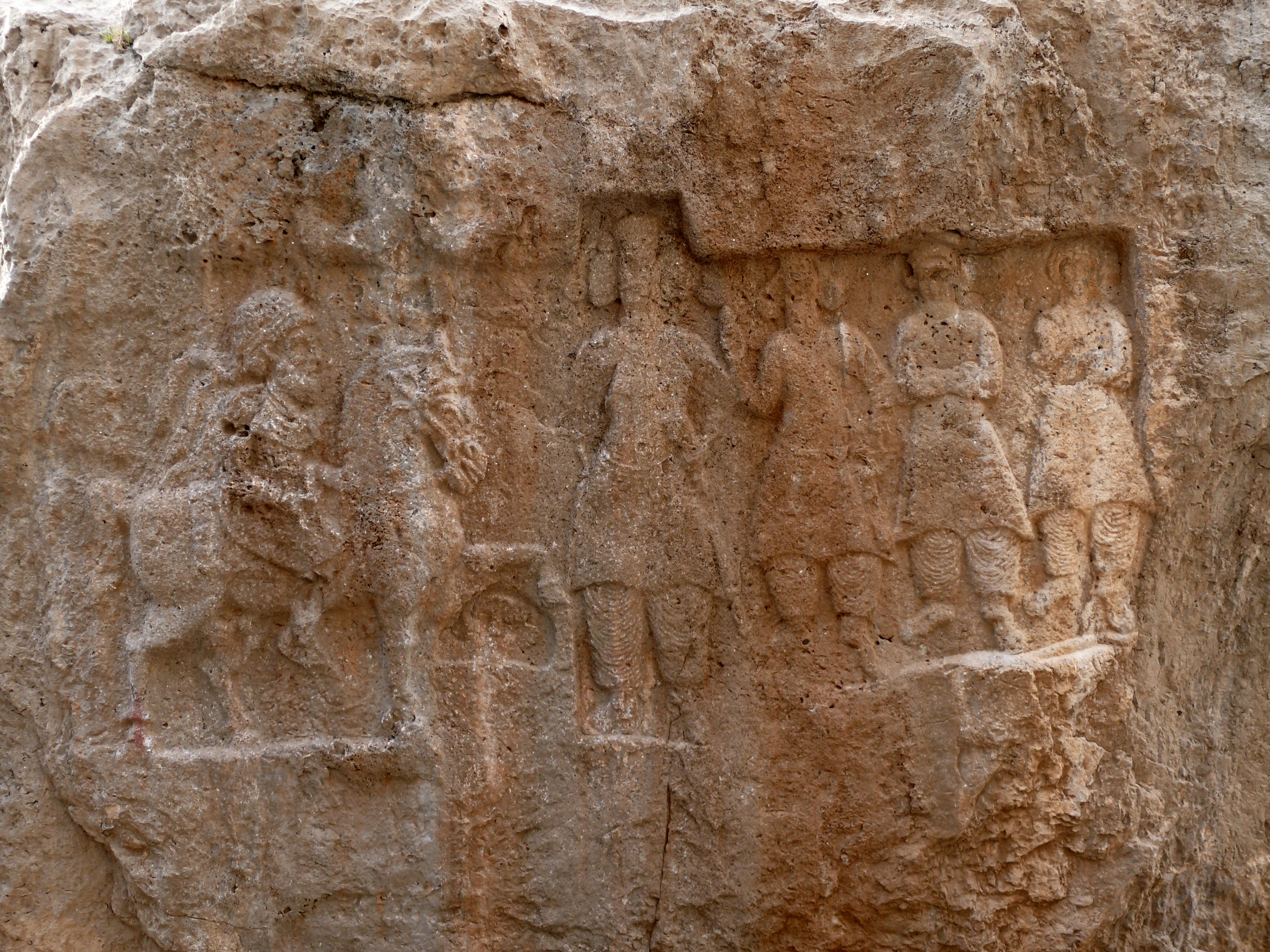
Relief of Mithridates I's victory

There are essentially two types of relief. There are carvings of a hand with a back plate that are very closely related technically and formally with complete sculptures. In addition, there are also flat reliefs, in which the figures are only a few centimeters carved into the stone. These reliefs are continuing Assyrian and Persian, or pre-Hellenistic, traditions and are visually similar to paintings. Here, as in the painting, there are narrative representations. The figures are mostly frontally facing the viewer. Especially in southwest present-day Iran, in ancient Elymais, many rock reliefs were carved in open air sites in this style. Their execution is mostly rather coarse.

One of the most famous reliefs is a scene with six men at Hung-i Nauruzi. In the middle of the figure, the main character is in frontal view in Parthian costume. To the right are three other men, though slightly smaller carved into the stone. On the left is a rider on a horse. The figure is shown in profile. Behind the rider is followed by another man, again in profile. The stylistic difference between the Hellenistic style portrayed in more riders and reproduced in the Parthian style in other characters led to the assumption that the four men were later carved into the rock on the right side. The rider probably represents a king, and has been identified as Mithridates I, who conquered Elymais in 140/139 BC when Parthian art was still largely Hellenistic. Accordingly, the relief is celebrating his victory. This interpretation has however been rejected and for the theory the rider is a local ruler of the Elymais. Other reliefs often show groups of men, single men, and also the figure of Heracles. Generally older reliefs are Hellenistic while newer are more Iranian-Parthian by fashion.

== Architecture ==
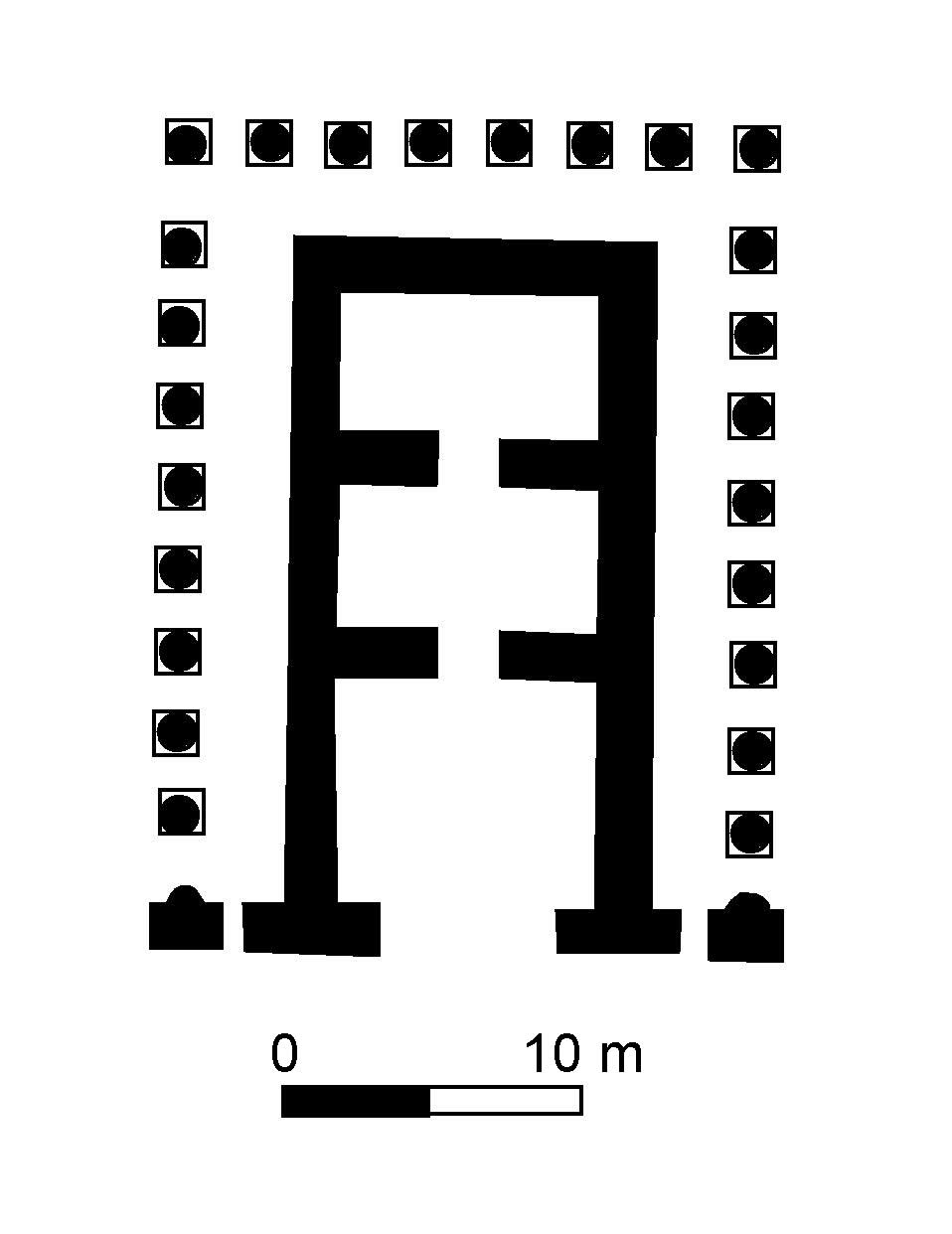
Parthian Temple in Assyria

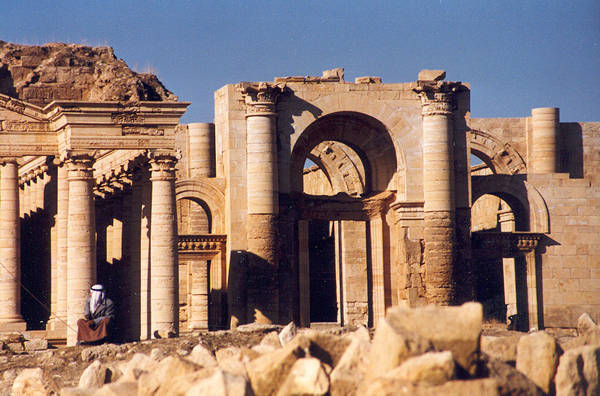
Temple in Hatra

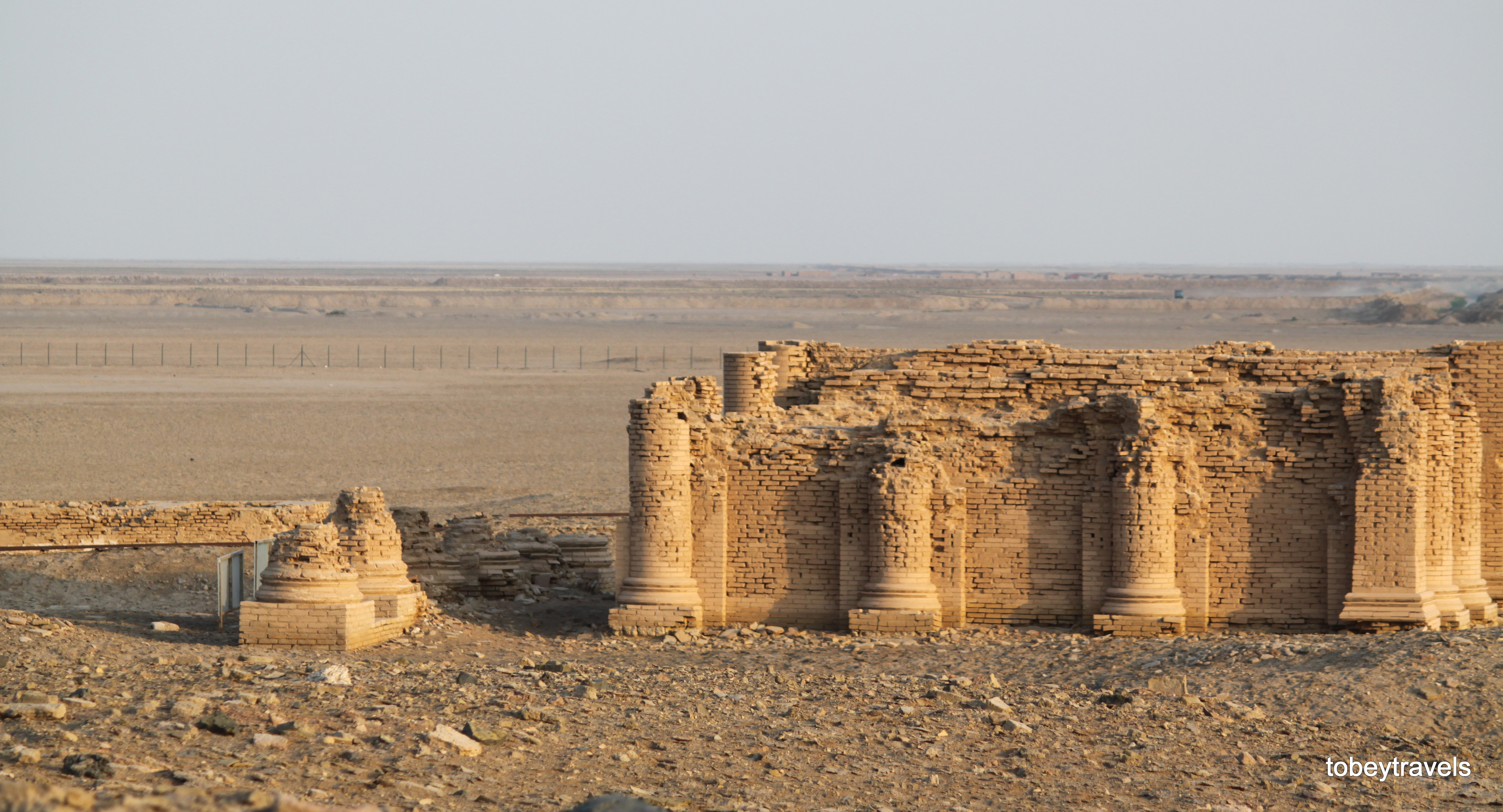
The Parthian Temple of Charyios in Uruk

In architecture, there is a mixture of Greek and Oriental elements with new forms, especially as a remarkable new design with a large, open hall to a courtyard. This was usually arched. There is a structural unit which is not actually closed, but not fully open. Another peculiarity of the Parthian architecture is the alienation of classical building structures.

In Assyria, a Parthian palace modeled after Greek style is present, with a courtyard entrance although with some differences. At the center of the palace was a large courtyard, at each of the four sides was an arch. The facades of the courtyard were richly decorated with stucco.

The temple of the Sun Mithras in Hatra resembles at first glance a mix of a Mesopotamian and Greco-Roman temple. The kind of juxtaposition of certain classical structures however is Parthian. A Cella standing at a lectern is surrounded on three sides by two rows of columns. The front is adorned by a staircase, which is flanked on the sides of the outer row of columns. The outer row of pillars standing on the base and is decorated with compositional chapters. The inner row of columns stands on the podium and has Ionic capitals. The pediment of the temple front shows a bow. The architraves and pediments are richly decorated with architectural decoration.

A similar temple was found in Assyria, consisting of three consecutive rooms with the Blessed Sacrament as the last room. Around the temple columns are present, resembling a Greek temple. The fact that the columns are only on three sides, and that the front was not decorated with columns indicates a particularly Parthian fashion. In many Greek temples, columns would not be present on one side, but that would rarely be the entrance or front of the temple.

Other temples seem to be built more on ancient Eastern traditions. In the center of the temple complex of Hatra is a series of juxtaposed arches, with two main arches, flanked by several small rooms. There are also six smaller arches in the surrounding space. The complex is also on an elevated podium. The facade is divided by pilasters. It is again found with rich architectural decorations, especially sculptures of individuals, and also of animals.

In Uruk there still stands the temple of Gareus built entirely of burnt brick, with dimensions of about 10 meters long and 8 meters wide. The interior resembles Babylonian temples with a vestibule and a cella. Even the cult niche with an upstream panel is Babylonian. The facade of the building is decorated with blind arcades. In front of the building were six columns with Ionic capitals . Another architectural decoration consisted of egg-and-dart Lesbian cymatium. A frieze depicts dragons and looks more oriental. Overall, we find here again a mixture of Hellenistic and Oriental influences.

The temples at Dura Europos are architecturally rather simple. There were several rooms arranged around a central courtyard. The 'Holy of Holies' was located mostly on the back of the unit and could be noted by columns at the entrance. The other rooms around the courtyard were used for banquets, as a priest's chamber, or as places of worship . The Blessed Sacrament was often painted magnificently.

The temple in Palmyra appears Hellenistic–Roman at first sight and it is often only very small details that distinguish it from those of the Mediterranean world. Overall, the architecture of the city is more Roman–Syrian with a few idiosyncrasies that are typical Parthia . The Baal temple stands within a walled courtyard, which is decorated with columns and forms a Rhodian peristyle. The actual temple in the center of the complex is a peripteros Temple. Unusual, however, is that the main entrance has a staircase located on the long side of the temple and not on the short side. The roof of the temple is decorated with stepped battlements.

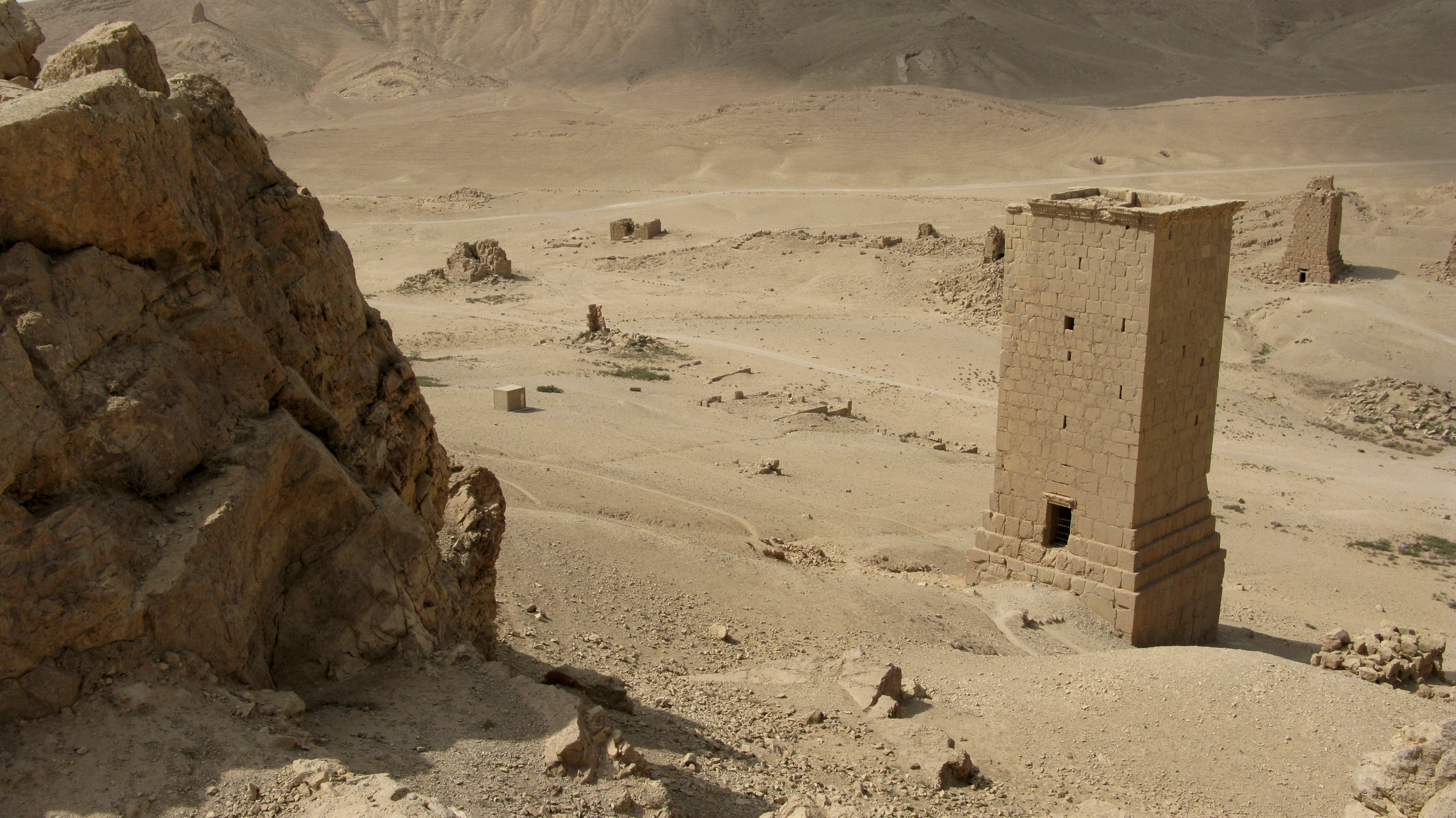
Gravetowers in Palmyra

In the necropolis of Palmyra there were several types of graves. There are architecturally complex grave towers, which are also present at Dura Europos on the Euphrates, as well as at other places, but not in other parts of Syria. These are square buildings that were up to five floors high. The interior offered space for several hundred dead and was often richly decorated with sculptures. Those tombs are a development of Semitic traditions and have no relation with Iranian architecture.

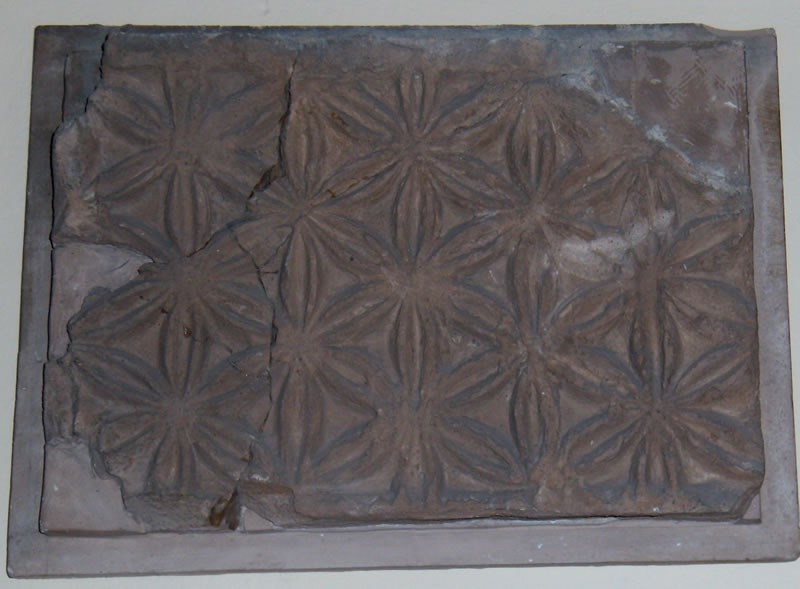
Example of Stucco Decoration

Abundant ornamental stucco architectural decoration were used in Parthian buildings, on the one hand continuing to Greek pattern, but also has its own new Parthian pattern. The stucco itself had been introduced by the Greeks, and soon found popularity in the region under the Parthians. The stucco wall patterns can be found on patch columns and ornamental bands. The pillars of stucco are usually placed only on the wall and are purely ornamental elements. They have no support function and do not give the wall depth, as was common in Greco-Roman architecture. The pillars were usually composed of materials that were available locally. In Mesopotamia, therefore many buildings are built of brick, and also stucco. In contrast, Hatra and Palmyra limestone is the predominant material. Stucco here, however, is rarely witnessed. Arches were abundantly used in Parthian architecture, especially above halls.

== Terracotta ==
There was a substantial number of terracotta figures and figurines made of this material at many Parthian sites. These can also be stylistically divided into two groups. There is on the one hand purely Greek or Greek influenced figures and on the other hand those in the Near East and later in the Parthian style. The Greek style figure of Herakles was immensely popular because it was equated with the Parthian Verethragna god. Greek fashions also were responsible for depictions of nude women, which was a largely Greek custom. Parthian types are mainly clothed male figures.

One of the most major finds for Parthian terracotta was at Seleucia on the Tigris where multiple, extremely detailed figures were found. Astonishingly, there are both Greek and Oriental types present at the site, juxtaposing Parthian history in almost all eras in one spot. There is only another find like this in Susa, where similar discoveries were made.

=== Examples of Parthian terracotta and small sculpture ===
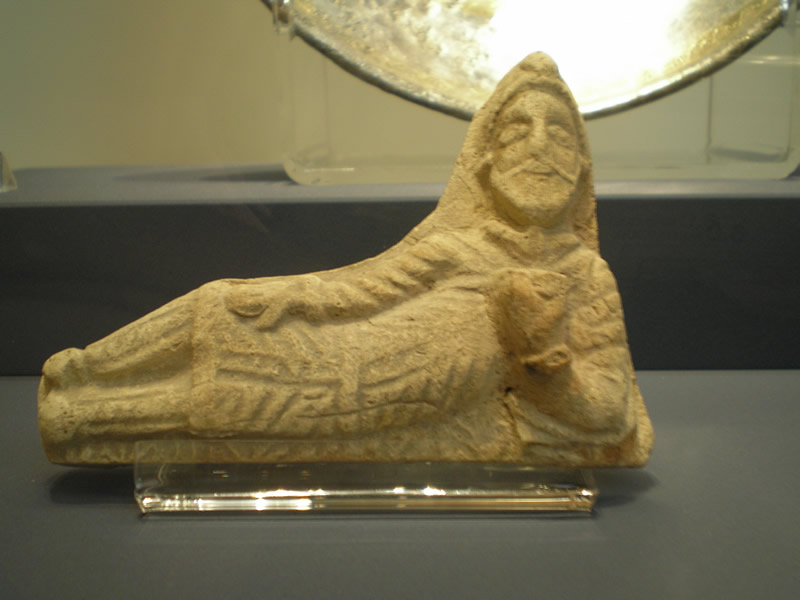
Terracotta figure in Parthian style

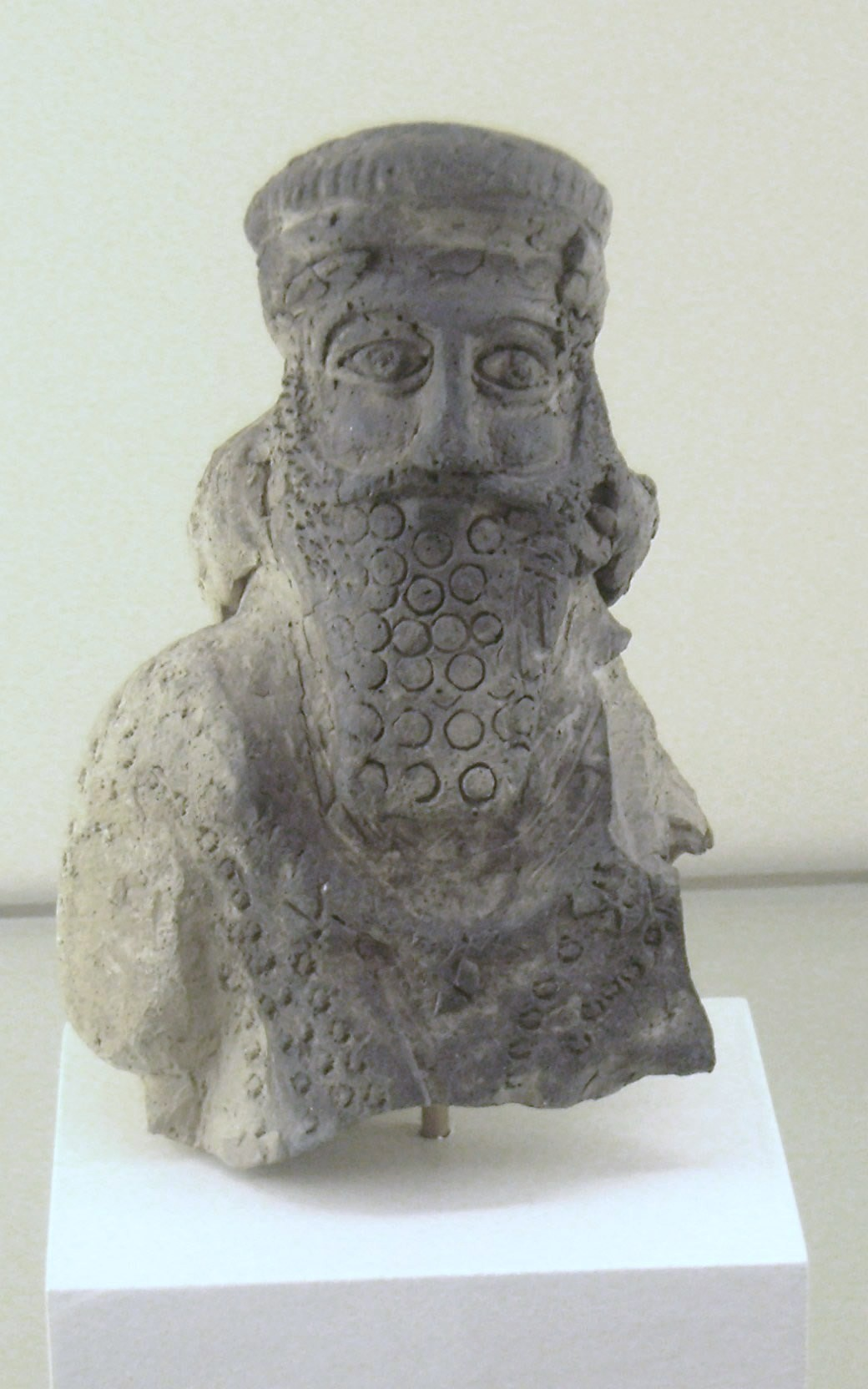
Parthian King Ashur

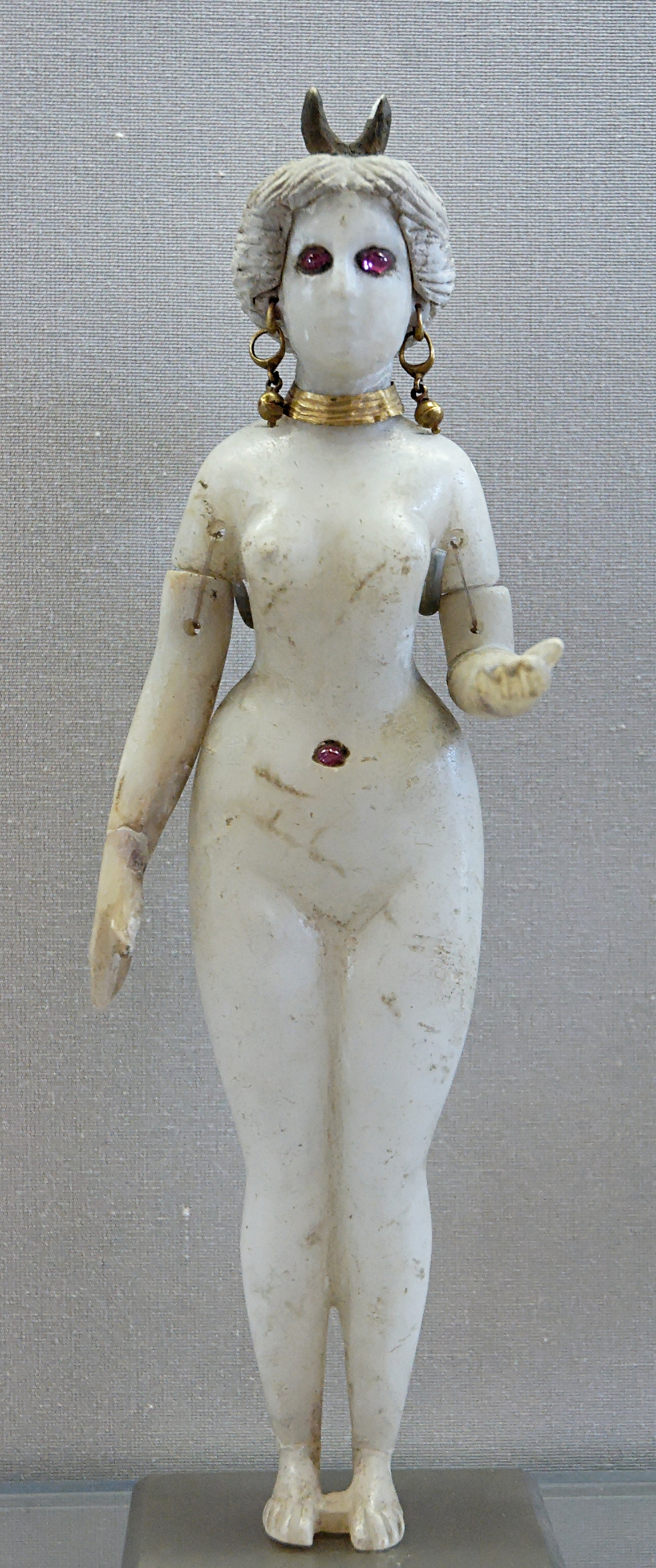
Figure of a goddess

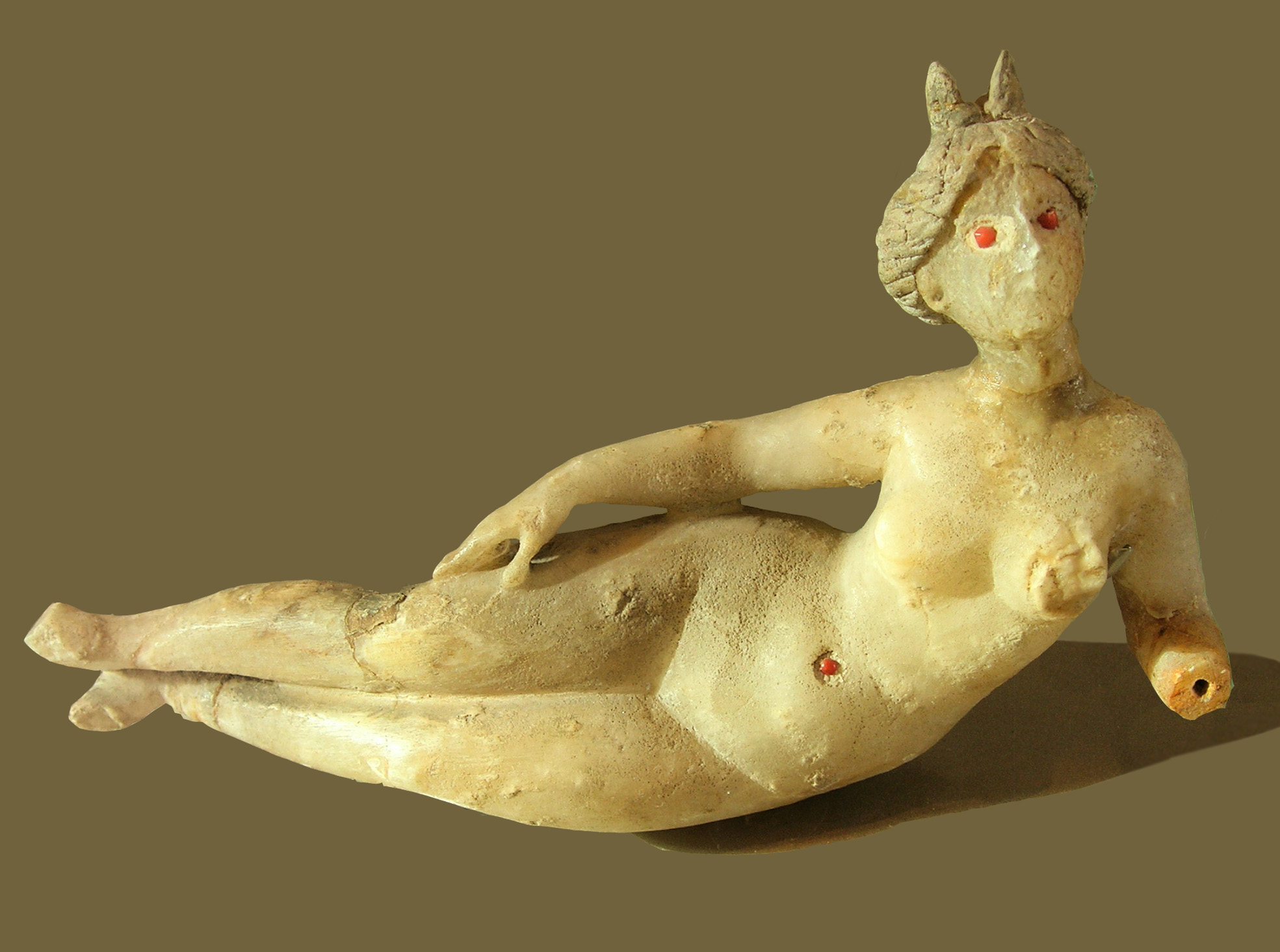
Figure of a goddess

== Frontal view interpretation ==
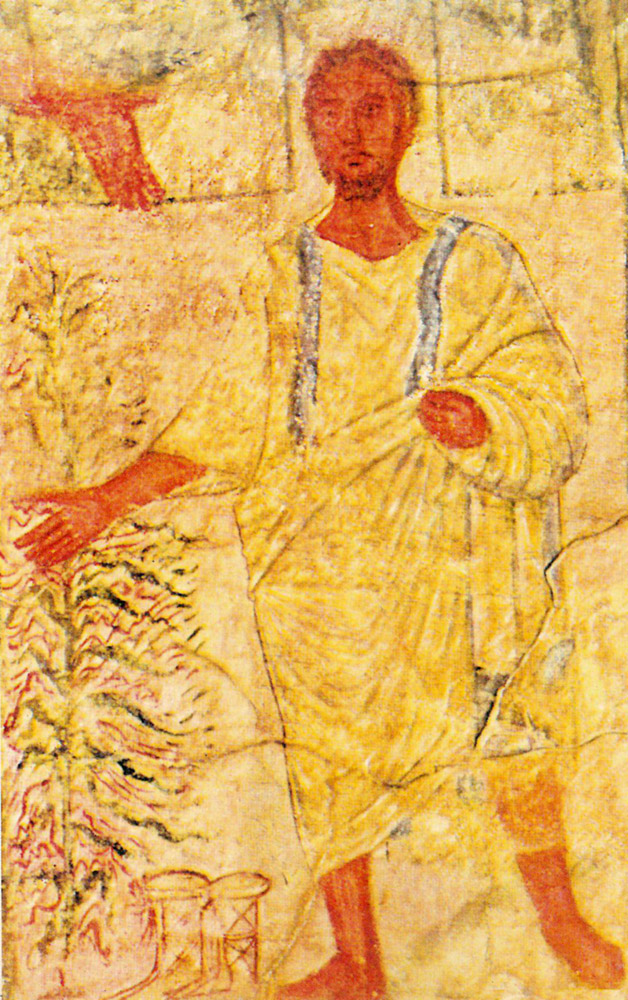
Moses and the Burning Bush, found at the Synagogue of Dura-Europos

The frontal view of the figures in paintings, sculptures, and relief is not an invention of the Parthians. In the ancient Near East the custom was to depict figures in the profile view, although the frontal view was always present to some degree, especially in sculpture. The frontal view of the flat was used in the ancient Near East to highlight certain figures. Daniel Schlumberger argues that these are always special figures which particular attention given to be perceived as larger than life and more important than other figures in the depiction. The figures, gods and heroes, depicted frontally were not simple copies of life in a different material, they were instead meant to be viewed by the observer as alive. They were virtually present.

The art of the ancient Near East, and also in archaic Greece, used only the frontal and profile view. Only classical Greek style introduced an intermediate step, especially the three-quarter view. Representations of the classical Greeks tried the illusion of life in all its forms. The characters are totally preoccupied with themselves and ignore the viewer. The frontal view is also found here, but is only one of many possibilities. Parthian art certainly took over the frontal view of Hellenistic art, but it appears the Parthians in their art again took recourse with the presence of the Ancient Orient. The Parthian art is not an illusion and tried to capture the fleeting nature of life. Rather, they tried to give the figures durability. They tried to capture the true content of life and not just the outer shell. The effect of such methods is often that the viewer feels transcended.

== Conclusion and outlook ==
In the 2nd century AD, the Parthian Empire had to contend with numerous internal and external enemies. The Romans marched several times through Mesopotamia and the Antonine Plague seems to have raged in Parthia . This crisis had an obvious negative impact on the production of art. While much of the better known Parthian art remained the same, because of its natural grandeur and transcendence, some are obvious symptoms of decline in the late 2nd century AD. The coin legends are barely legible. From Susa comes a relief badly sculpted and with figures out of proportion.

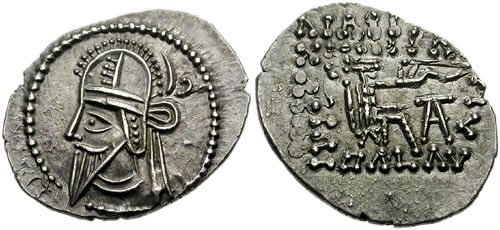
Coin of Vologases VI

By 226 AD the Parthian dynasty was eliminated and replaced by the Sasanians. In large parts of Mesopotamia and Persia Parthian art simply disappeared, although certain artistic traditions, such as stucco reliefs and riding scenes, continued under the Sassanids. In Syria, however, Parthian art style continued for some time since it did not come under Sasanian influence. Only with the fall of these cities (Hatra shortly after 240, Dura Europos at 256, Palmyra at 272) did Parthian art disappear from view. In the Syrian and Armenian illuminations of the 6th to 10th centuries, however, many Parthian elements resurged that attest to a continued life of this style.

Specifically the stringent frontal view of Parthian art can be found in the art of Byzantium and the European Middle Ages, so it can rightly be stated that Parthian art had influenced Christian art for the next 1000 years. The architecture was much like that of the later Islamic world, with many arches and domes. In addition, the Parthian art also strongly beamed eastward and probably had a significant impact on Buddhist art and indirectly reached even as far as China.

== See also ==
- Ancient Greek art
- Ancient Greek architecture
- Etruscan art
- Hellenistic art
- Roman art
- Ancient Roman architecture
- Sasanian art

== Literature ==
- Michael Rostovtzeff: Dura and the Problem of Parthian Art Yale Classical Studies V, New Haven 1935.
- Harald Ingholt: Parthian sculptures from Hatra: Orient and Hellas in art and religion. The academy, New Haven 1954.
- Roman Ghirshman: Iran. Parther und Sasaniden. C. H. Beck, München 1962. (Universum der Kunst 3)
- Daniel Schlumberger: The Hellenized Orient: Greek Art and After Outside the Mediterranean World. Holle Verlag, Baden-Baden 1969. (1980, ISBN 3-87355-202-7)
- Daniel Schlumberger: Descendents of Greek Art Outside the Mediterranean. In: Franz Altheim, Joachim Rehork (Hrsg.): Der Hellenismus in Mittelasien. Darmstadt 1969, S. 281–405. (Wege der Forschung, vol. 91)
- Malcolm A. R. Colledge: The Parthians Thames and Hudson, London 1967.
- Malcolm A. R. Colledge: Parthian art London 1977.
- Boris j. Stawiskij: The Peoples of Central Asia in the Light of their Monuments Keil Verlag, Bonn 1982, ISBN 3-921591-23-6.
- Trudy S. Kawami: Monumental art of the Parthian period in Iran. Brill, Leiden 1987, ISBN 90-6831-069-0.
- Hans Erik Mathiesen: Sculpture in the Parthian Empire. Aarhus 1992, ISBN 87-7288-311-1.
- John Boardman: The Diffusion of Classical Art in Antiquity. Thames and Hudson, London 1994.
- Michael Sommer: Hatra. History and culture of a caravan city in Roman-Parthian Mesopotamia. Mainz 2003, ISBN 3-8053-3252-1.
