= Tenth =

Tenth or the tenth may refer to:

== Numbers ==
- 10th, the ordinal form of the number ten
- One tenth, 1/10, or 0.1, a fraction, one part of a unit divided equally into ten parts.
  - the SI prefix deci-
  - tithe, a one-tenth part of something
- 1/10 of any unit of measurement, in particular:
  - One ten-thousandth of an inch

== Music ==
- Tenth (interval), typically major or minor, between the first and tenth note of a diatonic scale; an octave (seven scale degrees) plus a third
- Tenth, the tenth album by The Marshall Tucker Band
- .1, the EP by the British post-metal Bossk

== Other uses ==
- The Tenth, a fictional superhero appearing in American comic books
- Tenth of the month, a recurring calendar date on the tenth day of a month
- Tenth (administrative division), a geographic division used in the former American Province of West Jersey
- Talented tenth, a leadership class of African Americans in the early 20th century
- Tenth Island, Tasmania
- Tenth grade, in education

== See also ==
- 1/10 (disambiguation)
- Tenth Amendment to the United States Constitution
- 10th century and 10th century BC
