= 1/10 =

1/10, 1/10 or 110 may refer to:

- 1st Battalion, 10th Marines, an American artillery battalion
- January 10 in month-day format, a date
- October 1 in day-month format, a date
- The fraction, one tenth

== See also ==
- 1:10 radio-controlled off-road buggy
- One tenth
- Tenth (disambiguation)
- 110 (disambiguation)
