= Tenth of the month =

Recurring ordinal calendar date

The tenth of the month or tenth day of the month is the recurring calendar date position corresponding to the day numbered 10 of each month. In the Gregorian calendar (and other calendars that number days sequentially within a month), this day occurs in every month of the year, and therefore occurs twelve times per year.

- Tenth of January
- Tenth of February
- Tenth of March
- Tenth of April
- Tenth of May
- Tenth of June
- Tenth of July
- Tenth of August
- Tenth of September
- Tenth of October
- Tenth of November
- Tenth of December

In addition to these dates, this date occurs in months of many other calendars, such as the Bengali calendar and the Hebrew calendar.

== See also ==
- Tenth (disambiguation)
