= Temple of Gareus =

Parthian-era temple dedicated to Mesopotamian god Gareus

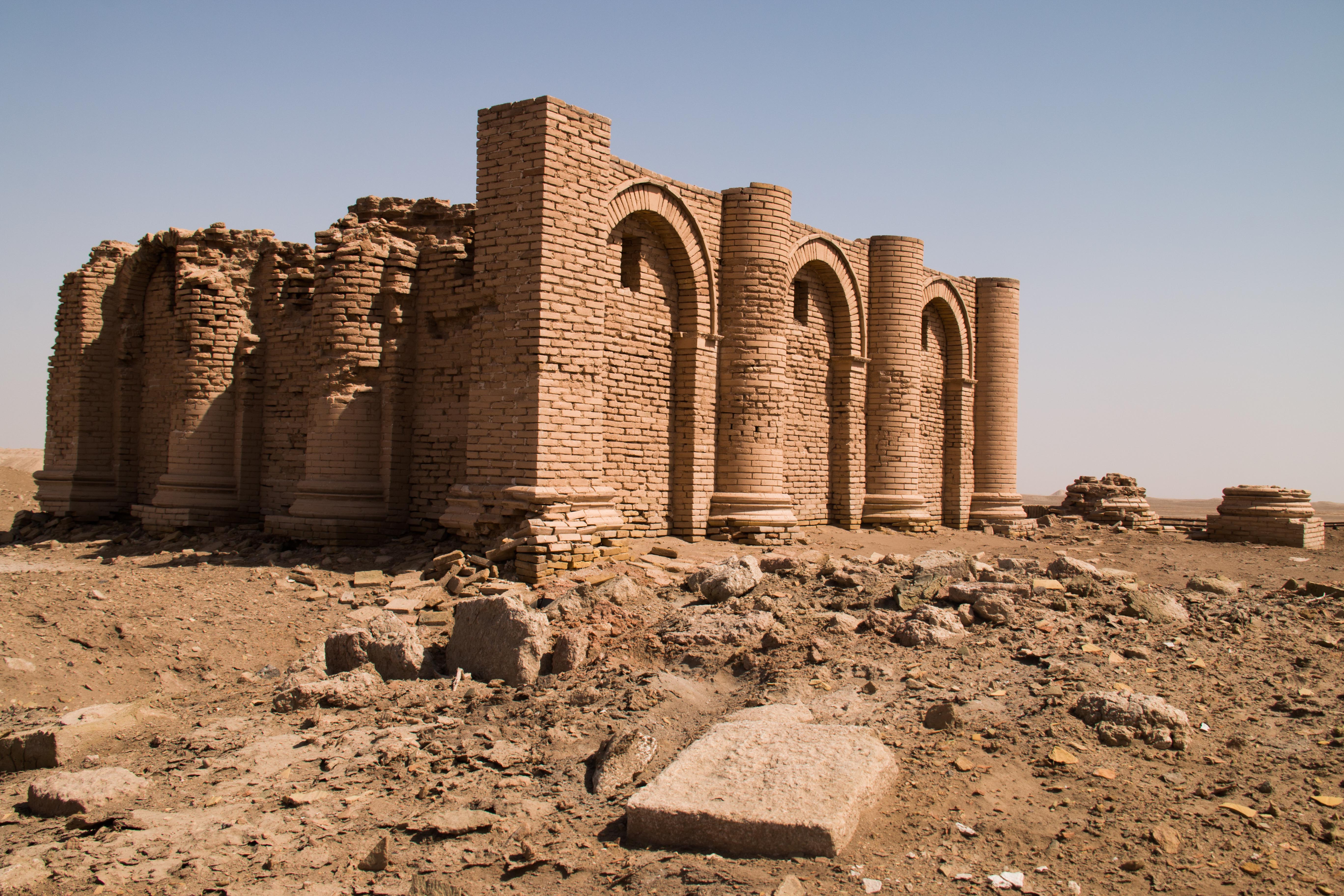
Temple of Gareus, 2014

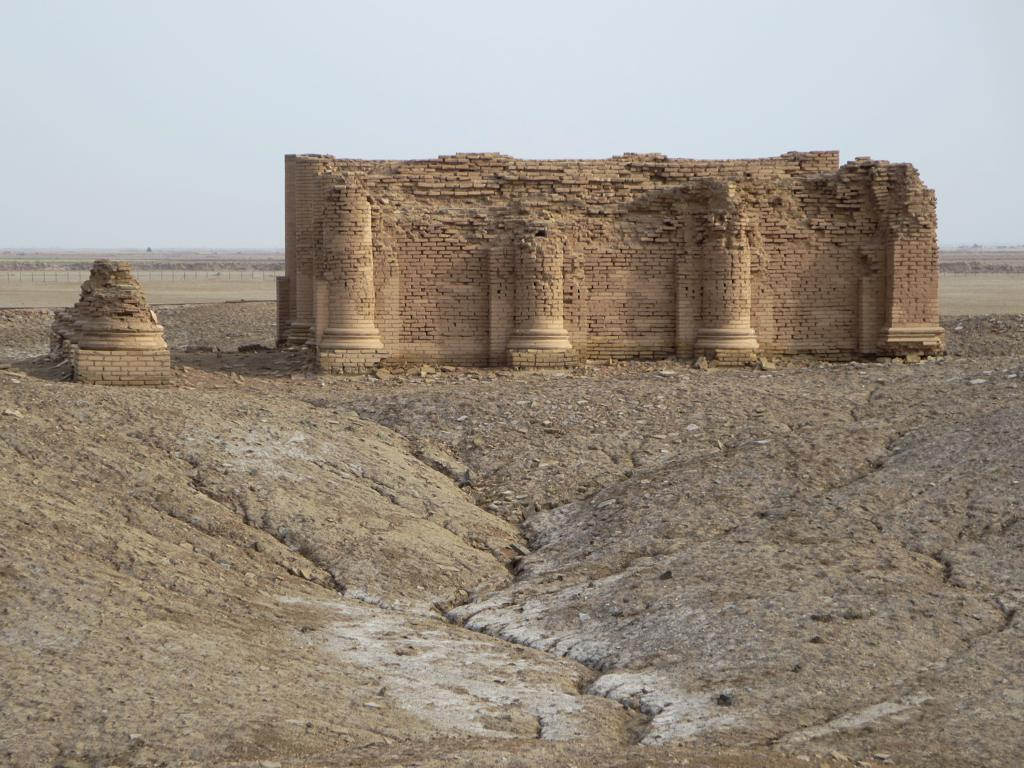
Temple of Gareus, 2016

The Temple of Gareus is located in Uruk in Iraq and probably dates to c. 110 AD. It dates back to the Parthian period, and is among the few surviving religious structures of Parthian date in Babylonia. The temple was made of fired bricks and consisted of a single room. The dimensions are 10.7 x 13.7 metres. The original height of the structure is unknown, but the surviving ruins of the structure are over eight metres high. The exterior was decorated with four half-columns with Ionic capitals and vaulted niches in between. In front of the temple's facade, there was a series of six columns. The structure was originally covered in plaster and decorated with a frieze depicting mythical creatures.

The building originally stood in a fortified area, which was slowly built over. Underneath the buildings there was a bath. The temple structure was partially restored in 1972.

An inscription was found near the temple, which refers to the otherwise unknown god Gareus. Because of this, the temple has been ascribed to this deity. The remains of various statues and two bronze feet, which were probably part of the cult image, were found in the temple area.

== Sources ==
- Downey, S. B. (1986). "ART IN IRAN iv. PARTHIAN Art". Encyclopaedia Iranica, Vol. II, Fasc. 6. pp. 580–585.
- Arno Kose: Uruk: Architektur IV, Von der Seleukiden- bis zur Sasanidenzeit. Zabern, Mainz am Rhein 1998, ISBN 3-8053-1898-7, pp. 291–335
