= 110 BC =

110 BC in various calendars
- Gregorian calendar: 110 BC; CX BC
- Ab urbe condita: 644
- Ancient Egypt era: XXXIII dynasty, 214
- Pharaoh: Ptolemy IX Lathyros, 7
- Ancient Greek Olympiad (summer): 167th Olympiad, year 3
- Assyrian calendar: 4641
- Balinese saka calendar: N/A
- Bengali calendar: −703 – −702
- Berber calendar: 841
- Buddhist calendar: 435
- Burmese calendar: −747
- Byzantine calendar: 5399–5400
- Chinese calendar: 庚午年 (Metal Horse); 2588 or 2381 — to — 辛未年 (Metal Goat); 2589 or 2382
- Coptic calendar: −393 – −392
- Discordian calendar: 1057
- Ethiopian calendar: −117 – −116
- Hebrew calendar: 3651–3652
- Hindu calendars
- Vikram Samvat: −53 – −52
- Shaka Samvat: N/A
- Kali Yuga: 2991–2992
- Holocene calendar: 9891
- Iranian calendar: 731 BP – 730 BP
- Islamic calendar: 753 BH – 752 BH
- Javanese calendar: N/A
- Julian calendar: N/A
- Korean calendar: 2224
- Minguo calendar: 2021 before ROC 民前2021年
- Nanakshahi calendar: −1577
- Seleucid era: 202/203 AG
- Thai solar calendar: 433–434
- Tibetan calendar: ལྕགས་ཕོ་རྟ་ལོ་ (male Iron-Horse); 17 or −364 or −1136 — to — ལྕགས་མོ་ལུག་ལོ་ (female Iron-Sheep); 18 or −363 or −1135

Year 110 BC was a year of the pre-Julian Roman calendar. At the time it was known as the Year of the Consulship of Rufus and Albinus (or, less frequently, year 644 Ab urbe condita) and the First Year of Yuanfeng. The denomination 110 BC for this year has been used since the early medieval period, when the Anno Domini calendar era became the prevalent method in Europe for naming years.

== Events ==
=== By place ===
==== Roman Republic ====
- Jugurtha, king of Numidia, defeats a Roman army under Aulus Postumius Albinus.

==== Asia ====
- Han conquest of Dongyue

- In winter, the Han general Yang Pu retakes Wulin, and a faction of Dongyue nobles kill their king Zou Yushan before surrendering to the Han general Han Yue.
- Emperor Wu of Han annexes Dongyue and Minyue and relocates their population to the area between the Yangtze and Huai rivers.

== Births ==
- Asander, king of the Bosporan Kingdom (d. 17 BC)
- Hillel the Elder, Jewish religious leader (approximate date) (d. AD 10)
- Marcus Petreius, Roman general and politician (d. 46 BC)
- Titus Pomponius Atticus, Roman banker (d. 32 BC)

== Deaths ==
- Sima Tan, Chinese astrologist and historian
