= AD 110 =

110 in various calendars
- Gregorian calendar: 110; CX
- Ab urbe condita: 863
- Assyrian calendar: 4860
- Balinese saka calendar: 31–32
- Bengali calendar: −484 – −483
- Berber calendar: 1060
- Buddhist calendar: 654
- Burmese calendar: −528
- Byzantine calendar: 5618–5619
- Chinese calendar: 己酉年 (Earth Rooster); 2807 or 2600 — to — 庚戌年 (Metal Dog); 2808 or 2601
- Coptic calendar: −174 – −173
- Discordian calendar: 1276
- Ethiopian calendar: 102–103
- Hebrew calendar: 3870–3871
- Hindu calendars
- Vikram Samvat: 166–167
- Shaka Samvat: 31–32
- Kali Yuga: 3210–3211
- Holocene calendar: 10110
- Iranian calendar: 512 BP – 511 BP
- Islamic calendar: 528 BH – 527 BH
- Javanese calendar: N/A
- Julian calendar: 110; CX
- Korean calendar: 2443
- Minguo calendar: 1802 before ROC 民前1802年
- Nanakshahi calendar: −1358
- Seleucid era: 421/422 AG
- Thai solar calendar: 652–653
- Tibetan calendar: ས་མོ་བྱ་ལོ་ (female Earth-Bird); 236 or −145 or −917 — to — ལྕགས་ཕོ་ཁྱི་ལོ་ (male Iron-Dog); 237 or −144 or −916

Year 110 (CX) was a common year starting on Tuesday of the Julian calendar. In the Roman Empire, it was known as the Year of the Consulship of Priscinus and Scipio (or, less frequently, year 863 Ab urbe condita). The denomination 110 for this year has been used since the early medieval period, when the Anno Domini calendar era became the prevalent method in Europe for naming years.

== Events ==
=== By place ===
==== Roman Empire ====
- The Forum of Trajan is constructed in Rome, by the Syrian architect Apollodorus of Damascus.
- The Roman Empire has more than 75,000 kilometers (47,000 mi) of roads.

==== Asia ====
- Caravans make regular departures from Luoyang with Chinese ginger, cassia (a type of cinnamon), and silk to be bartered in Central Asia for gold, silver, glassware, pottery, cloth, and intaglio gems from Rome.

=== By topic ===
==== Art and science ====
- Suetonius, Roman historian, publishes Viris Illustribus ("On Famous Men" – in the field of literature).

== Births ==
- Hegesippus of Nazarene, Christian chronicler and writer (d. 180)
- Qiao Xuan (or Gongzu), Chinese official and chancellor (d. 184)

== Deaths ==
- Duan Xi, Chinese Protector General of the Western Regions
- Pacorus II, ruler (King of Kings ) of the Parthian Empire
