= List of United States Navy aircraft wings =

This is a list of United States Navy aircraft wings. The U.S. Navy first used the term "wing" in 1935 when patrol squadrons operating together in the same geographical area were for the first time loosely designated patrol wings, however these "wings" lacked any formal organization or headquarters staff. In 1937 the Navy's first wings were created when five Patrol Wings were formally established to exercise command of its patrol squadrons. A year later it organized the squadrons flying from the five aircraft carriers in commission at the time into Carrier Air Groups. Those Carrier Air Groups established in 1938 are the forerunners of today's Carrier Air Wings.

Today the U.S. Navy operates both Aircraft Carrier based Carrier Air Wings and land based Functional Wings and Type Wings. Carrier Air Wings are operational units made up of squadrons of different types of aircraft that deploy aboard aircraft carriers. The Navy's land based wings are organized either to perform a specific function (Functional Wings) or around a specific aircraft type (Type Wings). Patrol and Reconnaissance Wings, Test Wings and Training Wings are examples of functional wings, these wings may consist of a single type of aircraft or of a variety of types needed to perform a wing's specific function. Type Wings consist of squadrons of a single type of aircraft, they are non-deploying "force providers" that provide combat ready squadrons or detachments to deploying Carrier Air Wings or to other Navy or joint forces.

All Navy aircraft wings whether they are Carrier Air Wings or land based Type or Functional Wings are commanded by a Navy captain, however; in the case of a Training Air Wing or Naval Test Wing a U.S. Marine Corps colonel is sometimes assigned as commander as those wings conduct training or test and evaluation for both the U.S. Navy and the U.S. Marine Corps. Commanders of Carrier Air Wings are informally addressed as "CAG" which is a hold over of the original title from 1938 of "Carrier Air Group commander", and commanders of functional and type wings are addressed as "Commodore" which is a traditional Naval title for an officer exercising command over multiple units commanded by Commanding Officers (individual ships or aircraft squadrons).

== Current U S Navy air wings ==
The Navy currently operates nine Carrier Air Wings and twenty three land based Type Wings and Functional Wings.

=== Current Carrier air wings ===
The first of what would become today's Carrier Air Wings were formally established on 1 July 1938 when the position of Carrier Air Group Commander was created. Prior to that date squadrons which operated from an aircraft carrier were informally referred to as that ship's "air group" with usually the senior squadron commanding officer being responsible for the group as a whole. When a separate Air Group Commander position was created those informal air groups were formally established as the "name of ship" Air Group creating "Lexington Air Group" (USS Lexington (CV 2)), "Saratoga Air Group" (USS Saratoga (CV 3)), "Ranger Air Group" (USS Ranger (CV 4)), "Yorktown Air Group" (USS Yorktown (CV 5)) and "Enterprise Air Group" (USS Enterprise (CV 6)). Two of those Carrier Air Groups still exist today as Carrier Air Wing One and Carrier Air Wing Three.

On 20 December 1963 all carrier air groups which were then in existence were redesignated Carrier Air Wings (CVW). Of the nine current carrier air wings, two were established before WWII, four during WWII, two during the period of the Korean War and one during the period of the Vietnam War. The table below lists the nine currently active Carrier Air Wings.

A carrier air wing currently consists of eight squadrons and one detachment: Four Strike Fighter (VFA) squadrons totaling 44 aircraft, a mix of Boeing F/A-18E Super Hornet and F/A-18F Super Hornet squadrons with in some airwings, a Lockheed Martin F-35C Lightning II squadron which may be either a USN VFA squadron or a USMC Fighter Attack (VMFA) squadron in place of one of the Super Hornet squadrons; (Note: each CVW will ultimately consist of one F-35C squadron and three Super Hornet squadrons) one Electronic Attack (VAQ) squadron of seven Boeing EA-18G Growlers; one Airborne Command and Control (VAW) squadron of five Grumman E-2D Hawkeyes; one Helicopter Sea Combat (HSC) squadron of five Sikorksy MH-60S Seahawks; one Helicopter Maritime Strike (HSM) squadron of eleven MH-60R Seahawks; (Note: only five of the eleven MH-60R helicopters are typically embarked in the aircraft carrier with the squadron's other six aircraft embarked in detachments of two helicopters each aboard three of the Carrier Strike Group's escorting surface ships (Cruiser and/or Destroyers)) and one detachment of three Fleet Logistics Multi-Mission (VRM) squadron Bell-Boeing CMV-22B Osprey Carrier Onboard Delivery (COD) aircraft. In the near future a second detachment, a detachment of five Boeing MQ-25A Stingray aerial refueling drone tankers will be included in each Carrier Air Wing. (Note: The detachment will consist of five MQ-25 aircraft. The detachment will be attached to the wing's Airborne Command and Control (VAW) squadron with the detachment Officer-in-Charge reporting to the Commanding Officer of the VAW squadron rather than directly to the Airwing Commander)

Wing	Insignia	Operational Commander (Note: This table may be out of date with regard to Carrier Strike Group (CSG) assignment as CVWs are occasionally moved between CSGs to accommodate Aircraft Carrier maintenance schedules)	Administrative Commander	Lineage	Tail Code
CVW-1		Commander, Carrier Strike Group 8	Commander, Naval Air Force Atlantic	Ranger Air Group: 1 Jul 1938-3 Aug 1943 (Note: squadrons operating from USS Ranger (CV-4) had been informally called "Ranger Air Group" beginning 17 Aug 1934 but the air group was not established as a unit until 1 July 1938); CVG-4(1st): 3 Aug 1943-15 Nov 1946; CVAG-1: 15 Nov 1946-1 Sep 1948; CVG-1(2nd): 1 Sep 1948-20 Dec 1963; CVW-1: 20 Dec 1963–present	AB
CVW-2		Commander, Carrier Strike Group 1	Commander, Naval Air Force Pacific	CVBG-74: 1 May 1945-15 Nov 1946; CVBG-1: 15 Nov 1946- 1 Sep 1948; CVG-2(2nd): 1 Sep 1948-20 Dec 1963; CVW-2: 20 Dec 1963–present	NE
CVW-3		Commander, Carrier Strike Group 2	Commander, Naval Air Force Atlantic	Saratoga Air Group: 1 Jul 1938-25 Sep 1943 (Note: squadrons operating from USS Saratoga (CV-3) had been informally called "Saratoga Air Group" beginning 6 Jan 1928 but the air group was not established as a unit until 1 July 1938); CVG-3(1st): 25 Sep 1943-15 Nov 1946; CVAG-3: 15 Nov 1946-1 Sep 1948; CVG-3(2nd): 1 Sep 1948-20 Dec 1963; CVW-3: 20 Dec 1963–present	AC
CVW-5		Commander Carrier Strike Group 5	Commander, Naval Air Force Pacific	CVG-5(1st): 1 Jan 1943-15 Nov 1946; CVAG-5: 15 Nov 1946-1 Sep 1948; CVG-5(2nd): 1 Sep 1948-20 Dec 1963; CVW-5: 20 Dec 1963–present	NF
CVW-7		Commander, Carrier Strike Group 10	Commander Naval Air Force Atlantic	CVG-18: 2 Jul 1943-15 Nov 1946; CVAG-7: 15 Nov 1946-1 Sep 1948; CVG-7(2nd): 1 Sep 1948-20 Dec 1963; CVW-7: 20 Dec 1963–present	AG
CVW-8		Commander, Carrier Strike Group 12	Commander, Naval Air Force Atlantic	CVG-8(2nd): 9 Apr 1951-20 Dec 1963; CVW-8 20 Dec 1963–present	AJ
CVW-9		Commander, Carrier Strike Group 3	Commander, Naval Air Force Pacific	CVG-9 (3rd): 26 Mar 1952-20 Dec 1963; CVW-9: 20 Dec 1963–present	NG
CVW-11		Commander, Carrier Strike Group 9	Commander, Naval Air Force Pacific	CVG-11(1st): 10 Oct 1942-15 Nov 1946; CVAG-11: 15 Nov 1946-1 Sep 1948; CVG-11(2nd): 1 Sep 1948-20 Dec 1963; CVW-11: 20 Dec 1963–present	NH
CVW-17		Commander, Carrier Strike Group 11	Commander, Naval Air Force Pacific	CVW-17: 1 Nov 1966–present	1966: AA; 2012: NA (Note: established as an Atlantic Fleet air wing (AA) and transferred to the Pacific Fleet (NA) in 2012)

Note: The parenthetical (1st), (2nd), (3rd) appended to some Carrier Air Wing designations in the lineage column above are not a part of the Wings's designation. They are added to indicate that the designation was used more than once and to specify which use of the designation is indicated. There is not necessarily any lineage connection between Carrier Air Groups/Carrier Air Wings which shared the same designation.

Tail codes with a first letter "A" denote Atlantic Fleet airwings, while "N" denotes Pacific Fleet airwings.

=== Current Type Wings ===
In 1951 the first of what would come to be called a "type wing" was formed when Heavy Attack Wing ONE was established to provide specialized training for crews and ensure the upkeep of aircraft required for the safe and effective operation of the Navy's then new strategic nuclear bomber squadrons. The wing was not a deployable wing, instead it provided combat ready Heavy Attack (VAH) squadrons to deploying Carrier Air Groups. In the 1960s similar wings were established for the same purpose for the provision of the emerging technologies of airborne search radar and electronic warfare systems through the attachment of Carrier Airborne Early Warning (VAW) and Tactical Electronic Warfare (VAQ) squadrons to Carrier Air Wings. In the early 1970s the Atlantic Fleet created Type Wings for all of its carrier air wing type aircraft and in 1993 the Pacific Fleet followed suit.

Type Wings are non-deploying "force provider" wings which provide combat ready squadrons or detachments to Carrier Air Wings (CVW) or for land based or other shipboard (non-aircraft carrier) deployments. Type Wing squadrons which deploy as part of a Carrier Air Wing are based with their Type Wing when not deployed, not with their Carrier Air Wing. The exception are those squadrons assigned to the Carrier Air Wing which is forward deployed to Japan, those squadrons are based in Japan with their Carrier Air Wing, not with their Type Wings which are all based in the United States. Type Wings also operate their aircraft's Fleet Replacement Squadron.

Wing	Insignia	Reports to	Aircraft	Lineage	Squadrons (Homeport (Note: deployable squadrons) or based at (Note: non-deploying squadrons))	
Strike Fighter Wing Atlantic (SFWL) (Note: also: STRKFIGHTWINGLANT)		Commander, Naval Air Force Atlantic	F/A-18E; F/A-18F	LATWING 1: (Note: Lightg Attack Wing 1) 1 Jun 1970-1 Sep 1993; SFWL: 1 Sep 1993–present	Wing Commander & staff 14 CVW VFA Sqdns; 1 VFA FRS	(NAS Oceana, VA.) (NAS Oceana, VA.) (NAS Oceana, VA.)
Strike Fighter Wing Pacific (SFWP) (Note: also: STRKFIGHTWINGPAC)		Commander, Naval Air Force Pacific	F/A-18E; F/A-18F	LATWINGPAC: (Note: Light Attack Wing Pacific) 1 Jul 1973-5 Apr 1991; SFWP: 5 Apr 1991–present	Wing Commander & staff 13 CVW VFA Sqdns; 3 CVW VFA Sqdns; 1 VFA FRS	(NAS Lemoore, CA.) (NAS Lemoore, CA.) (MCAS Iwakuni, Japan) (NAS Lemoore, CA.)
Joint Strike Fighter Wing (JSFW) (Note: also: JSFWING)		Commander, Naval Air Force Pacific	F-35C	JSFW: 1 Oct 2018–present	Wing Commander & staff 3 CVW VFA Sqdns; 1 CVW VFA Sqdn; 1 VFA FRS	(NAS Lemoore, CA.) (NAS Lemoore, CA.) (MCAS Iwakuni, Japan) (NAS Lemoore, CA.)
Electronic Attack Wing Pacific (VAQWP) (Note: also: VAQWINGPAC and CVWP (Commander, VAQWINGPAC))		Commander, Naval Air Force Pacific	EA-18G	VAQWP: (Note: Electronic Combat Wing Pacific) 1 Feb 1993-30 Mar 1998; VAQWP: (Note: Electronic Attack Wing Pacific) 30 Mar 1998–present	Wing Commander & staff 8 CVW VAQ Sqdns; 1 CVW VAQ Sqdn; 5 Exped VAQ Sqdns (Note: VAQ "expeditionary" squadrons are land based squadrons which deploy to airfields ashore rather than as part of a Carrier Air Wing.); 1 VAQ FRS	(NAS Whidbey Is, WA.) (NAS Whidbey Is, WA.) (MCAS Iwakuni, Japan) (NAS Whidbey Is, WA.) (NAS Whidbey Is, WA.)
Airborne Command & Control and Logistics Wing (ACCLW) (Note: also: ACCLOGWING)		Commander, Naval Air Force Pacific	E-2D; MQ-25A (Note: Also included C-2A Greyhound until its retirement and final replacement in July 2026 by the CVM-22Bs of Fleet Logistics Multi-Mission Wing)	AEWWINGPAC: (Note: Airborne Early Warning Wing Pacific) 1 Aug 1993-23 Sep 2005; ACCLW: 23 Sep 2005–present	Wing Commander & staff 4 CVW VAW Sqdns; 4 CVW VAW Sqdns; 1 CVW VAW Sqdn; 1 VAW FRS; 1 VUQ Sqdn (Note: The first of two operational MQ-25 squadrons (VUQ-11) was established on 1 April 2026 at NAS Patuxent River, it will relocate to NBVC Point Mugu by the end of 2026); 1 VUQ FRS (Note: VUQ-10 established on 1 October 2022 at NAS Patuxent River. It is currently engaged with VX-23, UX-24 and VX-1 to test, train and develop operational and maintenance procedures for the MQ-25 Stingray. It will ultimately move to NBVC Pt. Mugu as the MQ-25 FRS)	(NBVC Pt Mugu, CA.) (NBVC Pt Mugu, CA.) (NS Norfolk, VA.) (MCAS Iwakuni, Japan) (NS Norfolk, VA.) (NAS Patuxent River, MD.) (NAS Patuxent River, MD.)
Fleet Logistics Multi-Mission Wing (VRMW) (Note: also: VRMWING)	VRM-Wing	Commander, Naval Air Force Pacific	CMV-22B	VRMW: 1 Oct 2019–present	Wing Commander & staff 1 VRM Sqdn (Note: Provides detachments to Pacific Fleet CVWs); 1 VRM Sqdn (Note: Provides detachments to Atlantic Fleet CVWs); 1 VRM FRS	(NAS North Is, CA.) (NAS North Is, CA.) (Note: with one permanently forward deployed detachment with CVW-5 at MCAS Iwakuni, Japan) (NS Norfolk, VA.) (NAS North Is, CA.)
Helicopter Sea Combat Wing Atlantic (HSCWL) (Note: also: HELSEACOMBATWINGLANT and informally, HSCWINGLANT)		Commander, Naval Air Force Atlantic	MH-60S; MH-53E (Note: planned retirement in 2027)	HELTACWING 1: (Note: Helicopter Tactical Wing ONE) 1 Oct 1982-1 Sep 1993; HELTACWINGLANT: (Note: Helicopter Tactical Wing Atlantic) 1 Sep 1993-1 Apr 2005; HSCWL: 1 Apr 2005–present	Wing Commander & staff 4 CVW HSC Sqdns; 3 Exped HSC Sqdns (Note: HSC and HSM "expeditionary" squadrons are non-deploying land based squadrons which provide deployable detachments to ships other than aircraft carriers); 1 HSC FRS; 1 HM Sqdn; 1 Station SAR unit (Note: Search and Rescue unit of three to four helicopters to support aviation activities at that Naval Air Station)	(NS Norfolk, VA.) (NS Norfolk, VA.) (NS Norfolk, VA.) (Note: Two of the squadrons maintain one permanently forward deployed detachment each; one at NSA Bahrain and one at NAS Sigonella) (NS Norfolk, VA.) (NS Norfolk, VA.) (Note: Two former detachments; one in Pohang, Korea inherited from HM-14 when HM-14 deactivated in 2023, which was then deactivated in late 2025, and a detachment at NSA Bahrain which was shut down in August 2025. Both were shut down as part of the ongoing MH-53E divestment) (NAS Key West, FL.)
Helicopter Sea Combat Wing Pacific (HSCWP) (Note: also: HELSEACOMBATWINGPAC and informally, HSCWINGPAC)		Commander, Naval Air Force Pacific	MH-60S	HELTACWINGPAC: (Note: Helicopter Tactical Wing Pacific) 1 Jul 1993-1 Apr 2005; HSCWP: 1 Apr 2005–present	Wing Commander & staff 4 CVW HSC Sqdns; 1 CVW HSC Sqdn; 2 Exped HSC Sqdns; 1 Exped HSC Sqdn; 1 HSC FRS; 1 Station SAR unit 1 Station SAR unit	(NAS North Is, CA.) (NAS North Is, CA.) (NAF Atsugi, Japan) (NAS North Is, CA.) (Anderson AFB, Guam) (Note: One permanently forward deployed detachment at NAF Atsugi) (NAS North Is, CA.) (NAS Lemoore, CA.) (NAS Whidbey Is, WA.)
Helicopter Maritime Strike Wing Atlantic (HSMWL) (Note: also: HELMARSTRIKEWINGLANT and informally, HSMWINGLANT)		Commander, Naval Air Force Atlantic	MH-60R	HELSEACONWING 3: (Note: Helicopter Sea Control Wing THREE) Mar 1985-2 Jul 1992; HSLWING 1: (Note: Helicopter Anti-Submarine (Light) Wing ONE) 1 Jul 1992-1 Sep 1993; HSLWINGLANT: (Note: Helicopter Anti-Submarine (Light) Wing Atlantic) 1 Sep 1993-1 Jul 2006; HSMWL: 1 Jul 2006–present	Wing Commander & staff 4 CVW HSM Sqdns; 2 Exped HSM Sqdns; 1 Exped HSM Sqdn; 1 HSM FRS	(NS Mayport, FL.) (NAS Jacksonville, FL.) (NS Mayport, FL.) (NS Rota, Spain) (NS Mayport, FL.)
Helicopter Maritime Strike Wing Pacific (HSMWP) (Note: also: HELMARSTRIKEWINGPAC and informally, HSMWINGPAC)		Commander, Naval Air Force Pacific	MH-60R	HSLWINGPAC: (Note: Helicopter Antisubmarine (Light) Wing Pacific) 5 May 1993-1 Nov 2004; HSMWP: 1 Nov 2004–present	Wing Commander & staff 4 CVW HSM Sqdns; 1 CVW HSM Sqdn; 1 Exped HSM Sqdn; 1 Exped HSM Sqdn; 2 Exped HSM Sqdns; 1 HSM FRS	(NAS North Is, CA.) (NAS North Is, CA.) (NAF Atsugi, Japan) (NAF Atsugi, Japan) (MCAS Kaneohe Bay, HI.) (NAS North Is, CA.) (NAS North Is, CA.)

With one exception there are no type wing Tail Codes. Type wing squadrons which are also carrier air wing squadrons are marked with the tail code of their carrier air wing. Expeditionary squadrons and Fleet Replacement Squadrons (Note: The fixed wing FRSs all carry tail codes which belonged to one of two "Readiness Carrier Air Wings" (RCVW) which before June 1970 were training wings made up of FRSs. Those wings were disestablished in June 1970 and each FRS was reassigned to what became today's type wings each retaining it's old RCVW tail code) are marked with squadron unique codes. The single exception is Electronic Attack Wing Pacific (VAQWP) with tail code NL for its expeditionary squadrons. (Note: When CVW-15 was disestablished in 1995 its VAQ squadron rather than being disestablished with the wing was instead re-purposed as the first expeditionary squadron. The CVW-15 tail code "NL" remained painted on the squadron's aircraft and from that point forward each new expeditionary squadron has been marked with that tail code)

=== Current Functional Wings ===
In 1937 the first of what would come to be known as functional wings were created when five Patrol Wings were established to exercise command of the Navy's then existing non-ship based patrol squadrons. From that time to the present, land based aircraft wings have been established as a means of commanding aircraft squadrons functioning in various combat or support roles. Functional Wings today are made up of squadrons of land based aircraft and may be made up of squadrons of a single type of aircraft or of squadrons of different types of aircraft depending on what is needed to carry out the function of the wing. There are currently thirteen wings falling under the command of the Naval Air Force Reserve; the Naval Air Warfare Center Aircraft or Weapons divisions; U.S. Strategic Command; Patrol and Reconnaissance Group; or the Naval Air Training Command fulfilling various functions.

There are three U.S Navy Reserve Wings under the command of the Commander, Naval Air Force Reserve. Tactical Support Wing provides 100% of the Navy's dedicated "Aggressor" squadrons (Note: Aggressor services for the Navy Fighter Weapons School (TOPGUN) are provided by the school's F/A-18E and F and F-16A and B aircraft flown by TOPGUN aggressor pilots not by the VFC squadrons) and it provides one Expeditionary Electronic Attack (VAQ) squadron. Fleet Logistics Support Wing provides 100% of the Navy's "Navy Unique Fleet Essential Airlift" (NUFEA) aircraft providing worldwide logistics support to operating forces. Maritime Support Wing maintains two Patrol (VP) squadrons and two expeditionary Helicopter Maritime Strike (HSM) squadrons for tasking as required.

Wing	Insignia	Aircraft	Lineage	Squadrons (Homeport or based at)		Tail Code
Tactical Support Wing (TSW)		F/A-18E, F F-5F, N F-16C, D EA-18G	CVWR-20: 1 Apr 1970-1 Apr 2007; TSW: 1 Apr 2007–present	Wing Commander & staff 1 VFC Sqdn; F/A-18; 1 VFC Sqdn; F-16; 1 VFC Sqdn; F-5; 1 VFC Sqdn; F-5; 1 Exped VAQ Sqdn (Note: VAQ "expeditionary" squadrons are land based squadrons which deploy to airfields ashore rather than as part of a Carrier Air Wing.)	(NAS JRB Fort Worth, TX.) (NAS Oceana, VA.) (NAS Fallon, NV.) (NAS Key West, FL.) (NAS JRB New Orleans, LA.) (NAS Whidbey Island, WA.)	AF (Note: Retains tail code AF from its former existence as Reserve Carrier Air Wing TWENTY (CVWR-20))
Fleet Logistics Support Wing (FLSW)		C-40A; C-130T; KC-130T; C-37A; C-37B	Reserve Tactical Support Wing: 1974–1983; FLSW: 1983-present	Wing Commander & staff 1 ETD; (Note: Executive Transport Detachment) C-37A; 2 VR Sqdns; C-37B, C-130; 2 VR Sqdns; C-40, C-130; 1 VR Sqdn; C-130; 1 VR Sqdn; C-130; 1 VR Sqdn; C-130; 1 VR Sqdn; C-40; 1 VR Sqdn; C-40; 1 VR Sqdn; C-40; 1 VR Sqdn; C-40; 1 VR Sqdn; C-40	(NAS JRB Fort Worth, TX.) (JB Pearl Harbor-Hickam, HI.) (JB Andrews, MD.) (NAS Jacksonville, FL.) (NBVC Point Mugu, CA.) (JB McGuire-Dix-Lakehurst, NJ.) (NAS JRB New Orleans, LA.) (NAS JRB Fort Worth, TX.) (MCAS Kaneohe Bay, HI.) (NAS Oceana, VA.) (NAS North Island, CA.) (NAS Whidbey Island, WA.)	
Maritime Support Wing (MSW)		P-8A; MH-60R	MSW: 31 July 2015 – present	Wing Commander & staff 1 VP Sqdn; 1 VP Sqdn; 1 Exped HSM Sqdn (Note: When it was established the wing also included two expeditionary Helicopter Sea Combat Squadrons (HSC) which were disestablished in 2016 and 2023); 1 Exped HSM Sqdn	(NAS North Island, CA.) (NAS Whidbey Island, WA.) (NAS Jacksonville, FL.) (NAS Jacksonville, FL.) (NAS North Island, CA.)	

Naval Test Wings Atlantic (NTWL) and Pacific (NTWP) are Developmental Test and Evaluation (DT&E) wings. NTWL is the operational component of the Naval Air Warfare Center Aircraft Division, it is responsible for DT&E of Navy and Marine Corps aircraft and it operates the United States Naval Test Pilot School. NTWP is the operational component of the Naval Air Warfare Center Weapons Division, it is responsible for DT&E of Navy and Marine Corps airborne systems and weapons. Note: Operational Test and Evaluation (OT&E) of USN and USMC aircraft and airborne weapons is conducted by the U.S. Navy Operational Test and Evaluation Force, Aviation Warfare Division, not by NTWL or NTWP.

Wing	Insignia	Aircraft	Lineage	Squadrons (based at)	
Naval Test Wing Atlantic (NTWL)		Various	NTWL: 1995–present	Wing Commander & staff USNTPS; 4 DT&E Sqdns	(NAS Patuxent River, MD.) (NAS Patuxent River, MD.) (NAS Patuxent River, MD.)
Naval Test Wing Pacific (NTWP)		Various	NTWP: 8 May 1995 – present	Wing Commander & staff 1 DT&E Sqdn; 1 DT&E/Range support Sqdn	(NBVC Point Mugu, CA.) (NAWS China Lake, CA.) (NBVC Point Mugu, CA.)

Strategic Communications Wing ONE reports administratively to Commander, Naval Air Force Pacific. Operationally it is designated United States Strategic Command Task Force 124 and operates airborne command and control aircraft for the relay of strategic communications to the nation's Intercontinental ballistic missile and Submarine-launched ballistic missile forces.

Wing	Insignia	Aircraft	Lineage	Squadrons, based at
STRATCOMWING; ONE		E-6B	STRATCOMWING ONE: 1 May 1992 – present	The wing consists of two operational Fleet Air Reconnaissance (VQ) squadrons and one Fleet Replacement Squadron all based at Tinker AFB, OK. Permanent detachment sites are maintained at Travis AFB, CA., Offutt AFB, NE. and NAS Patuxent River, MD.

Patrol and Reconnaissance Wings TEN and ELEVEN report to Commander, Patrol and Reconnaissance Group who in turn reports to Commander, Naval Air Force Atlantic. (Note: Commander Patrol and Reconnaissance Group is "dual hatted" as Commander, Patrol and Reconnaissance Group Pacific reporting to Commander, Naval Air Force Pacific under that hat) The P-8A/MQ-4C Fleet Replacement Squadron also reports directly to Commander, Patrol and Reconnaissance Group.

Wing	Insignia	Aircraft	Lineage	Squadrons, homeported or based at
PATRECONWING; TEN		P-8A	PATWING TEN(2nd): 1 Jun 1981-1 Jun 1999; PATRECONWING TEN: 1 Jun 1999–present	The wing consists of six Patrol (VP) squadrons and one Unmanned Patrol (VUP) squadron. (Note: From VUP-11 official command website as of June 2025: "Officially established on October 1, 2024, VUP-11 is undergoing rapid growth as it progresses through a multi-year standup period. A formal establishment ceremony is scheduled for late 2025, followed by commencement of initial flight operations. The squadron is on track to assume full flight operations at NAS Whidbey Island by 2027 and full maintenance operations at NBVC Point Mugu by 2029.") The wing and its squadrons are all homeported or based at NAS Whidbey Island, WA. (Note: The VUP squadron command and control center from where the aircraft will be flown is at NAS Whidbey Island but its aircraft will be based at Naval Base Ventura County, Point Mugu or will be forward deployed to operating locations)
PATRECONWING; ELEVEN		P-8A; MQ-4C	PATWING ELEVEN(1st): 15 Aug 1942-1 Nov 1942; FAW (Note: FAW: Fleet Air Wing) ELEVEN: 1 Nov 1942-30 Jun 1973; PATWING ELEVEN(2nd): 30 Jun 1973-26 Mar 1999; PATRECONWING ELEVEN: 26 Mar 1999–present	The wing consists of six Patrol (VP) squadrons, one Special Projects Patrol (VPU) squadron and one Unmanned Patrol (VUP) squadron. The wing and its squadrons are all homeported or based at NAS Jacksonville, FL. (Note: The VUP squadron command and control center from where the aircraft are flown is at NAS Jacksonville but its aircraft are based at Naval Station Mayport or are forward deployed to operating locations)

Note: The parenthetical (1st) or (2nd) appended to the PATWING designations in the lineage column above are not a part of the Wing's designation. They are added to indicate that the designation was used more than once and to specify which use of the designation is indicated. There is not necessarily any lineage connection between wings which shared the same designation.

Training Air Wings fall under the command of the Chief of Naval Air Training (CNATRA) who is the Commander, Naval Air Training Command. They train either Student Naval Aviators (SNA) of the U. S. Navy, U. S. Marine Corps and U. S. Coast Guard or they train U. S. Navy Student Naval Flight Officers (SNFO) and unmanned aircraft pilots (Note: A Navy Air Vehicle Pilot (AVP) is a U S Navy Warrant Officer qualified to operate the MQ-25A remotely piloted aircraft carrier based aircraft while USCG Aerial Vehicle Pilots (AVP) and USMC Unmanned Aircraft Systems Officers (UASO) are Commissioned Officers qualified to operate the MQ-9. USN AVPs, USCG AVPs and USMC UASOs wear the same wings.) of the U. S. Navy, U.S. Marine Corps and U. S. Coast Guard. They also provide training for foreign military student aviators under the Foreign Military Sales program.

Wing	Insignia	Aircraft	Lineage	Squadrons, based at	Tail Code
TRAWING ONE		T-45C	TW-1: 1 Aug 1971–present	Two SNA advanced jet training squadrons based at NAS Meridian, MS.	A
TRAWING TWO		T-45C	TW-2: 1 Aug 1971–present	Two SNA advanced jet training squadrons based at NAS Kingsville, TX.	B
TRAWING FOUR		T-6B; T-44C; T-54A (Note: Replacing T-44C beginning 2024 through 2027)	TW-4: March 1972–present	Two SNA primary training squadrons and two SNA advanced multi-engine training squadrons based at NAS Corpus Christi, TX.	G
TRAWING FIVE		T-6B; TH-73A	TW-5: 9 Jan 1972–present (Note: established to control training activities at NAS Whiting Field and NAS Ellyson Field, FL (training operations ceased at Ellyson Field in Dec 1973))	Three SNA primary training squadrons and three SNA advanced helicopter training squadrons based at NAS Whiting Field, FL.	E
TRAWING SIX		T-6A; T-45C (Note: All SNFOs receive primary training in the T-6A. SNFOs destined to fly the F/A-18F or EA-18G receive advanced training in the T-45C. SNFOs destined to fly the E-2D, P-8A or E-6B receive advanced training in a "mulit-crew simulator". Student unmanned aircraft pilots receive primary training in the T-6A simulator and advanced training in a simulator designed for the purpose)	TW-6: 1 Feb 1972–present	One SNFO and student AVP/UASO primary training squadron, one SNFO (Note: graduates fly F/A-18F and EA-18G) and student AVP/UASO (Note: graduates fly: USN MQ-25; USMC and USCG MQ-9) advanced training squadron, and one SNFO advanced training squadron. (Note: graduates fly E-6, P-8 and E-2) All based at NAS Pensacola, FL.	F

== Disestablished Navy Air Wings ==
The tables below list wings which have been disestablished. Included in the tables are no longer used former designations of both disestablished and current wings.

=== Disestablished Carrier Air Groups/Carrier Air Wings 1938 to present ===
On 1 July 1938 the first five Carrier Air Groups were established. They were the Lexington Air Group, the Saratoga Air Group, the Ranger Air Group, the Yorktown Air Group and the Enterprise Air Group (aircraft had operated from the Navy's first aircraft carrier, USS Langley from January 1923 to June 1936 but in October 1936 she was converted to a seaplane tender). Between 1 March 1942 and the end of World War II approximately 88 more airwings were established. To the present day there have been a total of 133 Carrier Air Groups (called Carrier Air Wings since 20 December 1963) established, only nine of which still exist as Carrier Air Wings. A tenth wing still exists as the U.S. Navy Reserve's Tactical Support Wing which is now a land based functional wing.

During the course of a single Carrier Air Group/Carrier Air Wing's existence it may have been identified by more than one designation. The inverse is also true in that a single designation (such as CVG-15) could have been used for multiple different Carrier Air Groups/Carrier Air Wings over time. For example, there were three carrier air groups which were designated CVG-15 at some point in each of their existence and none of those three groups were related to each other. The first was a Second World War group which existed as CVG-15 from 1 September 1942 to 30 October 1945. The second was a Carrier Air Group which was established in 1945 as CVG-153, it was redesignated CVAG-15 on 15 November 1946, then again redesignated as CVG-15 on 1 September 1948 and disestablished on 1 December 1949. The third was established as CVG-15 on 5 April 1951, redesignated CVW-15 on 20 December 1963 and disestablished on 31 March 1995. The lineage of a Carrier Air Group/Carrier Air Wing does not follow the designation, it follows the Group/Wing regardless of the designation.

Of the 133 Carrier Air Groups/Carrier Air Wings, Air Task Groups and Antisubmarine Carrier Air Groups which have ever existed, 100 have been identified by a single designation, 17 have been identified by two designations, seven by three designations, six by four designations and three by five designations.

The parenthetical (1st), (2nd), (3rd), etc... appended to some Carrier Air Group/Carrier Air Wing designations in the tables which follow are not a part of the group's or wings's designation. They are added in this article to indicate that the designation was used more than once and to specify which use of the designation is indicated. Absence indicates that the designation was the sole use of that designation. There is not necessarily any lineage connection between Carrier Air Groups/Carrier Air Wings which shared the same designation.

==== Carrier Air Groups (Ship Named Groups, CVG, CVLG, CVEG, CVAG, CVBG) / Carrier Air Wings (CVW) 1938 to present ====
This section contains tables of disestablished Carrier Air Groups (Ship Named Groups, CVG, CVLG, CVEG, CVAG, CVBG) / Carrier Air Wings (CVW). On 20 December 1963 all Carrier Air Groups which were then still in existence were redesignated Carrier Air Wings. The tables which follow are arranged by time periods using the designation scheme which was in use during that time period. Because of this, most of the carrier air groups/carrier air wings which carried more than a single designation appear in multiple tables below.

===== Ship named Carrier Air Groups 1938 to 1943 =====
Aircraft squadrons operating from the Navy's first Aircraft Carriers prior to WWII were assigned to that aircraft carrier and were organizationally grouped into that carrier's "air group". On 1 July 1938 the "Carrier Air Group" was formally established as a separate unit and the previously informally named air groups were titled "name of ship Air Group". Air Groups were permanently assigned to a specific Aircraft Carrier and carried that Aircraft Carrier's name (Lexington Air Group, Saratoga Air Group etc...)

Group	Lineage	Notes
Langley Air Group		Squadrons operating from USS Langley (CV-1) from Jan 1923 to June 1936 informally called "Langley Air Group". In 1936 Langley was converted to a Seaplane Tender.
Lexington Air Group	Lexington Air Group: 1 Jul 1938-8 May 1942	Squadrons operating from USS Lexington (CV-2) beginning Aug 1927 informally called "Lexington Air Group" but a permanent group of squadrons was not assigned until 1 July 1937. Lexington Air Group officially established 1 Jul 1938, disestablished after the 8 May 1942 loss of USS Lexington in the Battle of the Coral Sea.
Saratoga Air Group	Saratoga Air Group: 1 Jul 1938-25 Sep 1943; CVG-3(1st): 25 Sep 1943-15 Nov 1946; CVAG-3: 15 Nov 1946-1 Sep 1948; CVG-3(2nd): 1 Sep 1948-20 Dec 1963; CVW-3: 20 Dec 1963–present	Squadrons operating from USS Saratoga (CV-3) had been informally called "Saratoga Air Group" beginning 6 Jan 1928 but a permanent group of squadrons was not assigned until 1 July 1937. Saratoga Air Group officially established 1 July 1938. Still active. see CVW-3 in the "Current Carrier Air Wings" section.
Ranger Air Group	Ranger Air Group: 1 Jul 1938-3 Aug 1943; CVG-4(1st): 3 Aug 1943-15 Nov 1946; CVAG-1: 15 Nov 1946-1 Sep 1948; CVG-1(2nd): 1 Sep 1948-20 Dec 1963; CVW-1: 20 Dec 1963–present	Squadrons operating from USS Ranger (CV-4) had been informally called "Ranger Air Group" beginning 17 Aug 1934 but a permanent group of squadrons was not assigned until 1 July 1937. Ranger Air Group officially established 1 July 1938. Still active, see CVW-1 in the "Current Carrier Air Wings" section.
Yorktown Air Group	Yorktown Air Group: 1 Jul 1938-1942	Squadrons operating from USS Yorktown (CV-5) from Jan 1938 informally called "Yorktown Air Group". Yorktown Air Group officially established 1 July 1938, disestablished after the 7 Jun 1942 loss of USS Yorktown in the Battle of Midway.
Enterprise Air Group	Enterprise Air Group: 1 Jul 1938-1 Sep 1942	Established 1 July 1938 for USS Enterprise (CV-6) which was commissioned 12 May 1938, disestablished 1 Sep 1942 after USS Enterprise was damaged during the Battle of the Eastern Solomons necessitating extensive repairs at Pearl Harbor naval shipyard.
Wasp Air Group	Wasp Air group: 1 Jul 1939-1942	Established for USS Wasp (CV-7) which was launched 4 April 1939, disestablished after the 15 Sep 1942 loss of USS Wasp during the Guadalcanal campaign.
Hornet Air Group	Hornet Air Group: 20 Oct 1941-1942	Established for USS Hornet (CV-8) which was commissioned 20 October 1941, disestablished after the 26 Oct 1942 loss of USS Hornet in the Battle of the Santa Cruz Islands.

===== Carrier Air Groups 1 March 1942 to 15 November 1946 =====
In 1942 in anticipation of the coming massive build up of aircraft carriers and carrier air groups a new Carrier Air Group designation scheme was created which divorced carrier air group names from specific aircraft carriers. Instead, air groups were given the designation "CVG" meaning "Carrier Air Group" followed by a number. All newly establishing carrier air groups were designated under this system. The first Carrier Air Group designated using this scheme was CVG-9 on 1 March 1942. In 1943 the two remaining ship named air groups, the Saratoga Air Group and Ranger Air Group were redesignated CVG-3 and CVG-4 respectively.

Fleet Carrier Air Groups (CVG, CVBG) 1 Mar 1942 to 15 Nov 1946. Carrier Air Groups (CVG)s embarked aboard Fleet Carriers of the USS Essex class and aboard the three remaining pre-WWII Fleet Carriers; USS Saratoga (CV-3), USS Ranger (CV-4) and USS Enterprise (CV-6). CVGs consisted of four squadrons each: One Fighting (VF) squadron, one Bombing (VB) squadron, one Scouting (VS) squadron and one Torpedo (VT) squadron. (Note: except for CVG-4 aboard USS Ranger (CV 4) which had no VT squadron as Ranger being smaller than the other fleet carriers was constructed without space for torpedo storage) Each was designated with the CVG number meaning that CVG-17 consisted of VF-17, VB-17, VS-17 and VT-17. By 1945 the composition changed to add a second fighting squadron which was designated a Bombing Fighting (VBF) squadron in place of the Scouting (VS) squadron. In the last months of the war two air groups were established to operate from the new large USS Midway class carriers which were about to join the fleet, these air groups were identified with a "B" between the V and G (CVBG). The war ended before any of the Midway class carriers were commissioned. A third CVBG was created by redesignating a CVG a few months after the end of the war to make three CVBGs for the three Midway class aircraft carriers.

Group	Lineage	Notes
CVG-1(1st)	CVG-1(1st): 1 May 1943-25 Oct 1945	
CVG-2(1st)	CVG-2(1st): 1 Jun 1943-9 Nov 1945	
CVG-3(1st)	Saratoga Air Group: 1 Jul 1938-25 Sep 1943; CVG-3(1st): 25 Sep 1943-15 Nov 1946; CVAG-3: 15 Nov 1946-1 Sep 1948; CVG-3(2nd): 1 Sep 1948-20 Dec 1963; CVW-3: 20 Dec 1963–present	This air group is one of only fourteen air groups (CVG or CVBG) which was not disestablished during the war or the post war drawdown. It is still active; see CVW-3 in the "Current Carrier Air Wings" section.
CVG-4(1st)	Ranger Air Group: 1 Jul 1938-3 Aug 1943; CVG-4(1st): 3 Aug 1943-15 Nov 1946; CVAG-1: 15 Nov 1946-1 Sep 1948; CVG-1(2nd): 1 Sep 1948-20 Dec 1963; CVW-1: 20 Dec 1963–present	This air group is one of only fourteen air groups (CVG or CVBG) which was not disestablished during the war or the post war drawdown. It is still active; see CVW-1 in the "Current Carrier Air Wings" section.
CVG-5(1st)	CVG-5(1st): 1 Jan 1943-15 Nov 1946; CVAG-5: 15 Nov 1946-1 Sep 1948; CVG-5(2nd): 1 Sep 1948-20 Dec 1963; CVW-5: 20 Dec 1963–present	This air group is one of only fourteen air groups (CVG or CVBG) which was not disestablished during the war or the post war drawdown. It is still active; see CVW-5 in the "Current Carrier Air Wings" section.
CVG-6(1st)	CVG-6(1st): 15 Mar 1943-29 Oct 1945	
CVG-7(1st)	CVG-7(1st): 3 Jan 1944-8 Jul 1946	
CVG-8(1st)	CVG-8(1st): 1 Jun 1943-23 Nov 1945	
CVG-9(1st)	CVG-9(1st): 1 Mar 1942-15 Oct 1945	
CVG-10(1st)	CVG-10(1st): 16 April 1942-16 Nov 1945	The history of this group is covered in works by Samuel Elliott Morison, Lundstrom, Hammel, and books on the Battle of Santa Cruz Islands or the Battle of Philippine Sea. VF-10 "Grim Reapers," VB-10, and Torpedo Squadron 10 (VT-10) flew with the group throughout its existence.
CVG-11(1st)	CVG-11(1st): 10 Oct 1942-15 Nov 1946; CVAG-11: 15 Nov 1946-1 Sep 1948; CVG-11(2nd): 1 Sep 1948-20 Dec 1963; CVW-11: 20 Dec 1963–present	This air group is one of only fourteen air groups (CVG or CVBG) which was not disestablished during the war or the post war drawdown. It is still active; see CVW-11 in the "Current Carrier Air Wings" section.
CVG-12(1st)	CVG-12(1st): 9 Jan 1943-17 Sep 1945	
CVG-13(1st)	CVG-13(1st): 2 Nov 1943-20 Oct 1945	
CVG-14(1st)	CVG-14(1st): 1 Sep 1943-14 Jun 1945	
CVG-15(1st)	CVG-15(1st): 1 Sep 1942-30 Oct 1945	
CVG-16(1st)	CVG-16(1st): 16 Nov 1942-6 Nov 1945	
CVG-17(1st) CVBG-17	CVG-17(1st): 1 Jan 1943-23 Jan 1946; CVBG-17: 23 Jan 1946-15 Nov 1946; CVBG-5: 15 Nov 1946-1 Sep 1948; CVG-6(2nd): 1 Sep 1946-20 Dec 1963; CVW-6: 20 Dec 1963-1 Apr 1993	This air group is one of only fourteen air groups (CVG or CVBG) which was not disestablished during the war or the post war drawdown. It was redesignated a CVBG after the end of the war in January 1946 for assignment to one of the three USS Midway class aircraft carriers USS Midway (CV-41), USS Franklin D. Roosevelt (CV-42) and USS Coral Sea (CV-43)
CVG-18	CVG-18: 2 Jul 1943-15 Nov 1946; CVAG-7: 15 Nov 1946-1 Sep 1948; CVG-7(2nd): 1 Sep 1948-20 Dec 1963; CVW-7: 20 Dec 1963–present	This air group is one of only fourteen air groups (CVG or CVBG) which was not disestablished during the war or the post war drawdown. It is still active; see CVW-7 in the "Current Carrier Air Wings" section.
CVG-19(1st)	CVG-19(1st): 1 Aug 1943-15 Nov 1946; CVAG-19: 15 Nov 1946-1 Sep 1948; CVG-19(2nd): 1 Sep 1948-20 Dec 1963; CVW-19: 20 Dec 1963-30 June 1977	This air group is one of only fourteen air groups (CVG or CVBG) which was not disestablished during the war or the post war drawdown.
CVG-20	CVG-20: 15 Oct 1943-15 Nov 1946; CVAG-9: 15 Nov 1946-1 Sep 1948; CVG-9(2nd): 1 Sep 1948-1 Dec 1949	This air group is one of only fourteen air groups (CVG or CVBG) which was not disestablished during the war or the post war drawdown.
CVBG-74	CVBG-74: 1 May 1945-15 Nov 1946; CVBG-1: 15 Nov 1946-1 Sep 1948; CVG-2(2nd): 1 Sep 1948-20 Dec 1963; CVW-2: 20 Dec 1963–present	Established for assignment to one of the three USS Midway class aircraft carriers USS Midway (CV-41), USS Franklin D. Roosevelt (CV-42) and USS Coral Sea (CV-43). This air group is one of only fourteen air groups (CVG or CVBG) which was not disestablished during the war or the post war drawdown. It is still active; see CVW-2 in the "Current Carrier Air Wings" section.
CVBG-75	CVBG-75: 1 Jun 1945-15 Nov 1946; CVBG-3: 15 Nov 1946-1 Sep 1948; CVG-4(2nd): 1 Sep 1948-8 Jun 1950	Established for assignment to one of the three USS Midway class aircraft carriers USS Midway (CV-41), USS Franklin D. Roosevelt (CV-42) and USS Coral Sea (CV-43). This air group is one of only fourteen air groups (CVG or CVBG) which was not disestablished during the war or the post war drawdown.
CVG-80	CVG-80: 1 Feb 1944-16 Sep 1946	
CVG-81	CVG-81: 1 Mar 1944-15 Nov 1946; CVAG-13: 15 Nov 1946-1 Sep 1948; CVG-13(2nd): 1 Sep 1948-30 Nov 1949	This air group is one of only fourteen air groups (CVG or CVBG) which was not disestablished during the war or the post war drawdown.
CVG-82	CVG-82: 1 Apr 1944-15 Nov 1946; CVAG-17: 15 Nov 1946-1 Sep 1948; CVG-17(2nd): 1 Sep 1948-15 Sep 1958	This air group is one of only fourteen air groups (CVG or CVBG) which was not disestablished during the war or the post war drawdown.
CVG-83	CVG-83: 1 May 1944-24 Sep 1945	
CVG-84	CVG-84: 1 May 1944-8 Oct 1945	
CVG-85	CVG-85: 15 May 1944-27 Sep 1945	
CVG-86	CVG-86: 15 Jun 1944-21 Nov 1945	
CVG-87	CVG-87: 1 Jul 1944-2 Nov 1945	
CVG-88	CVG-88: 18 Aug 1944-29 Oct 1945	
CVG-89	CVG-89: 2 Oct 1944-27 Apr 1946	
CVG-92	CVG-92: 2 Dec 1944-18 Dec 1946	
CVG-93	CVG-93: 21 Dec 1944-30 Apr 1946	
CVG-94	CVG-94: 15 Nov 1944-7 Nov 1945	
CVG-95	CVG-95: 2 Jan 1945-31 Oct 1945	
CVG-97	CVG-97: 1 Nov 1944-31 Mar 1946	
CVG-98	CVG-98: 28 Aug 1944-15 Nov 1946; CVAG-21: 15 Nov 1946-5 Aug 1947	This air group is one of only fourteen air groups (CVG or CVBG) which was not disestablished during the war or the post war drawdown.
CVG-99	CVG-99: 15 Jul 1944-8 Sep 1945	
CVG-100	CVG-100: 1 Apr 1944-20 Feb 1946	
CVG-150	CVG-150: 22 Jan 1945-2 Nov 1946	
CVG-151	CVG-151: 12 Feb 1945-6 Oct 1945	
CVG-152	CVG-152: 5 Mar 1945-21 Sep 1945	
CVG-153	CVG-153: 26 Mar 1945-15 Nov 1946; CVAG-15: 15 Nov 1946-1 Sep 1948; CVG-15(2nd): 1 Sep 1948-1 Dec 1949	This air group is one of only fourteen air groups (CVG or CVBG) which was not disestablished during the war or the post war drawdown.

Light Carrier Air Groups (CVLG) and Escort Carrier Air Groups (CVEG) 1 Mar 1942 to 15 Nov 1946. There were two variations of the CVG designation which added a modifying letter between the V and the G to identify air groups which operated from the smaller Light Carriers of the USS Independence (CVL-22) class (CVLG) and the similarly sized but slower USS Sangamon (CVE-26) class escort carriers (CVEG). (Note: CVEs of the Long Island, Charger, Bogue and Casablanca classes embarked a single "Composite (VC) squadron" which was composed of both fighter and torpedo bomber aircraft as their "air group". In the last nine months of the war there were ten Commencement Bay class CVEs commissioned. The Commencement Bay ships were the same size as the Sangamons but they embarked Marine Carrier Air Groups (MCVG) as those ships were to provide close air support for the island campaign which at that time included plans to invade the Japanese home islands in late 1945. The Marine Corps ground commanders pressed hard to get Marine aircraft aboard them and the CMC General Vandergrift personally flew to Hawaii to persuade Admiral Nimitz to make their case.) CVLGs and CVEGs consisted of about thirty aircraft, initially fighters, dive bombers and torpedo bombers but by the last year of the war they consisted of a single fighting (VF) and a single torpedo bomber (VT) squadron.

Group	Lineage	Notes
CVLG-21	CVLG-21: 15 May 1943-5 Nov 1945	
CVLG-22	CVLG-22: 30 Sep 1943-15 Sep 1945	
CVLG-23	CVLG-23: 16 Nov 1942-19 Sep 1945	
CVLG-24	CVLG-24: 31 Dec 1942-25 Sep 1945	
CVLG-25; CVEG-25	CVLG-25: 15 Feb 1943-28 Aug 1944; CVEG-25: 28 Aug 1944-20 Sep 1945	Converted from a light carrier air group to an escort carrier air group during the war.
CVEG-26	CVEG-26: 4 May 1942-13 Nov 1945	
CVLG-27	CVLG-27: 1 Mar 1942-26 Oct 1945	
CVLG-28	CVLG-28: 6 May 1942-6 Nov 1945	
CVLG-29	CVLG-29: 18 Jul 1942-10 Sep 1945	
CVLG-30	CVLG-30: 1 Apr 1943-12 Sep 1945	
CVLG-31	CVLG-31: 1 May 1943-28 Oct 1945	
CVLG-32	CVLG-32: 1 Jun 1943-13 Nov 1945	
CVEG-33	CVEG-33: 15 May 1944-19 Nov 1945	
CVLG-34	CVLG-34: 1 Apr 1945-5 Dec 1945	
CVEG-35	CVEG-35: 15 Jul 1943-19 Nov 1945	
CVEG-36	CVEG-36: 15 May 1944-28 Jan 1946	
CVEG-37	CVEG-37: 15 Jul 1943-20 Dec 1945	
CVLG-38; CVEG-38	CVLG-38: 16 Jun 1943-15 Aug 1944; CVEG-38: 15 Aug 1944-31 Jan 1946	Converted from a light carrier air group to an escort carrier air group during the war.
CVEG-39; CVLG-39	CVEG-39: 15 Mar 1945-2 Jul 1945; CVLG-39: 2 Jul 1945-10 Sep 1945	Converted from an escort carrier air group to a light carrier air group during the war.
CVEG-40	CVEG-40: 15 Jun 1943-19 Nov 1945	
CVEG-41	CVEG-41: 26 Mar 1945-15 Nov 1946; CVEG-1: 15 Nov 1946-1 Sep 1948	This air group is one of only two escort or light carrier air groups that was not disestablished during the war or the post war drawdown.
CVEG-42	CVEG-42: 15 Jul 1945-15 Nov 1946; CVEG-2: 15 Nov 1946-1 Sep 1948	This air group is one of only two escort or light carrier air groups that was not disestablished during the war or the post war drawdown.
CVLG-43	CVLG-43: 1 Aug 1943-8 Nov 1943	
CVEG-43	CVEG-43: 9 Aug 1945-17 Jun 1946	
CVLG-44	CVLG-44: 1 Feb 1944-18 Sep 1945	
CVLG-45	CVLG-45: 1 Apr 1944-10 Sep 1945	
CVLG-46	CVLG-46: 15 Apr 1944-14 Sep 1945	
CVLG-47	CVLG-47: 15 Apr 1944-21 Sep 1945	
CVLG-48	CVLG-48: 1 Jun 1944-2 Jan 1945	
CVEG-49; CVLG-49	CVEG-49: 10 Aug 1944-1 Jan 1945; CVLG-49: 1 Jan 1945-27 Nov 1945	Converted from an escort carrier air group to a light carrier air group during the war.
CVLG-50; CVEG-50	CVLG-50: 10 Aug 1944-1 Oct 1944; CVEG-50: 1 Oct 1944-29 Oct 1945	Converted from a light carrier air group to an escort carrier air group during the war.
CVLG-51	CVLG-51: 22 Sep 1943-13 Nov 1945	
CVLG-52	CVLG-52: 1 Sep 1943-8 Nov 1943	
CVLG-58	CVLG-58: 19 Mar 1946-15 Nov 1946; CVLG-1: 15 Nov 1946-1 Sep 1948	This air group was established six months after the end of WWII.
CVEG-60	CVEG-60: 15 Jul 1943-15 Nov 1945	
CVEG-66	CVEG-66: 1 Jan 1945-6 Jun 1945	

Night Carrier Air Groups (CVG(N)), (CVLG(N)) and (CVEG(N)) 2 Aug 1944 to 21 Jun 1946. In August 1944 the Navy began establishing night air groups which were specifically equipped and trained for combat at night. These night air groups were identified by appending a parenthetical N to the end of the designation"(N)". Each air group consisted of at least one Night Fighting (VFN) (sometimes styled (VF(N))) squadron and one Night Torpedo (VTN) squadron. The CVG(N)s also included at least one regular Fighting (VF) and potentially other regular squadrons as well. The VFN and VTN squadron aircraft were equipped with very early airborne radar and their pilots and aircrews were specially trained in its use and in night tactics.

Group	Lineage	Notes
CVLG(N)-41	CVLG(N)-41: 28 Aug 1944-25 Feb 1945	This air group is one of the first four night air groups which were established in August 1944.
CVLG(N)-42	CVLG(N)-42: 28 Aug 1944-2 Jan 1945	This air group is one of the first four night air groups which were established in August 1944.
CVLG(N)-43	CVLG(N)-34: 2 Aug 1944-2 Jan 1945	This air group is one of the first four night air groups which were established in August 1944.
CVLG(N)-52; CVG(N)-52	CVLG(N)-52: 20 Oct 1944-6 Jan 1945; CVG(N)-52: 6 Jan 1945-15 Dec 1945	Converted from a night light carrier air group to a night carrier air group during the war.
CVG(N)-53	CVG(N)-53: 2 Jan 1945-11 Jun 1945	
CVG(N)-55	CVG(N)-55: 1 Mar 1945-11 Dec 1945	
CVEG(N)-63	CVEG(N)-63: 20 Jun 1945-11 Dec 1945	This air group was the sole night escort carrier air group and was the last night carrier air group of any type to be established.
CVG(N)-90	CVG(N)-90: 25 Aug 1944-21 Jun 1946	This air group is one of the first four night air groups which were established in August 1944.
CVG(N)-91	CVG(N)-91: 5 Oct 1944-21 Jun 1946	

===== Carrier Air Groups 15 November 1946 to 1 September 1948 =====
On 15 November 1946 the seventeen Carrier Air Groups still in existence (eleven CVGs, three CVBGs, two CVEGs and one CVLG) were redesignated in accordance with a new Carrier Air Group Designation scheme.

USS Essex class Carrier Air Groups (CVAG) 15 Nov 1946 to 1 Sep 1948. The eleven CVGs were redesignated CVAGs, they were numbered 1 through 21 using odd numbers only and they were paired with Essex class aircraft carriers. Each of the eleven CVGs consisted of a Fighting (VF), Bombing Fighting (VBF), Bombing (VB) and Torpedo (VT) squadron. When the CVGs were redesignated to CVAG, the VBF squadrons were redesignated VF and the VB and VT squadrons were redesgnated Attack (VA) squadrons resulting in each CVAG consisting of two VF and two VA squadrons. The first VF and first VA squadron were numbered with the CVAG's number and the second VF and second VA squadron were numbered with the next consecutive even number. The letter 'A' was appended to the end of the squadron designation matching the 'A' in the CVAG designation. CVAG-1's squadrons were VF-1A, VF-2A, VA-1A and VA-2A; CVAG-5's squadrons were VF-5A, VF-6A, VA-5A and VA-6A; and CVAG-11's squadrons were VF-11A, VF-12A, VA-11A and VA-12A etc...

Group	Lineage	Notes	Tail Code
CVAG-1	Ranger Air Group: 1 Jul 1938-3 Aug 1943; CVG-4(1st): 3 Aug 1943-15 Nov 1946; CVAG-1: 15 Nov 1946-1 Sep 1948; CVG-1(2nd): 1 Sep 1948-20 Dec 1963; CVW-1: 20 Dec 1963–present	Still active, see CVW-1 in the "Current Carrier Air Wings" section.	T
CVAG-3	Saratoga Air Group: 1 Jul 1938-25 Sep 1943; CVG-3(1st): 25 Sep 1943-15 Nov 1946; CVAG-3: 15 Nov 1946-1 Sep 1948; CVG-3(2nd): 1 Sep 1948-20 Dec 1963; CVW-3: 20 Dec 1963–present	Still active, see CVW-3 in the "Current Carrier Air Wings" section.	K
CVAG-5	CVG-5(1st): 1 Jan 1943-15 Nov 1946; CVAG-5: 15 Nov 1946-1 Sep 1948; CVG-5(2nd): 1 Sep 1948-20 Dec 1963; CVW-5: 20 Dec 1963–present	Still active, see CVW-5 in the "Current Carrier Air Wings" section.	S
CVAG-7	CVG-18: 2 Jul 1943-15 Nov 1946; CVAG-7: 15 Nov 1946-1 Sep 1948; CVG-7(2nd): 1 Sep 1948-20 Dec 1963; CVW-7: 20 Dec 1963–present	Still active, see CVW-7 in the "Current Carrier Air Wings" section.	L
CVAG-9	CVG-20: 15 Oct 1943-15 Nov 1946; CVAG-9: 15 Nov 1946-1 Sep 1948; CVG-9(2nd): 1 Sep 1948-1 Dec 1949		PS
CVAG-11	CVG-11(1st): 10 Oct 1942-15 Nov 1946; CVAG-11: 15 Nov 1946-1 Sep 1948; CVG-11(2nd): 1 Sep 1948-20 Dec 1963; CVW-11: 20 Dec 1963–present	Still active, see CVW-11 in the "Current Carrier Air Wings" section.	V
CVAG-13	CVG-81: 1 Mar 1944-15 Nov 1946; CVAG-13: 15 Nov 1946-1 Sep 1948; CVG-13(2nd): 1 Sep 1948-30 Nov 1949		P
CVAG-15	CVG-153: 26 Mar 1945-15 Nov 1946; CVAG-15: 15 Nov 1946-1 Sep 1948; CVG-15(2nd): 1 Sep 1948-1 Dec 1949		A
CVAG-17	CVG-82: 1 Apr 1944-15 Nov 1946; CVAG-17: 15 Nov 1946-1 Sep 1948; CVG-17(2nd): 1 Sep 1948-15 Sep 1958		R
CVAG-19	CVG-19(1st): 1 Aug 1943-15 Nov 1946; CVAG-19: 15 Nov 1946-1 Sep 1948; CVG-19(2nd): 1 Sep 1948-20 Dec 1963; CVW-19: 20 Dec 1963-30 June 1977		B
CVAG-21	CVG-98: 28 Aug 1944-15 Nov 1946; CVAG-21: 15 Nov 1946-5 Aug 1947	Disestablished before the end of this time period.	RI

USS Midway class Carrier Air Groups (CVBG) 15 Nov 1946 to 1 Sep 1948. The three CVBGs retained the CVBG designation and remained paired with the three Midway class aircraft carriers but they were renumbered 1, 3 and 5. Each of the three CVBGs consisted of a Fighting (VF), Bombing Fighting (VBF), Bombing (VB) and Torpedo (VT) squadron. When the CVBGs were renumbered their VBF squadrons were redesignated VF and their VB and VT squadrons were redesgnated Attack (VA) squadrons resulting in each CVBG consisting of two VF and two VA squadrons. The first VF and first VA squadron were numbered with the CVBG's number and the second VF and second VA squadron were numbered with the next consecutive even number. The letter 'B' was appended to the end of the squadron designation matching the 'B' in the CVBG designation. CVBG-1's squadrons were VF-1B, VF-2B, VA-1B and VA-2B; CVBG-3's squadrons were VF-3B, VF-4B, VA-3B and VA-4B; and CVBG-5's squadrons were VF-5B, VF-6B, VA-5B and VA-6B.

Group	Lineage	Notes	Tail Code
CVBG-1	CVBG-74: 1 May 1945-15 Nov 1946; CVBG-1: 15 Nov 1946- 1 Sep 1948; CVG-2(2nd): 1 Sep 1948-20 Dec 1963; CVW-2: 20 Dec 1963–present	Still active, see CVW-2 in the "Current Carrier Air Wings" section.	M
CVBG-3	CVBG-75: 1 Jun 1945-15 Nov 1946; CVBG-3: 15 Nov 1946-1 Sep 1948; CVG-4(2nd): 1 Sep 1948-8 Jun 1950		F
CVBG-5	CVG-17(1st): 1 Jan 1943-23 Jan 1946; CVBG-17: 23 Jan 1946-15 Nov 1946; CVBG-5: 15 Nov 1946-1 Sep 1948; CVG-6(2nd): 1 Sep 1946-20 Dec 1963; CVW-6: 20 Dec 1963-1 Apr 1993		C

Light Carrier (CVLG) and Escort Carrier (CVEG) Air Groups 15 Nov 1946 to 15 Sep 1948. The single CVLG retained the CVLG designation, was renumbered CVLG-1 and was intended for light carriers of the Independence or Saipan classes and the two CVEGs were redesignated CVEG-1 and CVEG-2. Each of the three CVLG/CVEGs consisted of a Fighting (VF) and a Torpedo (VT) squadron. When the CVLG/CVEGs were renumbered their VT squadrons were redesgnated Attack (VA) squadrons resulting in each CVLG/CVEG consisting of one VF squadron and one VA squadron. The squadrons were numbered with the CVLG/CVEGs number and the letter 'L' or 'E' was appended to the end of the squadron designation matching the 'L' in the CVLG designation or the 'E' in the CVEG designation. CVLG-1's squadrons were VF-1L and VA-1L, CVEG-1's squadrons were VF-1E and VA-1E, and CVEG-2's squadrons were VF-2E and VA-2E. Five months later in April 1947 a third CVEG was established as CVEG-3 with VF-3E and VA-3E making a total of eighteen carrier air groups.

Group	Lineage	Notes	Tail Code
CVLG-1	CVLG-58: 19 Mar 1946-15 Nov 1946; CVLG-1: 15 Nov 1946-1 Sep 1948	All four CVLG/CVEGs were disestablished in September 1948.	SA
CVEG-1	CVEG-41: 26 Mar 1945-15 Nov 1946; CVEG-1: 15 Nov 1946-1 Sep 1948	All four CVLG/CVEGs were disestablished in September 1948.	BS
CVEG-2	CVEG-42: 15 Jul 1945-15 Nov 1946; CVEG-2: 15 Nov 1946-1 Sep 1948	All four CVLG/CVEGs were disestablished in September 1948.	SL
CVEG-3	CVEG-3: 21 Apr 1947-15 Sep 1948	All four CVLG/CVEGs were disestablished in September 1948.	

===== Carrier Air Groups 1 September 1948 to 20 December 1963 =====
On 1 September 1948 the thirteen Carrier Air Groups in existence on that date were again redesignated in accordance with a new Carrier Air Group designation scheme with CVAGs and CVBGs becoming simply "CVG" (the CVLG and three CVEGs were disestablished). The composition of the air group was changed as well with the addition of a third VF squadron to each air group. The squadron designations were changed with the suffix letters 'A' and 'B' being dropped and they were renumbered with the first one or two digits denoting the air group and the last digit denoting a place in that air group. Squadrons of CVG-1(2nd) were: VF-11, VF-12, VF-13, VA-14 and VA-15 and squadrons of CVG-15(2nd) were: VF-151, VF-152, VF-153, VA-154 and VA-155 etc... In 1949 and 1950 one of the two VA squadrons in each air group was converted to a fourth VF squadron making a standard air group composition of four VF and one VA squadron. It was also during this time that detachments of specialized aircraft such as airborne early warning aircraft, electronic countermeasures aircraft, photographic reconnaissance aircraft and heavy attack (nuclear bomber) aircraft began to be attached to deploying air groups.

Note: the parenthetical (1st), (2nd), (3rd) appended to some Carrier Air Group designations below are not a part of the Group's designation. They are added to indicate that the designation was used more than one time during the history of U.S. Naval Aviation and to specify which use of the designation is indicated. There is not necessarily any connection between Carrier Air Groups which shared the same designation.

Carrier Air Groups (CVG) redesignated on 1 Sep 1948. On 1 Sep 1948 the ten existing CVAGs and three existing CVBGs were all redesignated to CVG.

Group	Insignia	Lineage	Notes	Tail Code
CVG-1 (2nd)		Ranger Air Group: 1 Jul 1938-3 Aug 1943; CVG-4(1st): 3 Aug 1943-15 Nov 1946; CVAG-1: 15 Nov 1946-1 Sep 1948'; CVG-1(2nd): 1 Sep 1948-20 Dec 1963; CVW-1: 20 Dec 1963–present	Still active, see CVW-1 in the "Current Carrier Air Wings" section.	1946: T 1957: AB
CVG-2 (2nd)		CVBG-74: 1 May 1945-15 Nov 1946; CVBG-1: 15 Nov 1946- 1 Sep 1948; CVG-2(2nd): 1 Sep 1948-20 Dec 1963; CVW-2: 20 Dec 1963–present	Still active, see CVW-2 in the "Current Carrier Air Wings" section.	1946: M 1957: NE
CVG-3 (2nd)		Saratoga Air Group: 1 Jul 1938-25 Sep 1943; CVG-3(1st): 25 Sep 1943-15 Nov 1946; CVAG-3: 15 Nov 1946-1 Sep 1948; CVG-3(2nd): 1 Sep 1948-20 Dec 1963; CVW-3: 20 Dec 1963–present	Still active, see CVW-3 in the "Current Carrier Air Wings" section.	1946: K 1957: AC
CVG-4 (2nd)		CVBG-75: 1 Jun 1945-15 Nov 1946; CVBG-3: 15 Nov 1946-1 Sep 1948; CVG-4(2nd): 1 Sep 1948-8 Jun 1950		1946: F
CVG-5 (2nd)		CVG-5(1st): 1 Jan 1943-15 Nov 1946; CVAG-5: 15 Nov 1946-1 Sep 1948; CVG-5(2nd): 1 Sep 1948-20 Dec 1963; CVW-5: 20 Dec 1963–present	Still active, see CVW-5 in the "Current Carrier Air Wings" section.	1946: S 1957: NF
CVG-6 (2nd)		CVG-17(1st): 1 Jan 1943-23 Jan 1946; CVBG-17: 23 Jan 1946-15 Nov 1946; CVBG-5: 15 Nov 1946-1 Sep 1948; CVG-6(2nd): 1 Sep 1948-20 Dec 1963; CVW-6: 20 Dec 1963-1 Apr 1993		1946: C 1957: AF; 1963: AE
CVG-7 (2nd)		CVG-18: 2 Jul 1943-15 Nov 1946; CVAG-7: 15 Nov 1946-1 Sep 1948; CVG-7(2nd): 1 Sep 1948-20 Dec 1963; CVW-7: 20 Dec 1963–present	Still active, see CVW-7 in the "Current Carrier Air Wings" section.	1946: L 1957: AG
CVG-9 (2nd)		CVG-20: 15 Oct 1943-15 Nov 1946; CVAG-9: 15 Nov 1946-1 Sep 1948; CVG-9(2nd): 1 Sep 1948-1 Dec 1949		1946: PS; 1948: D
CVG-11 (2nd)		CVG-11(1st): 10 Oct 1942-15 Nov 1946; CVAG-11: 15 Nov 1946-1 Sep 1948; CVG-11(2nd): 1 Sep 1948-20 Dec 1963; CVW-11: 20 Dec 1963–present	Still active, see CVW-11 in the "Current Carrier Air Wings" section.	1946: V 1957: NH
CVG-13 (2nd)		CVG-81: 1 Mar 1944-15 Nov 1946; CVAG-13: 15 Nov 1946-1 Sep 1948; CVG-13(2nd): 1 Sep 1948-30 Nov 1949		1946: P
CVG-15 (2nd)		CVG-153: 26 Mar 1945-15 Nov 1946; CVAG-15: 15 Nov 1946-1 Sep 1948; CVG-15(2nd): 1 Sep 1948-1 Dec 1949		1946: A
CVG-17 (2nd)		CVG-82: 1 Apr 1944-15 Nov 1946; CVAG-17: 15 Nov 1946-1 Sep 1948; CVG-17(2nd): 1 Sep 1948-15 Sep 1958		1946: R 1957: AL
CVG-19 (2nd)		CVG-19(1st): 1 Aug 1943-15 Nov 1946; CVAG-19: 15 Nov 1946-1 Sep 1948; CVG-19(2nd): 1 Sep 1948-20 Dec 1963; CVW-19: 20 Dec 1963-30 June 1977		1946: B 1957: NM

Additional CVG established in 1948. On 15 September 1948, only 14 days after the 1 September 1948 redesignations, a fourteenth short lived air group was established.

Group	Insignia	Lineage	Notes	Tail Code
CVG-21 (1st)		CVG-21(1st): 15 Sep 1948-15 Mar 1949	Establishment was cancelled after only six months, was never operational.	

CVGs established for the Korean War. With the outbreak of the Korean War in June 1950 seven new carrier air groups were established, three within the first three months of the war with two more following in 1951 and two more in 1952.

Group	Insignia	Lineage	Notes	Tail Code
CVG-101 CVG-14 (2nd)		CVG-101: 1 Aug 1950-4 Feb 1952; CVG-14(2nd): 4 Feb 1952-20 Dec 1963; CVW-14: 20 Dec 1963-2007	Established to receive USNR squadrons activated for the Korean War. Redesignated CVG-14(2nd) when its squadrons were permanently activated.	1950: A 1957: NK
CVG-102 CVG-12 (2nd) RCVG-12		CVG-102: 1 Aug 1950-4 Feb 1952; CVG-12(2nd): 5 Feb 1952-1 Apr 1958; RCVG-12: 1 Apr 1958-20 Dec 1963; RCVW-12: 20 Dec 1963-30 Jun 1970	Established to receive USNR squadrons activated for the Korean War. Redesignated CVG-12(2nd) when its squadrons were permanently activated. Converted to a "Readiness Carrier Air Group" (RCVG) five years after the end of the Korean War becoming a training group consisting of Fleet Replacement Squadrons. (Note: Trained replacement aircrew and maintenance personnel for the squadrons of the deploying Pacific Fleet Carrier Air Groups)	1950: D 1957: NJ
CVG-4 (3rd) RCVG-4		CVG-4(3rd): 1 Sep 1950-1 Apr 1958; RCVG-4: 1 Apr 1958-20 Dec 1963; RCVW-4: 20 Dec 1963-1 Jun 1970	Converted to a "Readiness Carrier Air Group" (RCVG) five years after the end of the Korean War becoming a training group consisting of Fleet Replacement Squadrons. (Note: Trained replacement aircrew and maintenance personnel for the squadrons of the deploying Atlantic Fleet Carrier Air Groups)	1950: F 1957: AD
CVG-15 (3rd)		CVG-15(3rd): 5 Apr 1951-20 Dec 1963; CVW-15: 20 Dec 1953-31 Mar 1995	Established to receive USNR squadrons activated for the Korean War.	1951: H 1957: NL
CVG-8 (2nd)		CVG-8(2nd): 9 Apr 1951-20 Dec 1963; CVW-8 20 Dec 1963–present	Established to receive USNR squadrons activated for the Korean War. Still active, see CVW-8 in the "Current Carrier Air Wings" section.	1951: E 1957: AJ
CVG-9 (3rd)		CVG-9 (3rd): 26 Mar 1952-20 Dec 1963; CVW-9: 20 Dec 1963–present	Still active, see CVW-9 in the "Current Carrier Air Wings" section.	1952: N 1957: NG
CVG-10 (2nd)		CVG-10(2nd): 1 May 1952-20 Dec 1963; CVW-10(1st): 20 Dec 1963-20 Nov 1969		1952: P 1957: AK

CVGs established after the end of the Korean War. After war's end three more carrier air groups were established from 1955 to 1961. Also from 1955 to 1956 the air group composition was changed with the addition of a second VA squadron to each air group making a standard air group of four VF and two VA squadrons.

Group	Insignia	Lineage	Notes	Tail Code
CVG-21 (2nd)		CVG-21(2nd): 1 Jul 1955-20 Dec-1963; CVW-21: 20 Dec 1963-12 Dec 1975		1955: G 1957: NP
CVG-16 (2nd)		CVG-16(2nd): 1 Sep 1960-20 Dec 1963; CVW-16: 20 Dec 1963-30 Jun 1970		1960: AH
CVG-13 (3rd)		CVG-13(3rd): 21 Aug 1961-1 Oct 1962	This was a short lived group being disestablished after only a thirteen-month existence	1961: AE

Two letter tail codes with a first letter "A" denote Atlantic Fleet airwings, while "N" denotes Pacific Fleet airwings.

===== Carrier Air Wings 20 December 1963 to present =====
On 20 December 1963 there were fifteen Carrier Air Groups (CVG) and two Readiness Carrier Air Groups (RCVG) in existence and on that day they were all redesignated Carrier Air Wings (CVW) and Readiness Carrier Air Wings (RCVW). Eight of those seventeen wings are still active and are listed at the top of this article in the "Current Carrier Air Wings" section, the other nine have been disestablished or deactivated and are listed in the table below.

Carrier Air Groups redesignated to Carrier Air Wings on 20 December 1963. Listed below are the nine of seventeen CVGs/RCVGs redesignated CVWs/RCVWs on 20 December 1963 which were ultimately disestablished.

Wing	Insignia	Lineage	Notes	Tail Code
RCVW-4		CVG-4(3rd): 1 Sep 1950-1 Apr 1958; RCVG-4: 1 Apr 1958-20 Dec 1963; RCVW-4: 20 Dec 1963-1 Jun 1970	A training wing consisting of Fleet Replacement Squadrons (FRS). (Note: Trained replacement aircrew and maintenance personnel for the squadrons of Atlantic Fleet Carrier Air Wings) Disestablished 1 Jun 1970 with its squadrons ultimately realigning under the Atlantic Fleet type wings which were being established between 1970 and 1973. Its tail code is still used by Atlantic Fleet fixed wing CVW aircraft FRSs.	AD
CVW-6		CVG-17(1st): 1 Jan 1943-23 Jan 1946; CVBG-17: 23 Jan 1946-15 Nov 1946; CVBG-5: 15 Nov 1946-1 Sep 1948; CVG-6(2nd): 1 Sep 1948-20 Dec 1963; CVW-6: 20 Dec 1963-1 Apr 1993		AE
CVW-10 (1st)		CVG-10(2nd): 1 May 1952-20 Dec 1963; CVW-10(1st): 20 Dec 1963-20 Nov 1969		AK
RCVW-12		CVG-102: 1 Aug 1950-4 Feb 1952; CVG-12(2nd): 5 Feb 1952-1 Apr 1958; RCVG-12: 1 Apr 1958-20 Dec 1963; RCVW-12: 20 Dec 1963-30 Jun 1970	A training wing consisting of Fleet Replacement Squadrons (FRS). (Note: Trained replacement aircrew and maintenance personnel for the squadrons of Pacific Fleet Carrier Air Wings) Disestablished 30 Jun 1970 with its squadrons ultimately realigning under the Pacific Fleet functional wings which were established in 1973. Its tail code is still used by Pacific Fleet fixed wing CVW aircraft FRSs.	NJ
CVW-14		CVG-101: 1 Aug 1950-4 Feb 1952; CVG-14(2nd): 4 Feb 1952-20 Dec 1963; CVW-14: 20 Dec 1963-2007	Deactivated 31 March 2017. Had been under-strength in squadrons, had not deployed since 2011 and had been in reduced manning since 1 October 2013. Deactivation was originally begun in 2012 but was halted due to congressional action. Deactivation reinitiated and completed in 2017.	NK
CVW-15		CVG-15(3rd): 5 Apr 1951-20 Dec 1963; CVW-15: 20 Dec 1953-31 Mar 1995	Tail code NL is now used by land based "expeditionary" VAQ squadrons of Electronic Attack Wing Pacific. (Note: When the wing was disestablished its VAQ squadron was repurposed as the first expeditionary VAQ squadron. The 'NL' tail code remained painted on that squadron's aircraft and from that point on it was assigned to all new expeditionary VAQ squadrons)	NL
CVW-16		CVG-16(2nd): 1 Sep 1960-20 Dec 1963; CVW-16: 20 Dec 1963-30 Jun 1970		AH
CVW-19		CVG-19(1st): 1 Aug 1943-15 Nov 1946; CVAG-19: 15 Nov 1946-1 Sep 1948; CVG-19(2nd): 1 Sep 1948-20 Dec 1963; CVW-19: 20 Dec 1963-30 June 1977		NM
CVW-21		CVG-21(2nd): 1 Jul 1955-20 Dec-1963; CVW-21: 20 Dec 1963-12 Dec 1975		NP

There were five new Carrier Air Wings (CVW) established from 1966 through 1986, three active component wings and two USNR wings. Three of those CVWs have been disestablished and one has been converted to a land based functional wing. The fifth is CVW-17 which was established in 1966 and is still an active air wing, it is listed at the top of the article in the "Current Carrier Air Wings" section.

Carrier Air Wings established after 20 December 1963. The four CVWs which were established after 20 December 1963 and which have been disestablished, or in the case of CVWR-20 converted to a functional wing, are listed here in order of establishment date.

Wing	Insignia	Lineage	Notes	Tail Code
CVWR-20		CVWR-20: 1 Apr 1970-1 Apr 2007; TSW: 1 Apr 2007–present	Reserve Carrier Air Wing (CVWR). Still exists as Tactical Support Wing (TSW), see "Current Functional Wings" section.	AF
CVWR-30		CVWR-30: 1 Apr 1970-31 Dec 1994	Reserve Carrier Air Wing (CVWR).	ND
CVW-13		CVW-13: 1 Mar 1984-1 Jan 1991		AK
CVW-10 (2nd)		CVW-10(2nd): 7 Nov 1986-1 Jun 1988	Planned for assignment to USS Independence (CV-62) but did not deploy before it was disestablished only a year and a half later.	NM

Tail codes with a first letter "A" denote Atlantic Fleet airwings, while "N" denotes Pacific Fleet airwings.

==== Air Task Groups (ATG) and Antisubmarine Carrier Air Groups (CVSG) 1951-1975 ====
First in the 1950s and then in the 1960s two different unique types of Air Groups were formed or established. Beginning in 1951 temporary Air Task Groups (ATG) were formed to address a shortage of Carrier Air Groups, and beginning in 1960 specialized Carrier Air Groups were established as Antisubmarine Carrier Air Groups (CVSG) to operate from WWII Essex class aircraft carriers which were newly converted to serve as specialized Antisubmarine Aircraft Carriers (CVS).

===== Air Task Groups October 1951 to 19 January 1959 =====
Two "Air Task Groups" (ATG) were formed in 1951 to address a shortage of Carrier Air Groups (CVG)s needed for Korean War operations. The number of CVGs was statutorily limited but the Navy needed more of them, the solution was to form two "temporary task groups" by reassigning squadrons from existing CVGs and using them to form an ATG. This reduced the number of squadrons in those CVGs from the then typical five total VF/VA squadrons to four total VF/VA squadrons but it gave the Navy two more "CVGs". They were CVGs in every respect but in name but as temporary task groups they were neither formerly established or disestablished, instead they were "formed" and "disbanded." Though the two ATGs were initially created in response to the Korean War they outlasted the war operating until the end of the decade and they were joined after the war in 1955 by six more ATGs.

Air Task Groups (ATG). Two ATGs were formed in 1951 and six more in 1955. They were all disbanded by 1959.

Group	Insignia	Lineage	Notes	Tail Code
CVG-19X ATG-2	ATG-2-insignia	CVG-19X:1 Aug 1950-Oct 1951; ATG-2: Oct 1951-1 Apr 1958	Split out of CVG-19 and named "CVG-19X" (with CVG-19's Tail Code "B") on 1 Aug 1950, renamed ATG-2 in Oct 1951.	1950 B 1951 W 1957 NB
ATG-1	ATG-1-Insignia	ATG-1: Oct 1951-23 Feb 1959		1951 U 1957 NA
ATG-3	ATG-3-insignia	ATG-3: 5 Mar 1955-11 Apr 1958		1955 Y 1957 NC
ATG-4	ATG-4-insignia	ATG-4: 30 Mar 1955-19 Jan 1959		1955 Z 1957 ND
ATG-181	ATG-181 insignia	ATG-181: 5 Mar 1955-15 Aug 1958		1955 I 1957 AM
ATG-182	Air Task Group 182 (United States Navy) insignia, 1957	ATG-182: 1 Jul 1955-Jan 1959		1955 O 1957 AN
ATG-201	ATG-201-Insignia	ATG-201: Jun 1955-Nov 1958		1955 J 1957 AP
ATG-202	ATG-202 Insignia	ATG-202: 1 Jul 1955-Jan 1959		1955 X 1957 AQ

Tail codes with a first letter "A" denote Atlantic Fleet Air Task Groups, while "N" denotes Pacific Fleet Air Task Groups.

===== Antisubmarine Carrier Air Groups 1 April 1960 to 30 July 1975 =====
In 1960 some WWII Essex class aircraft carriers were converted to "Anti-Submarine Carriers" (CVS) and were paired with newly established "Antisubmarine Carrier Air Groups" (CVSG). CVSGs initially consisted of one Helicopter Antisubmarine (HS) squadron of HSS-1 Sea Bats (replaced by the mid-1960s by SH-3 Sea Kings) and two Air Antisubmarine (VS) squadrons of S-2 Trackers, along with a detachment of airborne early warning E-1 Tracers from Airborne Early Warning (VAW) squadrons and a detachment of A-4 Skyhawks for defense of the carrier and air group. A second HS and third VS squadron were added to each group later in the decade when only four of the CVSGs remained. After disestablishment of those last four CVSGs four of the VS squadrons were disestablished and the remaining VS squadrons and the HS squadrons were added to the existing Carrier Air Wings (CVW), one of each to each CVW.

Antisubmarine Carrier Air Groups (CVSG). The CVSGs were not included in the 20 December 1963 redesignation of Carrier Air Groups (CVG)s to Carrier Air Wings (CVW)s and were therefore the last Carrier Air Groups to exist in the U.S. Navy.

Group	Insignia	Lineage	Notes	Tail Code
RCVSG-50		RCVSG-50: 30 Jun 1960-17 Feb 1971	A training group of Fleet Replacement Squadrons (FRS). (Note: Trained replacement aircrew and maintenance personnel for the squadrons of Atlantic Fleet CVSGs) When the group was disestablished the FRSs were realigned under the Atlantic Fleet type wings established from 1970 to 1973. Its tail code remained in use by Atlantic Fleet fixed and rotary wing carrier based ASW aircraft FRSs until 1997 when the last of those squadrons was disestablished.	AR
RCVSG-51		RCVSG-51: 30 Jun 1960-30 Jun 1970	A training group of Fleet Replacement Squadrons (FRS). (Note: Trained replacement aircrew and maintenance personnel for the squadrons of Pacific Fleet CVSGs) When the group was disestablished the FRSs were ultimately realigned under the Pacific Fleet functional wings established in 1973. Its tail code remained in use by Pacific Fleet fixed and rotary wing carrier based ASW aircraft FRSs until 2012 when the last of those squadrons was deactivated.	RA
CVSG-52		CVSG-52: 1 Jun 1960-15 Dec 1969		AS
CVSG-53		CVSG-53: 1 Apr 1960-30 Jun 1973		NS
CVSG-54		CVSG-54: 18 May 1960-1 Jul 1972		AT
CVSG-55		CVSG-55: 1 Sep 1960-27 Sep 1968		NU
CVSG-56		CVSG-56: 25 May 1960-30 Jun 1973		AU
CVSG-57		CVSG-57: 3 Jan 1961-30 Sep 1969		NV
CVSG-58		CVSG-58: 6 Jun 1960-31 May 1966		AV
CVSG-59		CVSG-59: 1 Apr 1960-30 Jun 1973		NT
CVSG-60		CVSG-60: 2 May 1960-1 Oct 1968		AW
CVSG-62		CVSG-62: 1 Sep 1961-1 Oct 1962	The last of the CVSGs to be established, it was determined to be excess and was disestablished after only a year.	AX

Tail codes with a first letter "A" denoted Atlantic Fleet air groups, while "N" denoted Pacific Fleet air groups. RCVSG 51 was also a Pacific Fleet air group though its tail code was "RA".

On 1 May 1970 the Navy Reserve established two CVSGRs. They were modeled on the four CVGSs which still existed at that time with each CVSGR consisting of three Air Antisubmarine (VS) squadrons and two Helicopter Antisubmarine (HS) squadrons along with an Airborne Early Warning (VAW) squadron and an Antisubmarine Fighter (VSF) squadron.

Reserve Antisubmarine Carrier Air Groups (CVSGR). The groups existed for six years and upon disestablishment both wings' VS squadrons were disestablished and the Navy Reserve established a type wing, Helicopter Wing Reserve, to receive the four helicopter squadrons.

Group	Insignia	Lineage	Notes	Tail Code
CVSGR-70		CVSGR-70: 1 May 1970-30 Jun 1976		AW
CVSGR-80		CVSGR-80: 1 May 1970-30 Jul 1976	Tail Code was adopted by Helicopter Wing Reserve and is in use today by the sole USNR helicopter squadron.	NW

=== Disestablished functional and type wings 1937 to present ===
The U.S. Navy has operated wings other than carrier air groups/carrier air wings since 1 October 1937 when it established five "Patrol Wings". These wings have been established, disestablished or re-designated as the Navy has operated different aircraft through the years since then. The tables below list the Navy's wings other than carrier air groups/carrier air wings which have been disestablished, they also include previously used or no longer used designations of disestablished or currently active wings. For example, Patrol and Reconnaissance Wing FIVE was established in October 1937 as Patrol Wing 5, it was re-designated Fleet Air Wing 5 in November 1942, re-designated back to Patrol Wing FIVE in 1973 and finally redesignated to its last designation of Patrol and Reconnaissance Wing FIVE in 1999. It was disestablished in 2009. Patrol Wing 5, Fleet Air Wing 5 and Patrol and Reconnaissance Wing FIVE are not three disestablished wings, they are three designations used during the existence of a single wing which was established in October 1937 and disestablished in 2009. Similarly the currently active Helicopter Maritime Strike Wing Atlantic Fleet (HSMWINGLANT) was previously designated Helicopter Anti-Submarine (Light) Wing Atlantic Fleet (HSLWINGLANT), before that it was designated Helicopter Anti-Submarine (Light) Wing ONE (HSLWING ONE) and before that it was designated Helicopter Sea Control Wing THREE (HELSEACONWING THREE). HELSEACONWING THREE, HSLWING ONE and HSLWINGLANT are not three separate disestablished wings as the wing still exists as HSMWINGLANT; they are former designations of the currently active wing which are no longer used.

==== Fleet Airship Wings 1942 to 1961 ====
Fleet Airship Wings (FASW) were established to operate the airship force that the Navy created in WWII. The Navy operated airships prior to the war but individual airships were assigned to airship stations; the airship force was not organized into squadrons, groups and wings until WWII. Note: the parenthetical (1st) and (2nd) appended to the two FASW 1 entries are not a part of either wing's designation. They are added to indicate that the FASW 1 designation was used to designate two separate unrelated wings, the first was the WWII wing and the second was created after the war to operate the Navy's postwar lighter-than-air fleet.

WWII Atlantic Fleet Airship Groups and Wings. On 2 January 1942 the Atlantic Fleet established Airship Patrol Group 1 at NAS Lakehurst, NJ. to serve as the administrative command for airship squadrons operating along the east coast of the United States. That group would eventually be designated Fleet Airship Wing ONE and the Atlantic Fleet would establish three more Fleet Airship Wings.

Wing	Insignia	Lineage	Composition	Stations
Airship Patrol Group; ONE Fleet Airship Group; ONE Fleet Airship Wing; ONE(1st)		APG-1: (Note: Airship Patrol Group) 2 Jan 1942-1 Nov 1942; FASG-1: (Note: Fleet Airship Group) 1 Nov 1942-15 Jul 1943; FASW-1(1st): (Note: Fleet Airship Wing) 15 Jul 1943-16 Jan 1946	Four ZP (Note: prior to 15 July 1943 "Airship Patrol (ZP) squadron" 15 July and after "Blimp Patrol (ZP) squadron") squadrons and one HEDRON (Note: Headquarters Squadron: The group/wing maintenance and repair organization. HEDRON dets directly supported ZP squadrons)	NAS Lakehurst, NJ. NAS Glynco, GA; NAS Weeksville, NC; NAS South Weymouth, MA
Fleet Airship Group; TWO Fleet Airship Wing; TWO		FASG-2: 1 Mar 1943-15 Jul 1943; FASW-2: 15 Jul 1943-16 Jun 1945	Four ZP squadrons and one HEDRON	NAS Richmond, FL. NAS Houma, LA; NAS Hitchcock, TX
Fleet Airship Wing; FOUR		FASW-4: 2 Aug 1943-15 Jul 1945	Two ZP squadrons and one HEDRON	Recife, Brazil. São Luís, Maranhão, Brazil; Maceió, Brazil
Fleet Airship Wing; FIVE		FASW-5: 2 Aug 1943-11 Dec 1944	One ZP squadron and one HEDRON	Naval Base Trinidad

Fleet Airship Wing 30: On 1 December 1942 Fleet Airship Wing 30 was established at NAS Lakehurst one echelon above Fleet Airship Groups 1 and 2 to manage those groups. On 15 July 1943 the wing was redesignated Fleet Airships Atlantic and the subordinate groups were redesignated Fleet Airship Wings 1 and 2.

Wing	Insignia	Lineage	Groups
Fleet Airship Wing; THIRTY		FASW-30: 1 Dec 1942-15 Jul 1943; FASL: (Note: Fleet Airships Atlantic: Fleet Airship Wings 1, 2, 4 and 5 and the sole Blimp Utility Squadron (ZJ-1) reported to Fleet Airships Atlantic) 15 Jul 1943-16 Jan 1946	FASG-1; FASG-2

World War II Pacific Fleet Airship Group/Wing. The Pacific Fleet airship force consisted of a single wing which was established 1 October 1942 and disestablished 23 January 1946. During the less than three and a half year course of its existence it carried four designations. It was established as Airship Patrol Group 3 at NAS Moffatt Field on 1 October 1942 and two months later on 1 December 1942 redesignated Fleet Airship Wing 31 when the Atlantic Fleet established Fleet Airship Wing 30. On 15 July 1943 when Fleet Airship Wing 30 was redesignated Fleet Airships Atlantic this wing was again redesignated being dual designated as both Fleet Airships Pacific and Fleet Airship Wing 3. It conducted operations under the designation of Fleet Airship Wing 3 and administered the wing's blimp squadrons as Fleet Airships Pacific. The wing was disestablished on 23 January 1946.

Wing	Insignia	Lineage	Squadrons/Stations	
Airship Patrol Group 3 Fleet Airship Wing; THIRTY-ONE Fleet Airship Wing; THREE (Note: Fleet Airship Wing THREE was dual designated as "Fleet Airships Pacific")		APG-3: 1 Oct 1942-1 Dec 1942; FASW-31: 1 Dec 1942-15 Jul 1943; FASW-3: (Note: dual designated Fleet Airships Pacific) 15 Jul 1943- 23 Jan 1946	Three ZP squadrons and one HEDRON	NAS Moffett Field, CA. NAS Santa Ana, CA. NAS Tillamook, OR.

Post WWII Airship Wing. A new wing was established at NAS Lakehurst in 1949 to operate the Navy's post war Lighter than Air Fleet. It operated until 1961 when the Navy's airship operations came to an end.

Wing	Insignia	Lineage	Squadrons/Stations	
Fleet Airship Wing; ONE(2nd)	FASW-1 insignia	FASW-1(2nd) 20 Jan 1949-31 Oct 1961	(4) ZP sqdns (1) ZX (Note: Airship Development squadron) sqdn (1) ZW (Note: Airship Airborne Early Warning squadron) sqdn	Established at NAS Lakehurst, NJ., moved to NAS Weeksville, NC in August 1949 and back to NAS Lakehurst in September 1957. Also, some sqdns were based at NAS Glynco

==== Airborne Early Warning Wings (Atlantic and Pacific Barriers) 1955 to 1965 ====
From 1955 to 1965 the U.S. Navy operated seaward extensions of the nation's Distant Early Warning line (DEW line). These extensions were known as the Atlantic Barrier and the Pacific Barrier and they were patrolled by land based Airborne Early Warning (VW) squadrons flying the WV-2/EC-121K Warning Star.

Airborne Early Warning Wings.

Wing	Insignia	Lineage	Squadrons/Stations		Notes
AEWWINGLANT (Note: Airborne Early Warning Wing, Atlantic) (First use) (Note: The AEWWINGLANT designation was again used from Sep 1993 to Sep 2005 by a Type Wing responsible for carrier based E-2 aircraft squadrons. This wing and that wing are unrelated though they shared the same designation.)		AEWWINGLANT: 1 Jul 1955-26 Aug 1965	HQ (2) VW sqdns (1) VW sqdn	NAS Argentia, Newfoundland; NAS Patuxent River, MD; NAS Argentia, Newfoundland	Disestablished by 26 Aug 1965 when the Atlantic Barrier ceased operations.
AEWWINGPAC (Note: Airborne Early Warning Wing, Pacific) (First use) (Note: The AEWWINGPAC designation was again used from Aug 1993 to Sep 2005 by a Type Wing responsible for carrier based E-2 aircraft squadrons. This wing and that wing are unrelated though they shared the same designation.)		AEWWINGPAC: 10 Jan 1956-1 Feb 1960	HQ (3) VW sqdns	All located at NAS Barbers Point, HI	Disestablished 1 Feb 1960 when the wing and its sqdns were merged into a single sqdn "AEW Barrier Squadron Pacific" (AEWBARRONPAC) (Note: AEWBARRONPAC was disestablished on 30 June 1965 with the conclusion of the operation of the Pacific Barrier)

==== Training Air Wings 1971 to 1992 ====
Prior to the establishment of Training Air Wings, Navy, Marine Corps and Coast Guard flight training was conducted by Training Squadrons organized under the Flag Officers "Chief of Naval Air Basic Training" and "Chief of Naval Air Advanced Training" which were both subordinate to the "Chief of Naval Air Training". In 1971 and 1972 Eight Training Air Wings were established, each under the command of a Captain who reported directly to the Chief of Naval Air Training eliminating the positions of Chief of Naval Air Basic Training and Chief of Naval Air Advanced Training. When first established included in the TRAWINGs were the Naval Air Stations from which they operated as well as the Training Squadrons (VT) and (HT). In the 1990s the Navy underwent a reorganization which moved command of shore facilities into chains of command separate from operating forces, that reorganization extended into the Naval Air Training Command and command of the Naval Air Stations from which the TRAWINGs operated was moved into a separate chain of command leaving the TRAWINGS in command of only the training squadrons.

Wing	Insignia	Lineage	Station / Squadrons	Notes	Tail Code
TRAWING; THREE		TAW-3: 1 Oct 1971-31 Aug 1992	NAS Chase Field, TX (3) Adv Jet training sqdns	Disestablished with the closure of NAS Chase Field and disestablishment of subordinate squadrons.	C
TRAWING; SEVEN		TAW-7: 1 Feb 1972-1 Oct 1976	NAS Saufely Field, FL (2) Primary training sqdns	Disestablished with deactivation of the Saufley Field airfield and disestablishment of subordinate squadrons.	2S
TRAWING; EIGHT		TAW-8: 1972-1974	NAS Glynco, GA (1) NFO training sqdn	Disestablished with closure of NAS Glynco. Subordinate squadron was relocated to NAS Pensacola and realigned under TRAWING SIX.	

==== Patrol, Fleet Air, and Patrol and Reconnaissance Wings 1937 to present ====
In 1937 the Navy's first wings were created when it established five "Patrol Wings" consisting of squadrons of land based or amphibious patrol aircraft.

There have been twenty-five Patrol Wings/Fleet Air Wings/Patrol and Reconnaissance Wings since the first five Patrol Wings were established in 1937, two of those twenty-five still exist today. Three of those twenty-five were USNR wings, none of which exist today.

The tables in this section list disestablished wings as well as former no longer used designations of the two current Patrol and Reconnaissance Wings. Note: the parenthetical (1st) and (2nd) appended to some wing designations below are not a part of the wing's designation. They are added to indicate that the designation was used more than one time during the history of U.S. Naval Aviation and to specify which use of the designation is indicated. There is not necessarily any connection between Fleet Air Wings and/or Patrol Wings which shared the same designation.

===== Patrol Wings 1937 to 1942 =====
The Navy's first five Patrol Wings were established on 1 Oct 1937. Three more were established in the 12 months prior to the U.S. entry in WWII and four more in the first 11 months of the war.

Wing	Insignia	Lineage	Notes
PATWING ONE (1st)		PATWING-1(1st): 1 Oct 1937-1 Nov 1942; FAW-1: 1 Nov 1942-30 Jun 1973; PATWING-1(2nd): 30 Jun 1973-1 Jun 1999; PATRECONWING-1: 1 Jun 1999-present	Original 5 PATWINGs
PATWING TWO (1st)		PATWING TWO-2(1st): 1 Oct 1937-1 Nov 1942; FAW-2: 1 Nov 1942-30 Jun 1973; PATWING-2(2nd): 30 Jun 1973-8 Jun 1993	Original 5 PATWINGs
PATWING THREE		PATWING-3: 1 Oct 1937-1 Nov 1942; FAW-3: 1 Nov 1942-30 Jun 1971	Original 5 PATWINGs
PATWING FOUR (1st)		PATWING-4: 1 Oct 1937-1 Nov 1942; FAW-4: 1 Nov 1942-30 Jun 1970	Original 5 PATWINGs
PATWING FIVE (1st)		PATWING-5(1st): 1 Oct 1937-1 Nov 1942; FAW-5: 1 Nov 1942-30 Jun 1973; PATWING-5(2nd): 30 Jun 1973-26 Mar 1999; PATRECONWING-5: 26 Mar 1999–2009	Original 5 PATWINGs
PATWING TEN (1st)		PATWING-10(1st): Dec 1940-1 Nov 1942; FAW-10(1st): 1 Nov 1942-1 Jun 1947	Established within 12 months prior to U.S. entry in WWII
PATWING SEVEN		PATWING Support Force: 1 Mar 1941-1 Jul 1941; PATWING-7: 1 Jul 1941-1 Nov 1942; FAW-7: 1 Nov 1942-4 Aug 1945	Established within 12 months prior to U.S. entry in WWII
PATWING EIGHT		PATWING-8: 8 Jul 1941-1 Nov 1942; FAW-8(1st): 1 Nov 1942-3 Jul 1946	Established within 12 months prior to U.S. entry in WWII
PATWING NINE		PATWING-9: Apr 1942-1 Nov 1942; FAW-9: 1 Nov 1942-19 Jul 1945	Established in the first 11 months of WWII
PATWING ELEVEN (1st)		PATWING-11(1st): 15 Aug 1942-1 Nov 1942; FAW-11: 1 Nov 1942-30 Jun 1973; PATWING-11(2nd): 30 Jun 1973-26 Mar 1999; PATRECONWING-11: 26 Mar 1999-present	Established in the first 11 months of WWII
PATWING TWELVE		PATWING-12: 16 Sep 1942-1 Nov 1942; FAW-12: 1 Nov 1942-14 Jul 1945	Established in the first 11 months of WWII
PATWING FOURTEEN		PATWING-14: 15 Oct 1942-1 Nov 1942; FAW-14: 1 Nov 1942-1969	Established in the first 11 months of WWII

===== Fleet Air Wings 1 November 1942 to 30 June 1973 =====
On 1 Nov 1942 all twelve Patrol Wings were redesignated Fleet Air Wings (FAW), five more Fleet Air Wings were established during the remainder of WWII and three more after the war, the last in 1965.

Wing	Insignia	Lineage	Notes
FAW-1		PATWING-1(1st): 1 Oct 1937-1 Nov 1942; FAW-1: 1 Nov 1942-30 Jun 1973; PATWING-1(2nd): 30 Jun 1973-1 Jun 1999; PATRECONWING-1: 1 Jun 1999-present	
FAW-2		PATWING TWO-2(1st): 1 Oct 1937-1 Nov 1942; FAW-2: 1 Nov 1942-30 Jun 1973; PATWING-2(2nd): 30 Jun 1973-8 Jun 1993	
FAW-3		PATWING-3: 1 Oct 1937-1 Nov 1942; FAW-3: 1 Nov 1942-30 Jun 1971	
FAW-4		PATWING-4: 1 Oct 1937-1 Nov 1942; FAW-4: 1 Nov 1942-30 Jun 1970	
FAW-5		PATWING-5(1st): 1 Oct 1937-1 Nov 1942; FAW-5: 1 Nov 1942-30 Jun 1973; PATWING-5(2nd): 30 Jun 1973-26 Mar 1999; PATRECONWING-5: 26 Mar 1999-2009	
FAW-7		PATWING Support Force: 1 Mar 1941-1 Jul 1941; PATWING-7: 1 Jul 1941-1 Nov 1942; FAW-7: 1 Nov 1942-4 Aug 1945	Disestablished during WWII or the post war drawdown.
FAW-8(1st)		PATWING-8: 8 Jul 1941-1 Nov 1942; FAW-8(1st): 1 Nov 1942-3 Jul 1946	Disestablished during WWII or the post war drawdown.
FAW-9		PATWING-9: Apr 1942-1 Nov 1942; FAW-9: 1 Nov 1942-19 Jul 1945	Disestablished during WWII or the post war drawdown.
FAW-10(1st)		PATWING-10(1st): Dec 1940-1 Nov 1942; FAW-10(1st): 1 Nov 1942-1 Jun 1947	Disestablished during WWII or the post war drawdown.
FAW-11		PATWING-11(1st): 15 Aug 1942-1 Nov 1942; FAW-11: 1 Nov 1942-30 Jun 1973; PATWING-11(2nd): 30 Jun 1973-26 Mar 1999; PATRECONWING-11: 26 Mar 1999–present	
FAW-12		PATWING-12: 16 Sep 1942-1 Nov 1942; FAW-12: 1 Nov 1942-14 Jul 1945	Disestablished during WWII or the post war drawdown.
FAW-14		PATWING-14: 15 Oct 1942-1 Nov 1942; FAW-14: 1 Nov 1942-1969	
FAW-6(1st)		FAW-6: 2 Nov 1942-1 Dec 1945	Disestablished during WWII or the post war drawdown.
FAW-15		FAW-15: 1 Dec 1942-28 Jul 1945	Disestablished during WWII or the post war drawdown.
FAW-16		FAW-16: 16 Feb 1943-27 Jun 1945	Disestablished during WWII or the post war drawdown.
FAW-17		FAW-17: 15 Sep 1943-2 Jan 1946	Disestablished during WWII or the post war drawdown.
FAW-18		FAW-18: 5 May 1945-30 Jun 1947	Disestablished during WWII or the post war drawdown.
FAW-6(2nd)		FAW-6:(2nd): 4 Aug 1950-1 Jul 1972	Established during the Korean War
FAW-10(2nd)		FAW-10(2nd): 29 Jun 1963-30 Jun 1973	Established in the 1960s
FAW-8(2nd)		FAW-8(2nd): 1 Jul 1965-1 Aug 1972	Established in the 1960s

===== Patrol Wings 30 June 1973 to 1999 =====
On 30 June 1973 Fleet Air Wing 10(2nd) was disestablished leaving only four Fleet Air Wings. Those four on that date were redesignated Patrol Wings. Eight years later in 1981 a new Patrol Wing was established and was designated Patrol Wing TEN(2nd).

Wing	Insignia	Lineage	Notes
PATWING ONE (2nd)		PATWING-1(1st): 1 Oct 1937-1 Nov 1942; FAW-1: 1 Nov 1942-30 Jun 1973; PATWING-1(2nd): 30 Jun 1973-1 Jun 1999; PATRECONWING-1: 1 Jun 1999-present	NSF Kamiseya, Japan (Note: On 30 June 1973 the wing was based at NAF Naha, Okinawa A month later it relocated to Naval Support Facility Kamiseya, Japan where it assumed the role of a headquarters staff, with no squadrons permanently assigned which exercised operational control of VP squadrons deployed to 7th Fleet as Commander, Task Force 72. In 1995 when U.S. Fifth Fleet was established to conduct operations in the Middle East, PATWING ONE assumed the same role for 5th Fleet as CTF-57)
PATWING TWO (2nd)		PATWING TWO-2(1st): 1 Oct 1937-1 Nov 1942; FAW-2: 1 Nov 1942-30 Jun 1973; PATWING-2(2nd): 30 Jun 1973-8 Jun 1993	NAS Barbers Point, HI
PATWING FIVE (2nd)		PATWING-5(1st): 1 Oct 1937-1 Nov 1942; FAW-5: 1 Nov 1942-30 Jun 1973; PATWING-5(2nd): 30 Jun 1973-26 Mar 1999; PATRECONWING-5: 26 Mar 1999-2009	NAS Brunswick, ME
PATWING ELEVEN (2nd)	PATWING-11	PATWING-11(1st): 15 Aug 1942-1 Nov 1942; FAW-11: 1 Nov 1942-30 Jun 1973; PATWING-11(2nd): 30 Jun 1973-26 Mar 1999; PATRECONWING-11: 26 Mar 1999-present	NAS Jacksonville, FL
PATWING TEN (2nd)	(Note: Though this wing's insignia is based on that of Fleet Air Wing 10 it does not share a lineage with either the first Patrol Wing 10 which was disestablished as Fleet Air Wing 10(1st) on 7 June 1947 or with the second Fleet Air Wing 10 which was disestablished eight years prior to the establishment of this wing)	PATWING-10(2nd): 1 Jun 1981-1 Jun 1999; PATRECONWING-10: 1 Jun 1999-present	NAS Moffett Field, CA; Moved on 1 July 1994 to NAS Whidbey Is, WA

===== Patrol and Reconnaissance Wings 1999 and later =====
In 1999 there were four Patrol Wings still in existence and on that date they were redesignated Patrol and Reconnaissance Wings. Four years later in 2003 a fifth Patrol and Reconnaissance Wing was established and designated Patrol and Reconnaissance Wing TWO.

Wing	Insignia	Lineage	Notes
PATRECONWING; ONE		PATWING-1(1st): 1 Oct 1937-1 Nov 1942; FAW-1: 1 Nov 1942-30 Jun 1973; PATWING-1(2nd): 30 Jun 1973-1 Jun 1999; PATRECONWING-1: 1 Jun 1999-present	NSF Kamiseya, Japan; NAF Misawa, Japan; NAF Atsugi, Japan; A Commander and staff only with no assigned squadrons. Exercises Operational Control of rotational VP squadrons deployed to 7th Fleet.
PATRECONWING; FIVE		PATWING-5(1st): 1 Oct 1937-1 Nov 1942; FAW-5: 1 Nov 1942-30 Jun 1973; PATWING-5(2nd): 30 Jun 1973-26 Mar 1999; PATRECONWING-5: 26 Mar 1999-2009	NAS Brunswick, ME; When disestablished the wing's remaining squadrons were realigned to PATRECONWING ELEVEN
PATRECONWING; TEN		PATWING-10(2nd): 1 Jun 1981-1 Jun 1999; PATRECONWING-10: 1 Jun 1999-present	NAS Whidbey Is, WA
PATRECONWING; ELEVEN		PATWING-11(1st): 15 Aug 1942-1 Nov 1942; FAW-11: 1 Nov 1942-30 Jun 1973; PATWING-11(2nd): 30 Jun 1973-26 Mar 1999; PATRECONWING-11: 26 Mar 1999-present	NAS Jacksonville, FL
PATRECONWING; TWO	(Note: adopted the insignia from the previously disestablished Patrol Wing TWO. This wing does not share a lineage with the former Patrol Wing TWO as that wing was disestablished ten years before the establishment of this wing.)	PATRECONWING-2: Oct 2003-1 May 2017	MCAS Kaneohe Bay, HI; When disestablished the wing's remaining squadrons were realigned to PATRECONWING TEN

===== Navy Reserve Fleet Air and Patrol Wings 1970-2007 =====
In 1970 the USNR created a wing structure with the establishment of two Fleet Air Reserve Wings (FARW), two Reserve Carrier Air Wings (CVWR) and two Reserve Anti-Submarine Carrier Air Groups (CVSGR). The CVWRs and CVSGRs are detailed in the "Other Functional Wings and Type Wings" section at the end of the article.

Naval Air Reserve Fleet Air Reserve Wings 1970 to 1973

Wing	Insignia	Lineage	Composition	Notes
FARW PAC (Note: Fleet Air Reserve Wing Pacific)		FARW PAC: 1 Oct 1970-1973; RESPATWINGPAC: (Note: Reserve Patrol Wing Pacific) 1973-Jan 1999	West Coast USNR VP sqdns	
FARW LANT (Note: Fleet Air Reserve Wing Atlantic)		FARW LANT: 1 Oct 1970-1973; RESPATWINGLANT: (Note: Reserve Patrol Wing Atlantic) 1973-Jan 1999	East Coast USNR VP sqdns	

Fleet Air Reserve Wings were redesignated Reserve Patrol Wings at the same time that the active component FAWs were redesigned Patrol Wings.

Naval Air Reserve Patrol Wings 1973 to 2007

Wing	Insignia	Lineage	Composition	Notes
RESPATWINPAC/ PATWING FOUR(2nd) (Note: Reserve Patrol Wing Pacific (dual designated as Patrol Wing FOUR))		FARW PAC: 1 Oct 1970-1973; RESPATWINGPAC: 1973-Jan 1999	West Coast USNR VP sqdns	Staff merged with staff of RESPATWINGLANT after disestablishment to form RESPATWING
RESPATWINGLANT (Note: Reserve Patrol Wing Atlantic)		FARW LANT: 1 Oct 1970-1973; RESPATWINGLANT: 1973-Jan 1999	East Coast USNR VP sqdns	Staff merged with staff of RESPATWINGPAC after disestablishment to form RESPATWING
RESPATWING (Note: Reserve Patrol Wing) (Note: This wing retained the "PATWING" designation when in March and June of 1999 the active component PATWINGS were redesignated PATRECONWINGs)		RESPATWING: Jan 1999-30 Jun 2007	All USNR VP sqdns	Single PATWING to control the four USNR VP Squadrons remaining after disestablishment of the majority of USNR squadrons. (Note: when this wing was disestablished in 2007 the remaining USNR VP Squadrons were realigned under Active Duty Patrol and Reconnaissance Wings)

==== Other Functional Wings and Type Wings 1951 to present ====
The tables in this section list disestablished wings as well as former no longer used designations of current Type Wings. They do not include Fleet Air Wings, Patrol Wings or Patrol and Reconnaissance Wings as they are included in the "Patrol, Fleet Air, and Patrol and Reconnaissance Wings" tables above.

The Navy's first "type wings" were established in the 1950s to provide for the training and readiness of nuclear bomber (Heavy Attack - VAH) squadrons assigned to Carrier Air Groups. In 1967 and 1968 three more such wings were established for the training and readiness of squadrons of specialized aircraft equipped with the emerging technologies of airborne search radar (Carrier Airborne Early Warning - VAW) and electronic warfare (Tactical Electronic Warfare - VAQ). Beginning in 1970 the type wing concept was expanded in the Atlantic Fleet to include by 1973 all squadrons of Carrier Air Wing type aircraft. It was another two decades after that before the Pacific Fleet adopted a type wing organization.

===== Special Mission Wings 1951 to 1973 =====
Carrier Air Groups when not embarked in their aircraft carriers were based at Naval Air Stations. From as early as WWII those air groups and the Naval Air Stations at which they were based, along with all the facilities and infrastructure to support them, all fell under the overall command of a Rear Admiral commanded "Fleet Air" command (Fleet Air West Coast, Fleet Air Norfolk, Fleet Air Seattle, etc.). Fleet Air commands ensured Carrier Air Groups were equipped, trained, crewed and ready to deploy aboard their aircraft carriers and they managed the entire shore infrastructure necessary for doing so.

In the 1950s the Navy began attaching nuclear bomber squadrons (Heavy Attack Squadron – VAH) to deploying Carrier Air Groups. Because of the specialized nature of the nuclear bombing mission and its unique training and readiness needs, "Heavy Attack Wings" were established under Fleet Air commands to provide the specialized training and upkeep of the aircraft required for the safe and effective conduct of this critical mission. These Heavy Attack Wings were not deployable wings, instead they provided combat ready VAH squadrons to deploying Carrier Air Groups. At the same time, Carrier Airborne Early Warning (VAW) squadrons 11 and 12 were providing detachments of aircraft equipped with the emerging technologies of airborne search radar and electronic warfare systems to deploying Carrier Air Groups, and in 1959 a third VAW squadron (VAW-13) split out of VAW-11 to concentrate on electronic warfare. By 1967 VAW-11 and VAW-12 had grown so large that they were elevated to wing status and designated Carrier Airborne Early Warning Wings ELEVEN and TWELVE and their detachments were established as squadrons. In 1968 Tactical Electronic Warfare Wing THIRTEEN was established to manage the training and readiness of Tactical Electronic Warfare (VAQ) squadrons which were being established.

These "special mission" Heavy Attack, Carrier Airborne Early Warning, and Electronic Warfare wings were non-deploying "force providers" which ensured their squadrons were ready and capable of executing their unique roles when attached to a Carrier Air Group (Carrier Air Wing after December 1963) for deployment making them the first of what are now called "type wings."

Naval Air Force Atlantic special mission wings 1951 to 1970

Wing	Insignia	Lineage	Composition	Notes
HATWING (Note: Heavy Attack Wing); ONE; RECONATKWING (Note: Reconnaissance Attack Wing); ONE		HATWING-1: 1 Feb 1951-Aug 1964 RECONATKWING-1:Aug 1964-1 Jan 1980	VAH squadrons (Note: Heavy Attack (VAH) squadrons flew nuclear bomber AJ aircraft. Squadrons ultimately transitioned to A-3 then A-5 aircraft)	Provided VAH squadrons to Carrier Air Groups. (Note: In August 1964 the Navy ended its involvement in strategic nuclear bombing in favor of developing its submarine launched ballistic missile force and converted its A-5 Vigilante nuclear bomber squadrons (VAH) to RA-5C Vigilante reconnaissance squadrons (RVAH) and HATWING ONE was redesignated RECONATKWING ONE)
HATWING; ONE; RECONATKWING; ONE		HATWING-1: 1 Feb 1951-Aug 1964 RECONATKWING-1:Aug 1964-1 Jan 1980	RVAH squadrons (Note: Reconnaissance Attack (RVAH) squadrons flew RA-5C Vigilante photographic reconnaissance aircraft)	Provided RVAH squadrons to Carrier Air Wings. (Note: Disestablished 7 Jan 1980 with the retirement of the RA-5C Vigilante and disestablishment of RVAH squadrons.)
CAEWWING (Note: Carrier Airborne Early Warning Wing); TWELVE		CAEWWING-12: 1 Apr 1967-1 Sep 1993; AEWWINGLANT: 1 Sep 1993-23 Sep 2005	VAW squadrons (Note: Carrier Airborne Early Warning (VAW) squadrons)	Established when VAW-12 was elevated to wing status and its detachments were established as separate squadrons.

Naval Air Force Pacific special mission wings 1956 to 1973

Wing	Insignia	Lineage	Composition	Notes
HATWING (Note: Heavy Attack Wing); TWO		HATWING-2: 2 July 1956-30 Jun 1959	VAH squadrons (Note: Heavy Attack (VAH) squadrons flew nuclear bomber A-3 aircraft)	Provided VAH squadrons to Carrier Air Groups. Squadrons realigned under Fleet Air Whidbey after disestablishment.
CAEWWING (Note: Carrier Airborne Early Warning Wing); ELEVEN		CAEWWING-11: 20 Apr 1967-30 Jun 1973	VAW squadrons (Note: Carrier Airborne Early Warning (VAW) squadrons)	Established when VAW-11 was elevated to wing status and its detachments were established as separate squadrons. Squadrons realigned under Fleet Air Miramar after disestablishment.
VAQWING (Note: Tactical Electronic Warfare Wing); THIRTEEN		VAQWING-13: 1 Sep 1968-1 Jul 1972	VAQ squadrons (Note: Tactical Electronic Warfare (VAQ) squadrons flew the EKA-3B Skywarrior and provided detachments to Carrier Air Wings)	Established at NAS Alameda to oversee administrative, operations and maintenance support for the new Tactical Electronic Warfare (VAQ) squadrons Moved to NAS Whidbey Island with the decision to base the new EA-6B Prowler squadrons at NASWI. Squadrons realigned under Fleet Air Whidbey after disestablishment.

===== Functional and Type Wings 1970 to 1993 =====
Between 1970 and 1974 both Naval Air Force Pacific Fleet and Naval Air Force Atlantic Fleet underwent reorganizations which replaced Fleet Air commands with wings. Though both fleets each ended up with a wing structure, they went about their reorganizations differently and each ended up with different structures. Naval Air Force Pacific Fleet simply redesignated Flag Officer commanded Fleet Air commands as functional wings essentially leaving the Fleet Air structure in place with a simple name change to wings while Naval Air Force Atlantic Fleet created a two tiered wing structure consisting of Flag Officer commanded functional wings with subordinate type wings commanded by Captains. The Functional Wing Commanders reported to the Commander, Naval Air Force Atlantic Fleet, commanded the former Fleet Air command Naval Air Stations and shore infrastructure and oversaw their subordinate Captain commanded type wings which were directly responsible for the aircraft squadrons.

Naval Air Force Pacific Functional Wings 1973 to 1993. Naval Air Force Pacific Fleet's reorganization began on 30 June 1973 when its single remaining special mission wing (CAEWWING 11) and all but five of its Fleet Air commands were disestablished. The next day, 1 July 1973 the five remaining Fleet Air commands; Fleet Air Miramar, Fleet Air Lemoore, Fleet Air Whidbey, Fleet Air San Diego and Fleet Air Moffett, were renamed wings resulting in a wing structure consisting of five Flag Officer commanded functional wings. These wings continued operating as they had operated when they were Fleet Air commands with responsibility for their assigned Naval Air Stations and aircraft squadrons. They also retained direct control of the Fleet Replacement Squadrons for their assigned aircraft which had been attached to Readiness Carrier Air Wing TWELVE (RCVW-12) or to Readiness Carrier Antisubmarine Group FIFTY ONE (RCVSG-51) both of which had been disestablished on 30 June 1970. Of the five wings only Patrol Wings, Pacific had subordinate wings which were Patrol Wings ONE and TWO both of them having been in existence since 1937.

Wing	Insignia	Lineage	Composition	Notes
FITAEWWINGPAC (Note: Fighter Airborne Early Warning Wing, Pacific or Fighter AEW Wing, Pacific)		FITAEWWINGPAC: 1 Jul 1973-30 Sep 1993	VF squadrons (Note: Fighter squadrons flying the F-4 replaced by the F-14 by the mid 1980s); VAW squadrons (Note: Carrier Airborne Early Warning squadrons flying the E-2); NAS Miramar	Fleet Air Miramar renamed Fighter AEW Wing, Pacific on 1 July 1973.
LATWINGPAC (Note: Light Attack Wing, Pacific) STRIKEFITWINGPAC (Note: Strike Fighter Wing, Pacific)		LATWINGPAC:1 Jul 1973-5 Apr 1991 STRIKEFITWINGPAC: 5 Apr 1991-1 Jun 1993 (Note: On 1 June 1993 this Flag Officer commanded Functional Wing ceased operating as such and it was converted to a Captain commanded type wing. That Captain commanded type wing still exists)	VA squadrons (Note: Attack (VA) squadrons flying the "light attack" A-7 aircraft); NAS Lemoore; NAS Fallon	Fleet Air Lemoore renamed LATWINGPAC on 1 Jul 1973. Redesignated STRIKEFITWINGPAC on 5 April 1991. (Note: Thought the Flag Officer commanded functional wing no longer exists the wing does still exist as the Captain commanded Type Wing STRIKEFITWINGPAC)
LATWINGPAC STRIKEFITWINGPAC		LATWINGPAC:1 Jul 1973-5 Apr 1991 STRIKEFITWINGPAC: 5 Apr 1991-1 Jun 1993	VFA squadrons (Note: Fighter Attack (VFA) squadrons until 1993 then Strike Fighter (VFA) squadrons. Flew the F/A-18 Hornet); NAS Lemoore; NAS Fallon	Fleet Air Lemoore renamed LATWINGPAC on 1 Jul 1973. Redesignated STRIKEFITWINGPAC on 5 April 1991.
MATVAQWINGPAC (Note: Medium Attack Tactical Electronic Warfare Wing, Pacific)		MATVAQWINGPAC: 1 Jul 1973-31 Jan 1993	VA squadrons (Note: Attack (VA) squadrons flying the "medium attack" A-6 Intruder aircraft); VAQ squadrons (Note: Tactical Electronic Warfare (VAQ) squadrons flying the EA-6B Prowler); NAS Whidbey Island	Fleet Air Whidbey renamed MATVAQWINGPAC on 1 July 1973.
ASWWINGPAC (Note: Anti-Submarine Warfare Wing, Pacific)		ASWWINGPAC: 1 Jul 1973-30 Sep 1993	VS squadrons (Note: Air Antisubmarine (VS) squadrons flew the S-2 Tracker transitioning to the S-3 Viking before 1980); HS squadrons (Note: Helicopter Antisubmarine (HS) squadrons flew the SH-3 Sea King. Squadrons began transition to the SH-60F and HH-60H Seahawk in the 1990s); HSL squadrons (Note: Helicopter Antisubmarine (Light) (HSL) squadrons flew the SH-2 Sea Sprite or beginning in the mid 1980s the then new SH-60B Seahawk from Cruisers, Destroyers and Frigates); HC squadrons (Note: Helicopter Combat Support (HC) squadrons (logistics squadrons) flew the CH-46 Sea Knight or UH-3 Sea King); HM squadrons (Note: Helicopter Mine Countermeasures (HM) squadrons flew the MH-53 Sea Stallion); VRC squadrons (Note: Fleet Logistics Support (VRC) squadrons flew the C-2 Greyhound); VR squadrons (Note: Fleet Logistics Support (VR) squadrons flying various passenger and cargo aircraft); NAS North Island; NALF Imperial Beach	Fleet Air San Diego renamed ASWWINGPAC on 1 July 1973.
PATWINGSPAC (Note: Patrol Wings, Pacific)		FAWWINGSPAC: (Note: Fleet Air Wings, Pacific (was also "dual hatted" as Fleet Air Moffett)) ????-1 Jul 1973; PATWINGSPAC: 1 Jul 1973-????	PATWING ONE; PATWING TWO; PATWING TEN (Note: established in 1981); NAS Moffett Field; NAF Adak	Commander Fleet Air Wings Pacific/Fleet Air Moffett renamed Patrol Wings Pacific on 1 July 1973.

Naval Air Force Atlantic Functional Wings 1974 to 1993. On 1 July 1974 Naval Air Force Atlantic Fleet completed the replacement of its Fleet Air commands by realigning three existing Flag Officer commands redesignating them as functional wings which assumed command of Atlantic Fleet Naval Air Stations and of eight type wings which had been established between 1970 and 1973 in advance of the Flag Officer functional wings. A fourth functional wing was established twelve years later in 1986.

Wing	Insignia	Lineage	Composition	Notes
TACWINGSLANT (Note: Tactical Wings, Atlantic); FITMATAEWWINGSLANT (Note: Fighter, Medium Attack, Airborne Early Warning Wings, Atlantic); TACWINGSLANT (Note: redesignated back to "Tactical Wings, Atlantic after two and a half years)		TACWINGSLANT: 1 Jul 1974-1 Oct 1986; FITMATAEWWINGSLANT: 1 Oct 1986-27 Apr 1989; TACWINGSLANT: 27 Apr 1989-30 Sep 1992	RECONATKWING ONE (Note: until its disestablishment on 7 Jun 1980); CAEWWING TWELVE; LATWING ONE (Note: Until 1 Oct 1986 when it was moved to the newly established STRIKEFITWINGSLANT); FITWING ONE; MATWING ONE; NAS Oceana; NAS Key West (Note: Until 1 Oct 1986 when it was moved to the newly established STRIKEFITWINGSLANT); NAS Norfolk	(Note: In 1971 Fleet Air Norfolk was absorbed into the staff of Commander, Naval Air Force Atlantic. On 1 Apr 1973 the Deputy Commander, Naval Air Force Atlantic/Commander Tactical Air, Atlantic assumed the former Fleet Air Norfolk responsibilities and on 1 July 1974 was designated "Commander Tactical Wings, Atlantic." The wing was redesignated "Fighter, Medium Attack, Airborne Early Warning Wings Atlantic" (FITMATAEWWINGSLANT) on 1 October 1986 but it was changed back to TACWINGSLANT two and a half years later)
SEABASEDASWWINGSLANT (Note: Sea Based Anti-Submarine Warfare Wings, Atlantic. This wing was colloquially called "Sea Bear") HELWINGSLANT (Note: Helicopter Wings, Atlantic)		SEABASEDASWWINGSLANT: 1 Jul 1974-1 Oct 1986; HELWINGSLANT: 1 Oct 1986-30 Sep 1992	AIRANTISUBWING ONE (Note: Transferred to STRIKEFITWINGSLANT on 1 October 1986 when SEABASEDASWWINGSLANT was redesignated HELWINGSLANT); HELANTISUBWING ONE; HELSEACONWING ONE; HELSEACONWING THREE (Note: This wing was established in Mar 1985 and added upon its establishment); NAS Jacksonville; NAS Cecil Field (Note: Transferred to STRIKEFITWINGSLANT when it was established on 1 October 1986); NS Mayport	(Note: Deputy Commander Naval Air Force Atlantic/Commander Sea Control Group One was designated "Commander Sea Based Anti-Submarine Warfare Wings, Atlantic" on 1 Jul 1974 replacing Fleet Air Jacksonville which was disestablished. "Commander Sea Based Anti-Submarine Warfare Wings, Atlantic" was redesignated "Commander Helicopter Wings, Atlantic" on 1 Oct 1986 transferring AIRASWWING ONE and NAS Cecil Field to the newly established Strike-Fighter Wings, Atlantic and receiving Helicopter Tactical Wing ONE into the wing)
SEABASEDASWWINGSLANT HELWINGSLANT		SEABASEDASWWINGSLANT: 1 Jul 1974-1 Oct 1986; HELWINGSLANT: 1 Oct 1986-30 Sep 1992	HELANTISUBWING ONE; HELSEACONWING ONE (Note: until its disestablishment on 1 Jul 1992); HELSEACONWING THREE (Note: redesignated HSLWING ONE on 1 Jul 1992); HELTACWING ONE (Note: added upon SEABASEDASWWINGSLANT redesignation to HELWINGSLANT); NAS Jacksonville; NS Mayport; NAS Mayport (Note: In 1988 the airfield at Naval Station Mayport was established as a separate command called NAS Mayport)	
PATWINGSLANT (Note: Patrol Wings, Atlantic)		PATWINGSLANT: 1 Jul 1974-30 Sep 1992	PATWING FIVE; PATWING ELEVEN; NAS Brunswick; NAS Bermuda; NAF Lajes, Azors	(Note: Fleet Air Brunswick/Commander Patrol Wings, Atlantic was redesignated Commander Patrol Wings, Atlantic/Commander Patrol Wing FIVE in Jul 1973. On 1 July 1974 Commander Patrol Wings, Atlantic and Patrol Wing FIVE separated into separate commands with Patrol Wings Atlantic (PATWINGSLANT) being the third Naval Air Force functional wing with Patrol Wing FIVE being one of its subordinate wings. "Patrol Wings Atlantic" was disestablished on 30 Sep 1992. A new Commander Patrol Wings, Atlantic was established two years later in Oct 1994 which exists today as Commander Patrol and Reconnaissance Group/Commander Patrol and Reconnaissance Group Pacific.)
STRIKEFITWINGSLANT (Note: Strike-Fighter Wings, Atlantic)		STRIKEFITWINGSLANT: 1 Oct 1986-30 Sep 1992	LATWING ONE (Note: transferred from TACWINGSLANT) (Note: This wing was redesignated "Strike Fighter Wing Atlantic" on 1 September 1993); SEASTRIKEWING ONE (Note: AIRANTISUBWING ONE transferred from SEABASEDASWWINGSLANT and was redesignated "Sea Strike Wing ONE"); NAS Cecil Field (Note: Transferred from SEABASEDASWWINGSLANT); NAS Key West (Note: Transferred from TACWINGSLANT)	(Note: Established 1 Oct 1986 by transferring LATWING ONE and NAS Key West from TACWINGSLANT and NAS Cecil Field and AIRASWWING ONE from SEABASEDASWWINGSLANT) (Note: Note: This wing "Strike-Fighter Wings, Atlantic" and the future "Strike Fighter Wing, Atlantic" are two separate wings. This wing was a Flag Officer commanded functional wing which existed for only six years from 1986 to 1992 and the other is a Captain commanded type wing established in 1970 as Light Attack Wing ONE (LATWING ONE) and redesignated Strike Fighter Wing, Atlantic in 1993 and which still exists today as Strike Fighter Wing, Atlantic. That type wing was a subordinate wing of this functional wing from 1986 to 1992)

Naval Air Force Atlantic Type Wings 1970 to 1993. Naval Air Force Atlantic Fleet's reorganization began in 1970 when the first of six new Captain commanded type wings was established to join the two special mission wings (CAEWWING TWELVE and RECONATKWING ONE) already in existence. Two more new type wings were established in 1971 and three more in 1973. A final type wing was established in 1985 with the introduction of a new aircraft type. The Type Wings were commanded by Captains and consisted of squadrons of a single type of aircraft (fighter, attack, anti-submarine). These wings would assist in maintenance and equipment support providing operationally ready squadrons to Carrier Air Wings or other operating forces and supervise training when the squadrons were not deployed. They would also take control of the Fleet Replacement Squadron for their type aircraft which had been attached to Readiness Carrier Air Wing FOUR (RCVW-4) which was disestablished on 1 June 1970 or to Readiness Carrier Antisubmarine Group FIFTY (RCVSG-50) which was disestablished on 17 February 1971.

Wing	Insignia	Lineage	Composition	Notes
CAEWWING (Note: Carrier Airborne Early Warning Wing); TWELVE		CAEWWING-12: 1 Apr 1967-1 Sep 1993; AEWWINGLANT: 1 Sep 1993-23 Sep 2005	Carrier Airborne Early Warning (VAW) squadrons (Note: after 1 Oct 1989 the wing also included Fleet Logistics Support Squadron 40 which flew the C-2A COD when FLTTACSUPWING ONE was disetatablished and VRC-40 was transferred from it to this wing)	Assigned to TACWINGSLANT
RECONATKWING (Note: Reconnaissance Attack Wing); ONE		HATWING-1: 1 Feb 1951-Aug 1964; RECONATKWING-1: Aug 1964-1 Jan 1980	Reconnaissance Attack (RVAH) squadrons	Assigned to TACWINGSLANT; Disestablished 7 Jan 1980 with the retirement of the RA-5C Vigilante and disestablishment of RVAH squadrons
LATWING (Note: Light Attack Wing); ONE		LATWING-1: 1 Jun 1970-1 Sep 1993; STRIKEFITWINGLANT: 1 Sep 1993–present	Attack (VA) squadrons (Note: Attack squadrons flying the "light attack" A-7 aircraft) (Note: squadrons transitioned from the A-7 to the F/A-18 and were redeisgnated Fighter Attack (VFA) (later Strike Fighter (VFA)) squadrons beginning in the late 1980s)	Assigned to TACWINGSLANT Transferred to STRIKEFITWINGSLANT on 1 Oct 1986
FITWING (Note: Fighter Wing); ONE		FITWING-1: 16 Jul 1971-1 Sep 1993; FITWINGLANT: 1 Sep 1993-1 Oct 2004	Fighter (VF) squadrons (Note: flying the F-4 which was replaced during the 1970s by the F-14)	Assigned to TACWINGSLANT
MATWING (Note: Medium Attack Wing); ONE		MATWING-1: 1 Oct 1971-1 Sep 1993; ATKWINGLANT: 1 Sep 1993-30 Jun 1997	Attack (VA) squadrons (Note: Attack (VA) squadrons flying the "medium attack" A-6 Intruder aircraft)	Assigned to TACWINGSLANT
AIRANTISUBWING (Note: Air Anti-Submarine Wing); ONE SEASTRKWING (Note: Sea Strike Wing); ONE	VS Wing ONE	AIRANTISUBWING-1: 1 Apr 1973-May 1987; SEASTRKWING-1: May 1987-1 Sep 1993; SEACONWINGLANT: 1 Sep 1993-30 Jan 2009	Air Antisubmarine (VS) squadrons (Note: Squadrons flew the S-2 Tracker transitioning to the S-3 Viking before 1980)	Assigned to SEABASEDASWWINGSLANT Transferred to STRIKEFITWINGSLANT on 1 Oct 1986 and redesignated SEASTRKWING ONE
HELANTISUBWING (Note: Helicopter Anti-Submarine Wing); ONE		HELANTISUBWING-1: 1 Apr 1973-1 Sep 1993; HELANTISUBWINGLANT: 1 Sep 1993-1 Apr 2005	Helicopter Antisubmarine (HS) squadrons (Note: squadrons flew the SH-3 Sea King. Squadrons began transition to the SH-60F and HH-60H Seahawk in the 1990s)	Assigned to SEABASEDASWWINGSLANT (SEABASEDASWWINGSLANT became HELWINGSLANT on 1 Oct 1986)
HELSEACONWING (Note: Helicopter Sea Control Wing); ONE		HELSEACONWING-1: Jun 1973-1 Jul 1992	Helicopter Antisubmarine (Light) (HSL) squadrons (Note: squadrons flew the SH-2 Sea Sprite from Cruisers, Destroyers and Frigates) (Note: squadrons re-aligned under Helicopter Anti-Submarine (Light) Wing ONE (HSLWING ONE) upon the wing's disestablishment); Helicopter Mine Countermeasures (HM) squadrons (Note: RH-53D later MH-53E minesweeping helicopters) (Note: squadrons moved to HELTACWING ONE when it was established on 1 Oct 1982)	Assigned to SEABASEDASWWINGSLANT (SEABASEDASWWINGSLANT became HELWINGSLANT on 1 Oct 1986) Disestablished 1 Jul 1992 as part of the retirement of the SH-2 Sea Sprite
HELSEACONWING (Note: Helicopter Sea Control Wing); THREE HSLWING (Note: Helicopter Antisubmarine (Light) Wing); ONE	HELSEACONWING THREE	HELSEACONWING-3: Mar 1985-1 Jul 1992; HSLWING-1: 1 Jul 1992-1 Sep 1993; HSLWINGLANT: 1 Sep 1993-1 Jul 2006; HSMWINGLANT: 1 Jul 2006-present	Helicopter Antisubmarine (Light) (HSL) squadrons (Note: Squadrons flying the then new SH-60B Seahawk. After 1 July 1992 also included squadrons realigned from the disestablished HELSEACONWING ONE still flying the SH-2 Sea Sprite until the SH-2 to SH-60B transition was complete)	Assigned to SEABASEDASWWINGSLANT (SEABASEDASWWINGSLANT became HELWINGSLANT on 1 Oct 1986)

Naval Air Force Atlantic logistics functional wings 1973 to 1993. In 1973 a wing was established as a Captain commanded functional wing consisting of nine squadrons of various types of fixed wing aircraft and helicopters to command the Atlantic Fleet's logistics, utility and other support aircraft squadrons and in 1982 a Captain commanded helicopter functional wing was established to organize logistics, mine countermeasures and utility squadrons.

Wing	Insignia	Lineage	Composition	Notes
FLTTACSUPWING (Note: Fleet Tactical Support Wing); ONE		FLTTACSUPWING-1: 1 Jul 1973-1 Oct 1989	Fixed wing, helicopter and drone utility and logistics squadrons (Note: There were at least fourteen squadrons which belonged to the wing for some period of its existence. It was established with nine squadrons and disestablished with nine squadrons but only four of them had been in the wing since its establishment)	Reported directly to Commander, Naval Air Force Atlantic Fleet (CNAL) (Note: Its squadrons were reassigned to six different wings or organizations on its disestablishment)
HELTACWING (Note: Helicopter Tactical Wing); ONE		HELTACWING-1: 1 Oct 1982-1 Sep 1993; HELTACWINGLANT: 1 Sep 1993-1 Apr 2005; HSCWINGLANT: 1 Apr 2005-present	Helicopter logistics, mine countermeasures and utility squadrons (Note: Established 1 Oct 1982 from Fleet Tactical Support Wing ONE's Helicopter squadron, a Naval Air Training Command helicopter squadron supporting training command activities and three Helicopter Mine Countermeasures (HM) squadrons from Helicopter Sea Control Wing ONE.)	Reported directly to CNAL until 1 Oct 1986 when it was realigned under HELWINGSLANT

===== Type Wings 1993 to 2009 =====
In 1993 both Naval Air Force Pacific Fleet and Naval Air Force Atlantic Fleet underwent major reorganization as part of a larger Navy reorganization that began moving command of the shore establishment away from the operating forces. All Flag Officer commanded Functional Wings were disestablished and command of Naval Air Stations and other shore based infrastructure was moved to Flag Officer commands in a chain of command separate from that of aircraft wings. Naval Air Force Pacific Fleet established type wings (Note: On 31 Jan 1993 MATVAQWINGPAC was disestablished and Attack Wing, Pacific (ATTKWINGPAC) and Electronic Combat Wing, Pacific (VAQWINGPAC) were established the next day. On 1 June 1993 Strike Fighter Wing, Pacific gave up command of its Naval Air Stations, the Flag Officer commander was replaced by a captain and it shifted from being a functional wing to being a type wing. From April to July 1993 Sea Control Wing, Pacific (SEACONWINGPAC); Helicopter Anti-Submarine (Light) Wing, Pacific (HSLWINGPAC); Helicopter Anti-Submarine Wing, Pacific (HSWINPAC) and Helicopter Tactical Wing, Pacific (HELTACWINGPAC) were established in advance of ASWWINGSPAC's disestablishment on 30 September 1993. Finally on 1 August 1993 Fighter Wing, Pacific (FITWINGPAC) and Airborne Early Warning Wing, Pacific (AEWWINGPAC) were established in advance of FITAEWWINGPAC's disestablishment on 30 September 1993.) which mirrored those of Naval Air Force Atlantic Fleet and all type wing commanders reported directly to either the Commander, Naval Air Force Pacific Fleet or Commander, Naval Air force Atlantic Fleet.

Naval Air Force Atlantic and Naval Air Force Pacific wings 1993 to 2009. A uniform type wing structure was created across both fleets with wings designated AEWWINGLANT & AEWWINGPAC, HSWINGLANT & HSWINGPAC, FITWINGLANT & FITWINGPAC etc.... The exception to this balanced organization was Electronic Combat Wing, Pacific (VAQWINGPAC) which had no Atlantic Fleet counterpart as there had never been an Electronic Warfare Wing in the Atlantic Fleet as MATVAQWINGPAC had provided VAQ squadrons to both Pacific and Atlantic Fleet Carrier Air Wings.

Wing	Insignia	Lineage	Composition	Notes
*VAQWINGPAC (Note: Electronic Combat Wing, Pacific until 30 March 1998. After 30 March 1998 VAQWINGPAC designated "Electronic Attack Wing Pacific")		VAQWINGPAC: 1 Feb 1993–present	VAQ squadrons (Note: Tactical Electronic Warfare (VAQ) until 30 March 1998 then Electronic Attack (VAQ)) (Note: EA-6B Prowler replaced by EA-18G Growler beginning 2008)	Established to receive the disestablished MATVAQWINGPAC's Tactical Electronic Warfare (VAQ) squadrons.
ATKWINGPAC (Note: Attack Wing, Pacific)		ATKWINGPAC: 1 Feb 1993-30 Apr 1997	VA squadrons (Note: Attack) (Note: A-6 Intruder/KA-6 Intruder)	Established to receive the disestablished MATVAQWINGPAC's Attack (VA) squadrons. Disestablished with the retirement of the A-6E Intruder.
ATKWINGLANT (Note: Attack Wing, Atlantic)		MATWING-1: 1 Oct 1971-1 Sep 1993; ATKWINGLANT: 1 Sep 1993-30 Jun 1997	VA squadrons	Redesignation of Medium Attack Wing ONE. Disestablished with the retirement of the A-6 Intruder.
FITWINGPAC (Note: Fighter Wing, Pacific)		FITWINGPAC: 1 Aug 1993-17 Dec 1996	VF squadrons (Note: Fighter) (Note: F-14 Tomcat)	Established to receive the disestablishing FITAEWWINGPAC's Fighter (VF) squadrons. Disestablished with the retirement of the F-14 Tomcat. (Note: squadrons still remaining when the wing was disestablished were realigned under Fighter Wing, U. S. Atlantic Fleet)
FITWINGLANT (Note: Fighter Wing, Atlantic)		FITWING-1: 16 Jul 1971-1 Sep 1993; FITWINGLANT: 1 Sep 1993-1 Oct 2004	VF squadrons	Redesignation of Fighter Wing ONE. Disestablished with the retirement of the F-14 Tomcat. (Note: Upon disestablishment remaining squadrons realigned under STRKFITWINGLANT and eventually transitioned to the F/A-18F Super Hornet and were redesignated Strike Fighter (VFA) squadrons)
AEWWINGPAC (Note: Airborne Early Warning Wing, Pacific) (2nd) (Note: the first use of the AEWWINGPAC designation was 10 Jan 1956 to 1 Feb 1960. It was a wing of land based early warning aircraft flying the "Pacific Barrier" which was a seaward extension of the nation's DEW Line. That wing and this wing were not related despite the fact they were both identified by the same designation.)		AEWWINGPAC(2nd): 1 Aug 1993-23 Sep 2005; ACCLOGWING: (Note: Airborne Command & Control and Logistics Wing) 23 Sep 2005–present	VAW squadrons (Note: Carrier Airborne Early Warning) (Note: E-2 Hawkeye); VRC squadron (Note: Fleet Logistics Support) (Note: C2A Greyhound)	Established to receive the disestablishing FITAEWWINGPAC's Airborne Early Warning (VAW) squadrons and ASWWINGPAC's Logistics Support (VRC) squadron. Continues to exist today as ACCLOGWING. (Note: Airborne Command & Control and Logistics Wing)
AEWWINGLANT (Note: Airborne Early Warning Wing, Atlantic) (2nd) (Note: the first use of the AEWWINGLANT designation was 1 July 1955 to 26 August 1965. It was a wing of land based early warning aircraft flying the "Atlantic Barrier" which was a seaward extension of the nation's DEW Line. That wing and this wing were not related despite the fact they were both identified by the same designation.)		CAEWWING-12: 1 Apr 1967-1 Sep 1993; AEWWINGLANT(2nd): 1 Sep 1993-23 Sep 2005	VAW squadrons VRC squadron	Resesignation of Carrier Airborne Early Warning Wing TWELVE. On disestablishment squadrons were realigned to AEWWINGPAC which was then redesignated ACCLOGWING.
*STRKFITWINGPAC (Note: Strike Fighter Wing, Pacific)		LATWINGPAC: 1 Jul 1973-5 Apr 1991 (Note: Redesignated Strike Fighter Wing, U.S. Pacific Fleet 5 Apr 1991 with replacement of the A-7 Corsair II by the F/A-18 Hornet in the Pacific Fleet.)STRKFITWINGPAC: 5 Apr 1991–present	VFA squadrons (Note: Strike Fighter) (Note: F/A-18 Hornet replaced by F/A-18 Super Hornet beginning 2001)	Converted from a Flag Officer commanded Functional Wing to a Captain commanded Type Wing on 1 June 1993.
*STRKFITWINGLANT (Note: Strike Fighter Wing, Atlantic)		LATWING-1: 1 Jun 1970-1 Sep 1993; STRKFITWINGLANT: 1 Sep 1993–present	VFA squadrons	Redesignation of Light Attack Wing ONE. (Note: LATWING-1 redesignated with replacement of the A-7 Corsair II by the F/A-18 Hornet in the Atlantic Fleet.)
SEACONWINGPAC (Note: Sea Control Wing, Pacific)		SEACONWINGPAC: 22 Apr 1993-19 Aug 2005	VS squadrons (Note: Air Antisubmarine (VS) squadrons of ASWWINGPAC were redesignated Sea Control (VS) squadrons upon establishment of SEACONWINGPAC) (Note: S-3 Viking); VQ squadron (Note: Fleet Air Reconnaissance) (Note: ES-3A Shadow)	Established to receive Sea Control (VS) squadrons from the disestablishing ASWWINGPAC. Disestablished with the retirement of the S-3 Viking (Note: Squadrons remaining when the wing was disestablished were re-aligned under SECONWINGLANT)
SEACONWINGLANT (Note: Sea Control Wing, Atlantic)		AIRANTISUBWING-1: 1 Apr 1973-May 1987; SEASTRKWING-1: May 1987-1 Sep 1993; SEACONWINGLANT: 1 Sep 1993-30 Jan 2009	VS squadrons (Note: Air Antisbubmarine (VS) squadrons were redesignated Sea Control (VS) squadrons when SEASTRKWING-1 was redesignated SEACONWINGLANT); VQ squadron	Redesignation of Sea Strike Wing ONE. Disestablished with retirement of the S-3 Viking.
HSWINGPAC (Note: Helicopter Antisubmarine Wing, Pacific)		HSWINGPAC: 1 Jul 1993-Apr 2005	HS squadrons (Note: Helicopter Antisubmarine) (Note: SH-60F & HH-60H)	Established to receive Helicopter Anti-Submarine (HS) squadrons from the disestablishing ASWWINGPAC. Disestablished with the retirement of the SH-60F & HH-60H Seahawks (Note: Upon the wing's disestablishment its squadrons were realigned under Helicopter Sea Combat Wing, Pacific in advance of their transitions to the MH-60S Seahawk and redesignation as Helicopter Sea Combat (HSC) squadrons)
HSWINGLANT (Note: Helicopter Antisubmarine Wing, Atlantic)		HSWING-1: 1 Apr 1973-1 Sep 1993; HSWINGLANT: 1 Sep 1993-1 Apr 2005	HS squadrons	Redesignation of Helicopter Anti-submarine Wing ONE. Disestablished with the retirement of the SH-60F & HH-60H Seahawks. (Note: Upon disestablishment squadrons were realigned under Helicopter Sea Combat Wing Atlantic in advance of their transitions to the MH-60S Seahawk and redesignation to Helicopter Sea Combat (HSC) squadrons)
HSLWINGPAC (Note: Helicopter Antisubmarine (Light) Wing, Pacific)		HSLWINGPAC: 5 May 1993-1 Nov 2004; HSMWINGPAC: (Note: Helicopter Maritime Strike Wing, Pacific) 1 Nov 2004–present	HSL squadrons (Note: Helicopter Antisubmarine (Light)) (Note: SH-60B)	Established to receive Helicopter Anti-Submarine (Light) (HSL) squadrons from the disestablishing ASWWINGPAC. Redesignated HSMWINGPAC with transition from the SH-60B Seahawk to the MH-60R Seahawk.
HSLWINGLANT (Note: Helicopter Anti-Submarine (Light) Wing, Atlantic)		HELSEACONWING-3: Mar 1985-1 Jul 1992; HSLWING-1: 1 Jul 1992-1 Sep 1993; HSLWINGLANT: 1 Sep 1993-1 Jul 2006; HSMWINGLANT: (Note: Helicopter Maritime Strike Wing, Atlantic) 1 Jul 2006–present	HSL squadrons	Redesignation of Helicopter Anti-submarine (Light) Wing ONE. Redesignated HSMWINGLANT with transition from the SH-60B Seahawk to the MH-60R Seahawk.
HELTACWINGPAC (Note: Helicopter Tactical Wing, Pacific)		HELTACWINGPAC: 1 Jul 1993-1 Apr 2005; HSCWINGPAC: (Note: Helicopter Sea Combat Wing, Pacific) 1 Apr 2005–present	HC squadrons (Note: Helicopter Combat Support) (Note: Most HC squadrons: CH-46 Sea Knight replaced by MH-60S Seahwak beginning early 2000s. Other HC squadrons: CH-53E or VH-3 or UH-3 logistics or utility helicopters); HM squadrons (Note: Helicopter Mine Countermeasures) (Note: MH-53E Sea Dragon)	Established to receive Helicopter Mine Countermeasures (HM) and Helicopter Combat Support (HC) squadrons from the disestablishing ASWWINGPAC. Redesignated HSCWINGPAC with transition to the MH-60S Seahawk.
HELTACWINGLANT (Note: Helicopter Tactical Wing, Atlantic)		HELTACWING-1: 1 Oct 1982-1 Sep 1993; HELTACWINGLANT: 1 Sep 1993-1 Apr 2005; HSCWINGLANT: (Note: Helicopter Sea Combat Wing, Atlantic) 1 Apr 2005–present	HC squadrons HM squadrons	Redesignation of Helicopter Tactical Wing ONE. Redesignated HSCWINGLANT with transition to the MH-60S Seahawk.

*VAQWINGPAC, STRKFITWINGLANT and STRKFITWINGPAC are not disestablished wings, nor are they former designations of currently active wings. They are included in this table to present a complete picture of the type wing structure as it existed as a result of the 1993 reorganization.

In 1997 the last of ATKWINGLANT & PAC's A-6s were retired and between 2004 and 2009 FITWINGLANT & PAC's F-14s, SEACONWINGLANT & PAC's S-3s and HSWINGLANT & PAC's SH-60Fs and HH-60Hs were retired or were in the final stages of being replaced with new aircraft resulting in the disestablishment of those eight wings, also AEWWINGs LANT & PAC were consolidated into a single wing resulting in a total reduction of nine type wings, down to eight from seventeen, between 1997 and 2009. The eight remaining type wing (plus two more established after 2017) are listed in the current air wings section at the top of the article.

===== Navy Reserve Wings 1970-2007 =====
In 1970 the USNR created a wing structure with the establishment of two Reserve Carrier Air Wings (CVWR), two Reserve Anti-Submarine Carrier Air Groups (CVSGR) and two Fleet Air Reserve Wings (detailed in the Fleet Air Wings section above). All of its Carrier Air Wing type squadrons were attached to a CVWR or CVSGR. CVWRs and CVSGRs were capable of embarking aboard an aircraft carrier for training but their function was to ensure their squadrons were manned, trained and equipped for operational employment if necessary; the same function as that of the active component type wings.

Naval Air Reserve Carrier Air Wings and Antisubmarine Carrier Air Groups

Wing	Insignia	Lineage	Composition	Notes	Tail Code
CVWR-20 (Note: Carrier Air Wing Reserve TWENTY)		CVWR-20: 1 Apr 1970-1 Apr 2007; TSW: (Note: Tactical Support Wing) 1 Apr 2007–present	(2) VF sqdns (3) VA sqdns (1) VAQ sqdn (1) VAW sqdn (1) VFP sqdn (Note: Light Photographic Reconnaissance) (1) VAK sqdn (Note: Tactical Aerial Refueling)	By 2007 the Wing consisted of only one VFA, one VAQ, one VAW and three aggressor sqdns. (Note: two aggressor squadrons had been transferred from FLSW in 1992, the third was established in 2006) It was redesignated Tactical Support Wing (TSW)	AF
CVWR-30 (Note: Carrier Air Wing Reserve THIRTY)		CVWR-30: 1 Apr 1970-31 Dec 1994	(2) VF sqdns (3) VA sqdns (1) VAQ sqdn (Note: Tactical Electronic Warfare) (1) VAW sqdn (1) VFP sqdn (1) VAK sqdn		ND
CVSGR-70 (Note: Antisubmarine Carrier Air Group Reserve SEVENTY)		CVSGR-70: 1 May 1970-30 Jun 1976	(3) VS sqdns (Note: Air Antisubmarine) (2) HS sqdns (1) VAW sqdn (1) VSF sqdn (Note: Antisubmarine Fighter)	When disestablished the VS and VSF sqdns were disestablished, the VAW sqdn moved to CVWR-20 and the HS sqdns to HELWINGRES.	AW
CVSGR-80 (Note: Antisubmarine Carrier Air Group Reserve EIGHTY)		CVSGR-80: 1 May 1970-30 Jul 1976'	(3) VS sqdns (2) HS sqdns (1) VAW sqdn (1) VSF sqdn	When disestablished the VS and VSF sqdns were disestablished, the VAW sqdn moved to CVWR-30 and the HS sqdns to HELWINGRES.	NW

In 1974 the Naval Air Reserve established a wing for its land based logistics squadrons and squadrons which flew fighters as aggressors in support of fleet training. In 1975 it established a helicopter wing to organize its helicopter squadrons in advance of the disestablishment in 1976 of the Anti-Submarine Carrier Air Groups (CVSGR) to which the helicopter squadrons were attached.

Naval Air Reserve Logistics and Helicopter wings

Wing	Insignia	Lineage	Composition	Notes	Tail Code
RESTACSUPWING (Note: Reserve Tactical Support Wing)		RESTACSUPWING: 1974-1983; FLSW: (Note: Fleet Logistics Support Wing) 1983–present	VR sqdns (Note: Fleet Logistics Support); VC sqdns (Note: Fleet Composite (Aggressor squadrons)) (Note: the aggressor squadrons were ultimately transferred to CVWR-20 in 1992 after this wing had been redesignated to FLSW)		
HELWINGRES (Note: Helicopter Wing Reserve)		HELWINGRES: Jun 1975-31 May 2007	(Note: The wing was established with four squadrons, grew to consist of ten squadrons at its maximum size and shrunk to three squadrons by its disestablishment); HS sqdns HSL sqdns HC sqdns HAL sqdns (Note: Helicopter Light Attack); HCS sqnds (Note: Helicopter Combat Support (Special)); HM sqdns	When disestablished the wing consisted of only three sqdns which were realigned under active component wings but continued to display tail code NW. (Note: two of those three squadrons were subsequently deactivated in 2016 and 2023 leaving only a single USNR helicopter squadron still active after 2023)	NW (Note: adopted from the disestablished CVSGR-80)

== See also ==
- List of United States Navy aircraft squadrons
- List of inactive United States Navy aircraft squadrons
- Carrier air wing
- List of wings of the United States Air Force
