= Basilan (disambiguation) =

Basilan may refer to:

== Places ==
- Basilan, officially Province of Basilan, an island province in the Philippines
  - Basilan National Park
  - Basilan State University
  - Basilan Strait

== Other uses ==
- Legislative district of Basilan
- USS Basilan (AG-68), an auxiliary ship acquired by the U.S. Navy during World War II
