= USS Basilan =

Cargo ship of the United States Navy

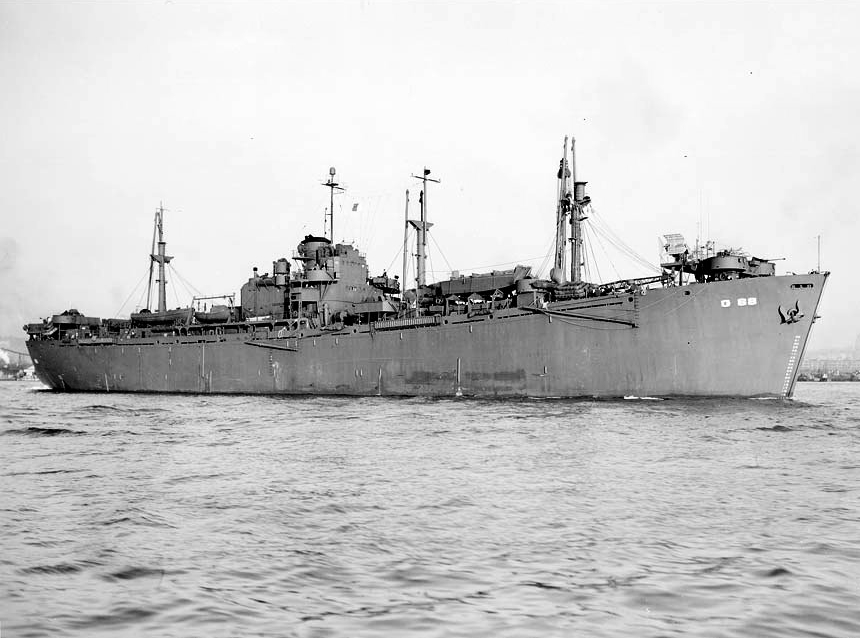
- USS Basilan (AG-68) underway in San Francisco Bay, 27 March 1945, after overhaul.

History

United States
- Name: Jacques Phillipe Villere; Basilan
- Namesake: Jacques Phillipe Villere; The largest of the Basilan islands in the southern Philippines
- Ordered: as Internal Combustion Engine Repair Ship (ARG-12)
- Builder: Delta Shipbuilding Corporation, New Orleans, Louisiana
- Laid down: 5 February 1944, as SS Jacques Phillipe Villere
- Launched: 21 March 1944
- Acquired: by the Navy, 21 April 1944
- Commissioned: 10 October 1944 as USS Basilan (AG-68)
- Decommissioned: 22 April 1946, at Pearl Harbor, Territory of Hawaii
- Reclassified: AG-68, date unknown
- Refit: Waterman Steamship Company, Mobile, Alabama
- Stricken: 28 May 1947
- Fate: sold, 12 June 1972, for scrapping
- Notes: type (EC-2-S-C1) hull, MCE hull 2460

General characteristics
- Type: Basilan-class miscellaneous auxiliary
- Displacement: 5,371 tons light; 14,350 tons full load
- Length: 442 ft (135 m)
- Beam: 57 ft (17 m)
- Draft: 23 ft (7.0 m)
- Propulsion: reciprocating steam engine, single shaft, 1,950hp
- Speed: 13 knots
- Complement: 181 officers and enlisted
- Armament: one single 5 in (130 mm) dual purpose gun mount; four 40 mm AA gun mounts; twelve single 20 mm AA gun mounts

USS Basilan (AG-68) was a Basilan-class miscellaneous auxiliary acquired by the U.S. Navy during World War II. The ship was designed as a combined barracks-stores-water distillation ship, but was later converted to an electronics repair ship. She spent her Navy career in the Pacific Ocean theatre of operations.

== Liberty ship built in New Orleans, Louisiana ==
Basilan was originally projected as the EC-2 "Liberty Ship" Jacques Phillipe Villere—was laid down on 5 February 1944 at New Orleans, Louisiana, by the Delta Shipbuilding Corporation. under a U.S. Maritime Commission contract (MCE hull 2460); redesignated as a miscellaneous auxiliary, AG-68, on 14 March 1944, and allocated for conversion in response to the urgent need for self-propelled special barracks-stores ships; launched on 21 March 1944; and sponsored by Mrs. Percy H. Brown.

Delivered to the Navy on 21 April 1944, Basilan was placed in reduced commission that same day for the voyage from New Orleans to Mobile, Alabama. Placed out of commission at the latter port on 24 April 1944, she underwent conversion for her new role as a combined barracks-stores-distilling ship by the Waterman Steamship Company; and was recommissioned at Mobile on 10 October 1944.

== World War II service ==
=== East coast operations ===
Ordered to proceed to Pilottown, Louisiana, on 21 October, Basilan departed as directed and there joined convoy HK-293 on 22 October. She reached Key West, Florida, on 25 October, joining convoy KN-346 later the same day and proceeding thence to Norfolk, Virginia. Anchoring in Hampton Roads on 31 October, the ship moved into Chesapeake Bay the following morning.

After shakedown training, Basilan entered drydock to undergo repairs and the installation of her evaporators at the Norfolk Navy Yard from 5 to 25 November, after which time she shifted to the Naval Operating Base (NOB), Norfolk, to load supplies.

Underway on the morning of 4 December, Basilan proceeded independently to New York City, arriving at her destination the following afternoon. Proceeding thence in convoy on the afternoon of 7 December, she arrived at Guantánamo Bay, Cuba, on the morning of the 14th. She sailed on the afternoon of 15 December in convoy GZ-109 for Panama, reaching the Panama Canal and commencing her transit of the isthmian waterway on the morning of 19 December.

Drydocked that same afternoon at Balboa, Panama Canal Zone, for the complete realignment of her engine crankshaft, Basilan underwent repairs into the new year 1945.

=== Pacific theatre operations ===
After her main engine broke down during the post-repair trials on 15 January 1945, she was towed back to Balboa for additional work that lasted over almost a fortnight. Following a successful post-repair trial run, Basilan shaped a course, proceeding independently, for Pearl Harbor on 27 January.

Three-quarters of an hour into the afternoon watch on 1 February, however, she received dispatch orders re-directing her to San Francisco, California, for reconversion to an "electronic repair and staff maintenance ship." She reached the Bethlehem Steel Company's shipyard at San Francisco on 12 February. Shifting to the Naval Supply Depot to unload stores two days later, she returned to Bethlehem Steel's yard on 20 February. She remained there, undergoing conversion for her new role, through the end of March 1945.

Underway for the Western Caroline Islands on 1 April, Basilan arrived at Ulithi Atoll on the 24th, reporting for duty with Service Squadron (ServRon) 10 and assignment to work in conjunction with Jason (ARH-1). The skilled artificers of Basilan's ship repair unit (SRU) worked alongside those of Jason and under the direction of the latter's repair officer. Simultaneously, the workload of "installing, maintaining and repairing electronic equipment" kept Basilan's electronic repair force busy.

The advent of the typhoon season made it imperative to shift ServRon 10's principal base of operations from the Western Carolines to the Philippine Islands. With the selection of San Pedro Bay, Leyte Gulf, as the base site, the movement toward Leyte began on 7 May. Basilan sailed with the fourth increment of ServRon 10 on 20 May, and reached her destination on 25 May. ServRon 10's maintenance staff (later designated as Service Division 101, Maintenance) reported on board on 28 May.

Basilan carried out her support mission in Philippine waters as the Pacific War progressed to its victorious conclusion that summer. During her time in Leyte Gulf, again working with Jason, she also provided important services in conjunction with the modern repair ship Ajax (AR-6) and the veterans Vulcan (AR-5) and Prometheus (AR-3). Basilan's "skilled workmen in (the ship's) SRU and electronic repair forces," her chronicler noted modestly, performed "commendable work on such ships as the Missouri (BB-63), Bennington (CV-20), Randolph (CV-15), Essex (CV-9), and others…

"Her unique equipment also enabled her to fulfill another key sustaining role in supporting the forces afloat. "Due to our large evaporator capacity," her historian later wrote, "we were able to issue water to many of the LCIs (infantry landing craft), LCS's (support landing craft) and other small craft."

=== End-of-war operations ===
On 13 September, Basilan stood out of Leyte Gulf, bound for Jinsen (later Inchon), Korea, to participate in the occupation of that former Japanese territory, briefly retracing her course in response to warnings of two typhoons crossing her proposed course.

Earmarked for disposal on 21 September, the ship nevertheless remained on occupation duty, first at Jinsen and later at Shanghai, China, into the late autumn of 1945. Basilan concluded her occupation work on 2 December, when she sailed from Shanghai, bound for Pearl Harbor, arriving at her destination on Christmas Day 1945. She sailed for the Pacific Northwest two days later.

Reaching Seattle, Washington, on 6 January 1946, Basilan began pre-inactivation overhaul soon thereafter. Before stripping could be completed, however, on 22 February the ship received orders to report to Commandant, 14th Naval District, for berthing and eventual assignment to Joint Task Force (JTF) 1 being constituted to take part in the atomic bomb tests at Bikini Atoll (Operation Crossroads). On 25 February, the ship departed for Pearl Harbor, and reached her destination on 8 March.

== Post-war decommissioning ==
Decommissioned at Pearl on 22 April 1946, Basilan, never ultimately employed in Crossroads, remained in Hawaiian waters until 30 March 1947, when she sailed, in tow of tug VO-69, and in company with the fleet tug Abnaki (ATF-96) and five other small tugs and their tows, for San Francisco, California.

Reaching Drake's Bay on 15 April, she was turned over, having been stripped, to the U.S. Maritime Commission on 14 May. Her name was stricken from the Naval Register on 28 May 1947, and the ship remained in the National Defense Reserve Fleet at Suisun Bay, California, until 12 June 1972 when she was sold to Zidell Explorations, Inc., for scrapping.
