= USS Ajax (AR-6) =

Repair ship in the US Navy

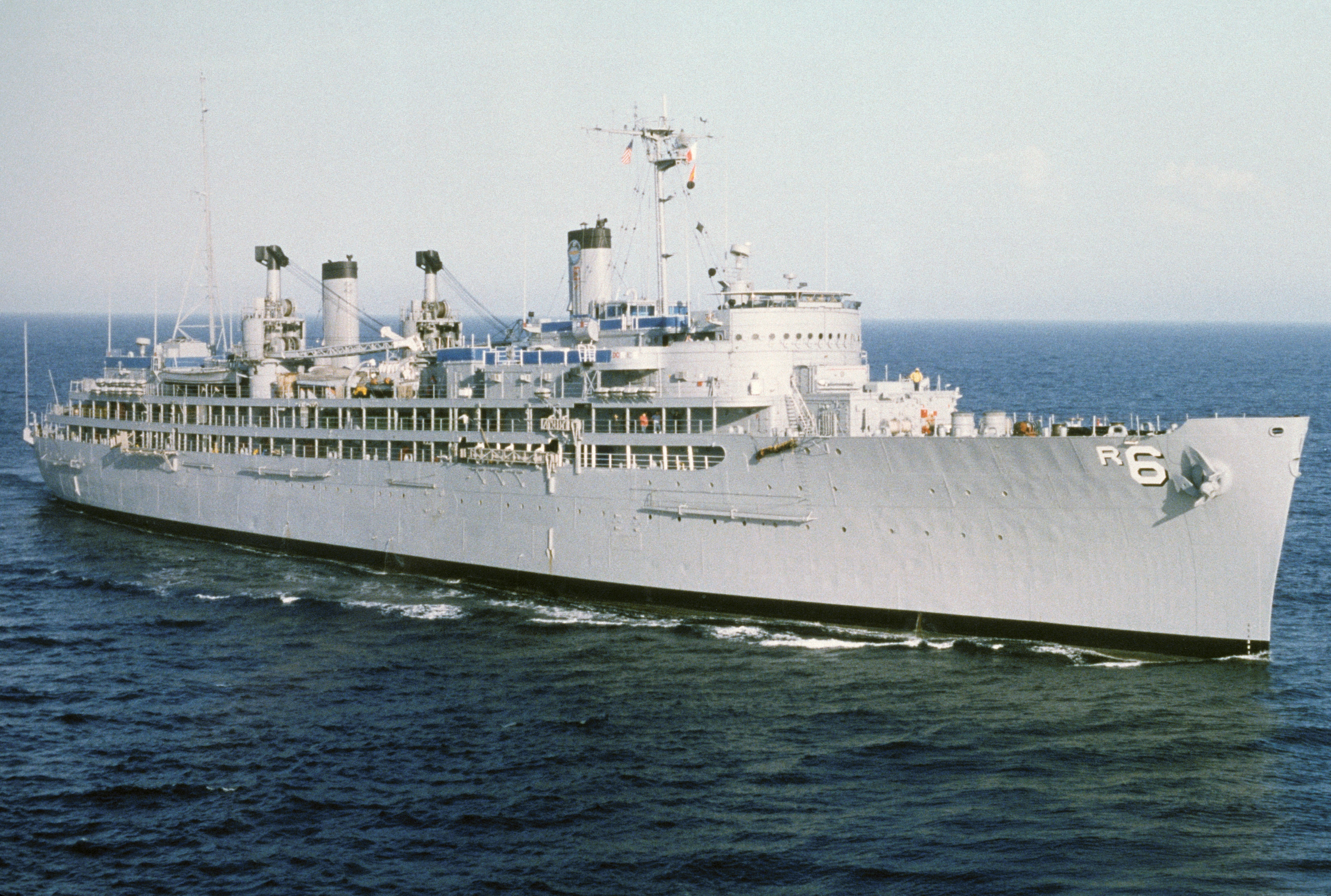
- USS Ajax (AR-6), c.1984

History

United States
- Name: USS Ajax
- Namesake: Ajax
- Builder: Los Angeles Shipbuilding and Dry Dock Company, San Pedro, California
- Laid down: 7 May 1941
- Launched: 22 August 1942
- Commissioned: 30 October 1943
- Decommissioned: 31 December 1986
- Stricken: 16 May 1989
- Honours and awards: 4 battle stars (Korea); 5 campaign stars (Vietnam)
- Fate: Sold for scrapping, 23 May 1997

General characteristics
- Class & type: Vulcan-class repair ship
- Displacement: 16,200 long tons (16,460 t) full load
- Length: 529 ft 5 in (161.37 m)
- Beam: 73 ft 4 in (22.35 m)
- Draft: 23 ft 4 in (7.11 m)
- Propulsion: 4 boilers, 2 steam turbines, 2 propeller shafts, 11,000 shp (8.2 MW)
- Speed: 19.2 knots (35.6 km/h; 22.1 mph)
- Complement: 1,000 officers and enlisted
- Armament: 4 × 5 in (127 mm) guns; 14 × 20 mm guns

USS Ajax (AR-6), in service 1943 to 1986, was the second Vulcan-class repair ship and the fourth ship in the United States Navy to bear the name. Laid down in 1941, launched in 1942 and commissioned in 1943, she was decommissioned in 1986 and finally sold for scrap. Ajax received four battle stars for Korean War service and five campaign stars for service in Vietnam.

== 1941–1945 ==
Ajax was laid down on 7 May 1941 at Los Angeles Shipbuilding and Dry Dock Company, San Pedro, California, launched on 22 August 1942. She was sponsored by Mrs. Isaac C. Johnson and commissioned on 30 October 1943.

The repair ship departed San Pedro on 9 December 1943, arrived at Pearl Harbor on 16 December, and began preparing small craft to be used as control vessels in the Marshall Islands campaign by installing radar, sound detection equipment, and antiaircraft guns. On 8 January 1944, an oil fire in her blacksmith shop threatened the entire ship, but was extinguished. Nevertheless, Ajax spent part of January repairing her own damage.

On 25 January, Ajax was ordered to proceed in company with USS Wadleigh (DD-689) to the Ellice Islands; but, two days after reaching Funafuti, she moved to Makin Atoll, Gilbert Islands, to work on the ships that would occupy Majuro in the Marshall Islands. Upon completing that mission, the ship returned to Funafuti on 26 February, only to sail three days later for Majuro.

While she was serving there, Service Squadron (ServRon) 4 was absorbed by ServRon 10. There, she and Vestal (AR-4) repaired combatant ships through the Hollandia strikes and during preparations for the Marianas campaign. On 13 June, she sailed for Eniwetok to help set up an advance repair base where she labored through August, at one time working extensive jobs on 19 cruisers and nine battleships.

Late in August, bacillary dysentery broke out among the crew and soon reached epidemic proportions. The ship was quarantined on 1 September and detached on 9 September to proceed to Kwajalein to combat the epidemic. Quarantine ended on 10 October, and Ajax steamed to Ulithi to resume repair work and to handle her first major battle damage job. Severely damaged during a torpedo attack off Formosa, Canberra (CA-70) received sufficient temporary repairs alongside Ajax to enable the cruiser to continue on to Manus. The repair ship continued her work at Ulithi in support of operations in the Philippines, Iwo Jima, and Okinawa.

On 25 May 1945, Ajax headed for Leyte-Samar Naval Base in San Pedro Bay, Leyte Gulf, to help prepare for the final assault on Japan, spending July repairing typhoon-battered USS Bennington (CV-20). The job consisted of rebuilding the forward section of her flight deck and required assistance from USS Basilan (AG-68), Baham (AK-122), and USS Jason (ARH-1).

Upon learning of Japan's capitulation on 15 August, Ajax began readying amphibious and transport ships to carry occupation forces to the Japanese home islands. On 20 September, she sailed for Guiuan, Samar, where she embarked troops for passage to Okinawa; once there, she repaired other typhoon-damaged ships. Ironically, while she was carrying out this task, typhoons forced her to go to sea herself on 28 September and on 7 October. But for these two incidents, her work at Okinawa was uninterrupted until 28 November, when she sailed for the United States with 800 passengers. She arrived at San Diego on 18 December and, three days later, entered the San Francisco Naval Shipyard for a six-week overhaul.

== 1946–1953 ==
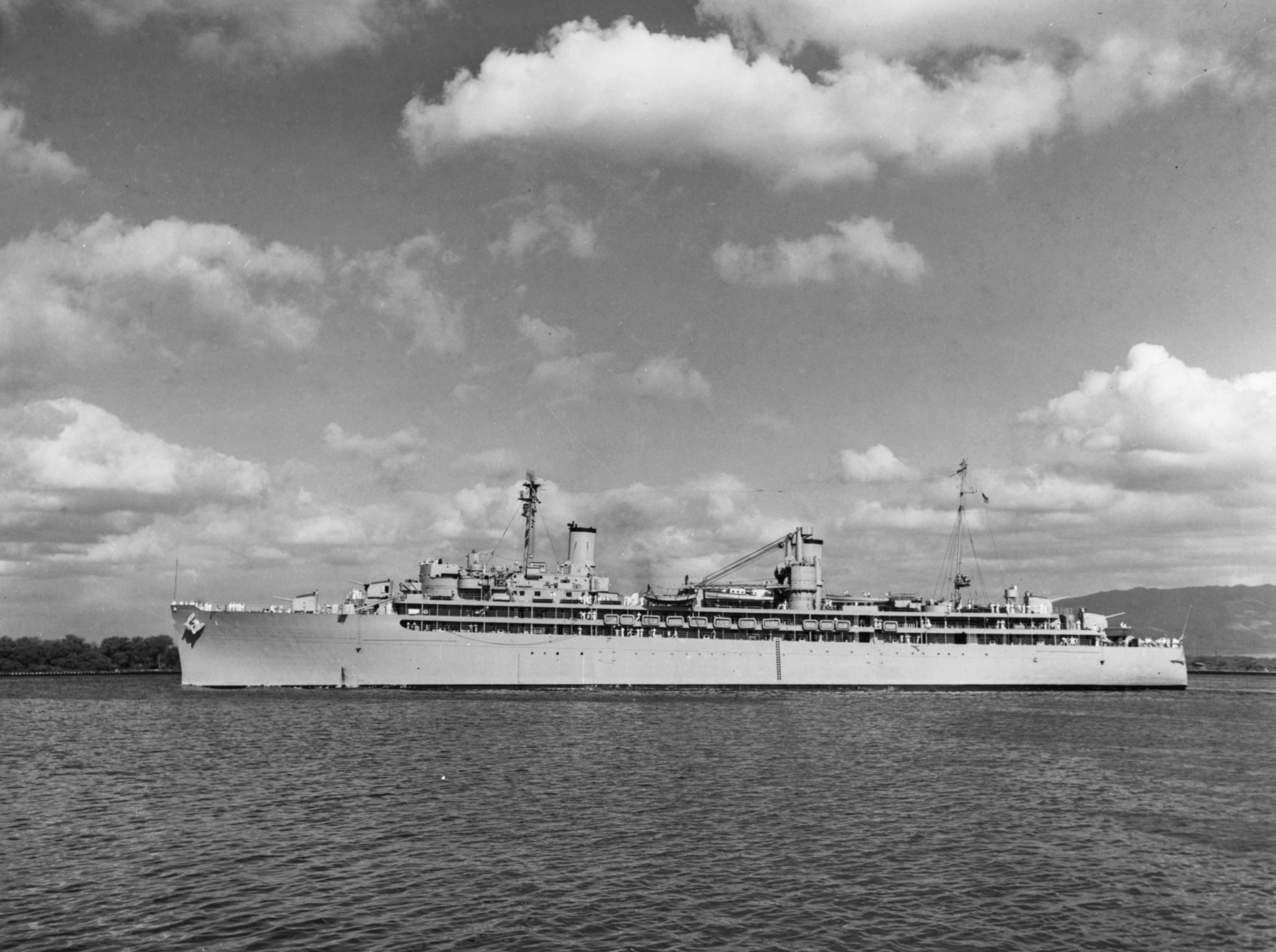
Ajax at Pearl Harbor, June 1953.

The yard work ended on 23 February 1946, and Ajax sailed via Pearl Harbor for the Bikini Atoll to participate in the atomic bomb tests to be held there in July by conducting salvaging, towing, and emergency repairs. The first bomb was dropped 16 nautical miles away from the ship, the second detonated 15.5 nautical miles away. Following the tests, she returned to San Diego on 8 October. For the next few years, she tended ships primarily at San Diego.

The repair ship got underway on 2 April 1951 for the first of many postwar cruises to Japan and arrived at Yokosuka on the 18th. She headed for Sasebo on 1 May and spent the rest of the year and early 1952 engaged in repair services in those two ports.

Ajax returned to San Diego on 26 April and devoted the next four and one-half months to operations in various shipyards and ports along the coast of California. She made five more cruises to Japan before 1960, each time operating out of Sasebo and Yokosuka and in every instance returning to San Diego.

While in Sasebo on 30 November 1952 the ship that Ajax was moored next to, the USS Ashtabula (AO -51), exploded. The resulting casualties for Ajax were two dead and three wounded.

On her 1953-1954 cruise to the Far East, Ajax, in addition to her operations out of Sasebo and Yokosuka, participated in the two-month operation "Passage to Freedom", providing support for a group of U.S. Navy ships sent to carry refugees from the Hanoi/Haiphong area of Communist North Vietnam, down to Saigon. During this operation Ajax was stationed at Touraine Indochina, a French port that later became DaNang, South Vietnam.

She returned to San Diego on 21 November 1954, along with several attack transports.

== 1960–1964 ==
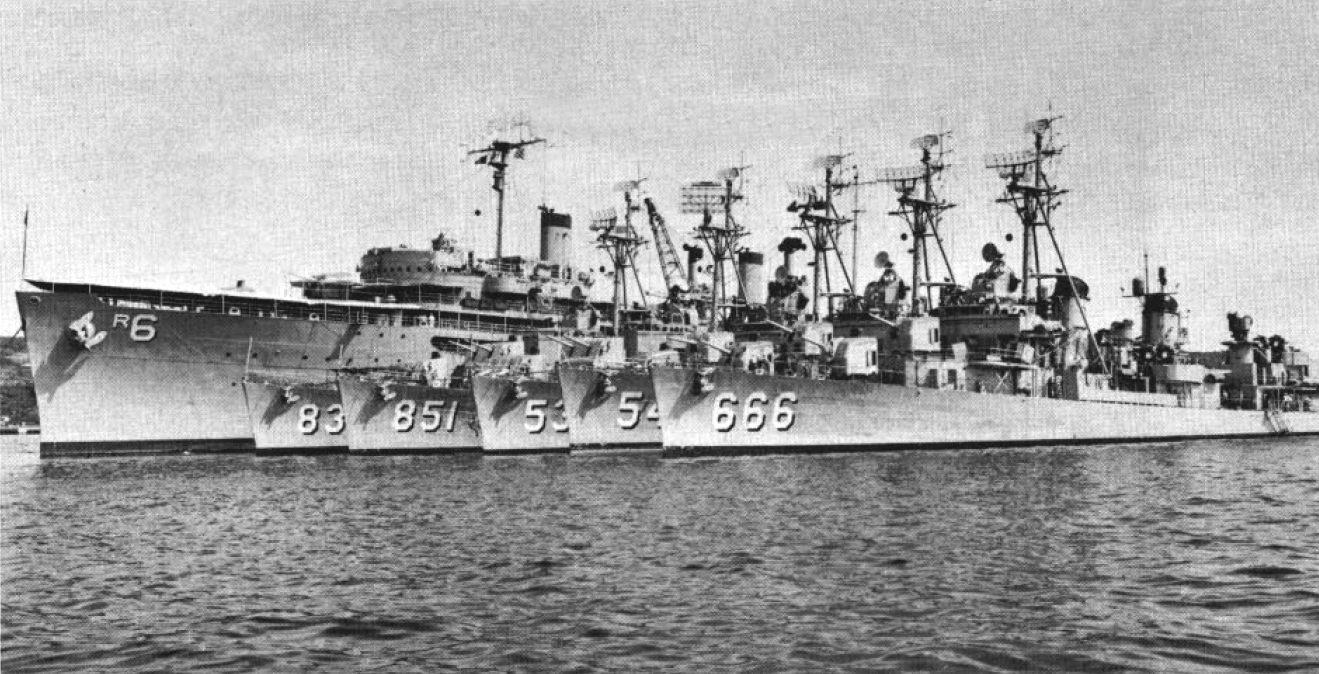
Ajax with destroyers at Sasebo, c.1962.

Ajax returned from the United States to Japan in February 1960 and in June received orders changing her home port from San Diego to Sasebo. She then became the permanent flagship of ServRon 3 in the Far East. She moved to Yokosuka in August to begin her first yard overhaul in the Orient. Among her alterations was the installation of flag office spaces for ServRon 3 staff. Following refresher training, underway replenishment, and towing exercises with Castor (AKS-1), Ajax returned to Sasebo on 17 December.

Early in 1961, she became an ambassador of goodwill on a cruise in which she entertained local dignitaries as well as the local populace during visits to Kure, Beppu, Kagoshima, Iwakuni, and Kobe, Japan; Hong Kong; Keelung and Kaoshiung, Taiwan; Subic Bay; and Buckner Bay, Okinawa. A scheduled two-day visit to the last port became a three-week stay in March and April when Ajax remained there as backup repair ship in the event that President John F. Kennedy's strong diplomatic resistance to communist aggression in Laos would involve the American Navy in hostilities.

When Seadragon (SSN-584), the first nuclear submarine to put into a Japanese port, arrived at Sasebo on 12 November 1964, Ajax served as a press platform for radio and television reporters who came to report the event.

== 1968–1976 ==
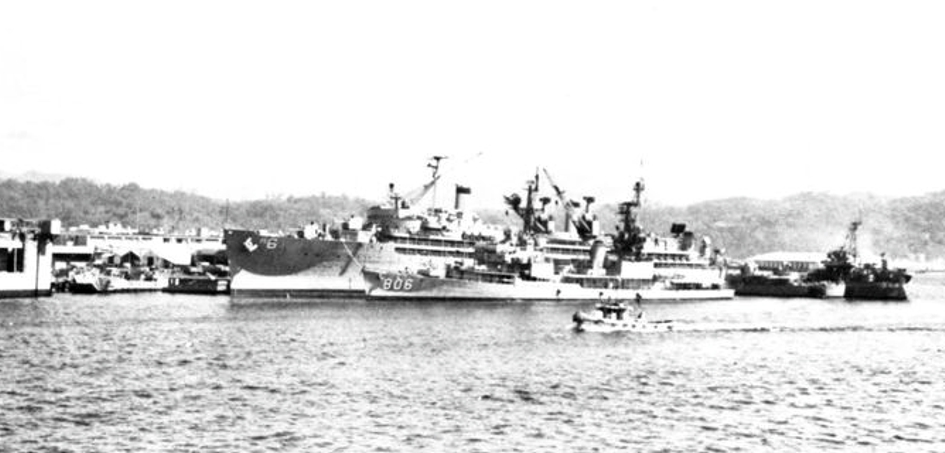
USS Ajax (AR-6) and USS Higbee (DD-806) at Naval Station Subic Bay, Philippines, c.1968.

On 10 January 1968, Ajax sailed for Subic Bay, where she remained until mid-March, before returning to her home port. On 3 June, the repair ship headed for South Vietnam and arrived at Vung Tau on 9 June. Although that port was a rest and recreation center for the allied forces, Ajax worked without break for 13 days making badly needed repairs and providing services to ships and small craft operating in the Mekong Delta, as well as to various Army and Air Force equipment ashore. The ship got underway for Subic Bay on 22 June, arrived on 25 June, and undertook a repair job of considerable significance—the regunning of 4 × 5-inch (127 mm) mounts on USS Boston. The repair ship's technicians worked around the clock for seven days to complete the job and return Boston to her ready status. After her arrival in Sasebo on 23 July, Ajax provided routine repairs and service support for ships there and in Yokosuka for the remainder of the year and the beginning of 1969.

Ajax continued her usual routine of servicing ships in Sasebo, Yokosuka, and Subic Bay during 1969, including a two-week stay in Vung Tau from 27 September to 10 October. As 1970 began, she received word that her home port would revert to San Diego effective 1 June. Prior to that date, Ajax continued servicing Vung Tau from 18 April to 11 May in support of the Cambodian Campaign. USS Hector relieved Ajax as flagship on 10 July; and, on the 15th, the latter headed for San Diego where she arrived on 6 August.

On 14 June 1971, following a year's service on the California coast, the ship once again steamed toward Japan and arrived in Sasebo on 5 July. Commander, Service Group (ComServGru) 3, embarked; and Ajax commenced business as usual. The ship spent September in Vung Tau, but her month of hard work there was followed by five days of rest and relaxation in Hong Kong before she returned to Sasebo on 1 October. However, the vessel soon again proceeded to Vung Tau and worked diligently for the first three weeks in November. Next came a three-day rest in Keelung and Taipei, Taiwan, before a run back to Sasebo to prepare for the voyage home. On 27 January 1972, ComServGru 3 shifted his flag to Hector; and Ajax steamed via Pearl Harbor to San Diego, where she arrived on 16 February and served for the remainder of the year.

Ajax again got underway westward on 16 January 1973 and stopped at Pearl Harbor before arriving in Sasebo on 6 February to relieve USS Jason as flagship. The ship made two rest and relaxation cruises, one in April to Keelung and the other in July to Hong Kong. Typhoon Dot complicated the second cruise by closing Hong Kong harbor and causing Ajax to circle in rough waters for two extra days before pulling into port. Her return to Sasebo on 25 July was uneventful; and, after being relieved by Hector on 7 August, the ship headed home, arrived at San Diego on 29 August, and remained in California for the rest of the year and the first six months of 1974. On 6 July of that year, she got underway in company with USS Tolovana and steamed for Yokosuka which she reached on 27 July. She operated there until 8 November when she headed for Subic Bay to provide fleet repair services. She labored in the Philippines for a month before proceeding to Kaohsiung, Taiwan, where she ended the year.

Ajax returned to San Diego on 15 February 1975. On 5 October, she got underway for a two-month visit to Pearl Harbor to provide repair support in the middle Pacific. She departed Hawaii on 8 December and arrived in her home port on the 15th in time for a holiday in a leave and upkeep period. Ajax remained in or near San Diego for the entire year 1976.

== 1977–1986 ==
During the first half of 1977, Ajax made ready for another deployment. The ship departed San Diego with USS Blue Ridge on 24 August and arrived at Pearl Harbor on 31 August. The following morning, Ajax got underway for Japan and six months in Yokosuka. A series of labor strikes by Japanese employees gave the repair ship's crew members the opportunity to prove their expertise and capabilities. Besides carrying out their normal duties, they helped run the base utilities and acted as firemen, bus drivers, and skilled practitioners of many other occupations to aid the naval activity. She visited Taipei, Taiwan, in December and spent four days in January 1978 in Pusan, Korea. On 5 February, she headed via Pearl Harbor for San Diego, where she arrived on 24 February.

Except for two days of sea trials in April, Ajax remained at San Diego until mid-1980. During this period she received an overhaul there by the National Steel and Shipbuilding Company which lasted from 21 September 1978 to 21 July 1979.

On 20 May, she sailed for the Orient and reached Subic Bay on 17 June. Three days later, the ship got underway and steamed via Sri Lanka to Diego Garcia, where she arrived and relieved USS L. Y. Spear on 6 July. During her busy three months in the Indian Ocean servicing 31 ships, Ajax made a brief visit to Port Louis, Mauritius, for recreation. On 12 October, after being relieved by USS Emory S. Land, Ajax sailed eastward; stopped in Bunbury and Sydney, Australia; Pearl Harbor; and finally reached San Diego on 20 November.

With the exception of two three-day visits to San Francisco and two days of training in the local operating area, Ajax remained in San Diego throughout 1981. One notable occurrence during the year was the reporting on board for duty of the ship's first 30 enlisted women. While the women became accustomed to shipboard routine, Ajax underwent inspections and training. On 16 October, the ship reached another milestone in the Women at Sea program when Ens. Dale Norris became the first woman officer on board Ajax to become surface warfare qualified.

On 22 January 1982, Ajax got underway for training and a brief port visit to Mazatlan, Mexico, and arrived back home on the last day of the month. Pre-overseas movement preparations throughout the next few months ensured that the repair ship was ready for her 2 April departure for the western Pacific and the Indian Ocean. After a four-day stopover in Pearl Harbor, the ship headed for Subic Bay, where she arrived on 1 May and spent three weeks providing fleet repair services before continuing on to Diego Garcia, where she arrived on 1 June. During that deployment, Ajax visited Berbera in Somalia, Singapore, and Pattaya in Thailand, before she returned—via Pearl Harbor—to San Diego. The repair ship entered San Diego on 21 October and commenced post-deployment stand-down.

Her leave and upkeep period came to an end in November, and Ajax set about her repair work once again. Over the next seven months, the ship provided repair services for units of the Pacific Fleet at San Diego, served as a training facility for naval reserve detachments undergoing their annual two weeks of active duty, and made preparations for a regular overhaul. She also put to sea infrequently for trials and, on one occasion in May and June 1983, to carry her repair services to Bremerton, Wash. Ajax returned to San Diego from that mission on 10 June 1983 and, the next day, began a month of final preparations for overhaul. On 11 July, her crew moved to living spaces on board a non-self-propelled barracks ship, and the overhaul began in earnest.

Receiving repair services, rather than extending them to others, occupied her time for the rest of 1983 and during the first two months of 1984. On 1 and 2 March, she put to sea to conduct post-overhaul trials and, on the 3rd, resumed repair services to other units of the Pacific Fleet. During the last week in March, she was frequently at sea in the local operating area carrying out independent ship's exercises. From the beginning of April to late June, Ajax performed repair missions at San Diego. On 27 June, the repair ship stood out of San Diego and, after a day of independent ship's exercises in the local operating area, shaped a course for the Naval Air Station, Alameda, where she moored on 29 June. Ajax carried out repair assignments at Alameda until the third week in September. On 16 September, she got underway to conduct exercises and then head back to San Diego. The repair ship tied up at pierside at the Naval Station, San Diego, on 19 September. Except for two periods at sea in October for refresher training, Ajax spent the rest of 1984 in port repairing ships of the Pacific Fleet.

She continued so engaged into January 1985, though she interrupted those efforts from the 19th to the 21st to carry out sea trials in the southern California operating area. The first three weeks of February brought more repair work; however, on the 22nd, she put to sea again bound for Long Beach. Ajax reached her destination on 27 February and set about her work almost immediately. She spent the next five months—save for five days underway locally in May—performing repairs at Long Beach. On 31 July, the repair ship embarked upon the final overseas assignment of her Navy career.

Her last deployment afforded Ajax a real opportunity to carry out the function for which she had been designed and built. Continually moving, she performed repairs at widely separated locations. Steaming by way of Hawaii and Guam, she arrived in the Philippines at Subic Bay on 31 August. From Subic Bay, she voyaged to Singapore, where she stopped between 24 September and 3 October. Leaving Singapore, Ajax headed through the Malacca Strait into the Indian Ocean. She arrived at isolated Diego Garcia Island on 11 October but resumed her voyage again on the 13th. The repair ship dropped anchor at Al Masirah, an island in the Arabian Sea just off the east coast of Oman, on the 19th and carried out repair work there until the beginning of November. On the 2d, she headed back to Diego Garcia, where she arrived on the 9th. Her crew performed repairs on USS Mars (AFS-1) and USS Shasta (AE-33) before Ajax put to sea to return to Al Masirah. After conducting availabilities for ships of the Middle East Force at Al Masirah from 22 November to 5 December, she put to sea to avoid a large dust storm. While still underway, she laid in a course for Singapore on 7 December. The ship reached her destination on 20 December. Following repairs on USS Jesse L. Brown (FF-1089), Ajax set sail once again on 31 December bound for Diego Garcia Island. She arrived at Diego Garcia on 7 January 1986 and provided repair services there for a fortnight. On 22 January, the ship left Diego Garcia in her wake and set course for Pattaya, Thailand, where she spent most of the first week in February. On 12 February, Ajax stood into Subic Bay where she was relieved by Hector.

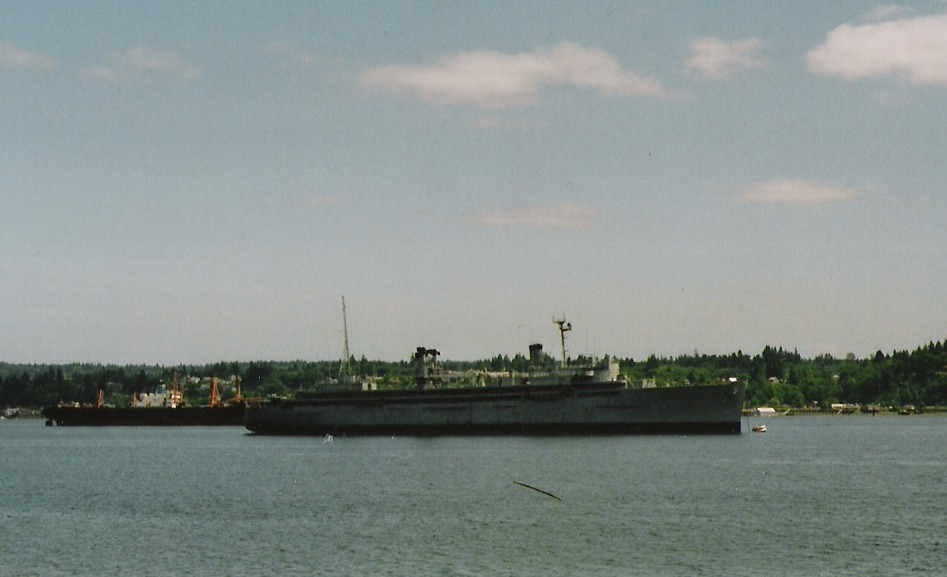
USS Ajax at Bremerton in 1989.

The repair ship embarked upon the long voyage across the Pacific Ocean on 21 February. She stopped at Pearl Harbor between 8 and 10 March and arrived back in San Diego on the 18th. Following the usual leave and upkeep period, Ajax resumed her repair services. That activity lasted until the second week in September when she began preparations to go out of service. Ajax was decommissioned at San Diego on 31 December 1986.

Struck from the Navy list on 16 May 1989, Ajax was finally sold for scrapping by the Defense Reutilization and Marketing Service on 23 May 1997. Dismantled at International Shipbreaking Limited, Brownsville, TX.

== Awards ==
- Top Row – Navy Unit Commendation – Navy Meritorious Unit Commendation – Navy Battle "E" Ribbon
- Second Row – Navy Expeditionary Medal (Iran/Indian Ocean) – American Campaign Medal – Asiatic-Pacific Campaign Medal
- Third Row – World War II Victory Medal – Navy Occupation Service Medal (with Asia clasp) – National Defense Service Medal (2)
- Fourth Row – Korean Service Medal (4) – Vietnam Service Medal (5) – Philippines Liberation Medal
- Fifth Row – United Nations Service Medal – Republic of Vietnam Campaign Medal – Republic of Korea War Service Medal (retroactive)
