= Carrier Air Wing Sixteen (CVW-16) =

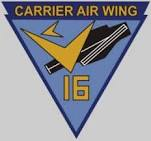
- Active: 1 September 1960 – 30 June 1971 (As CVW-16)
- Country: United States
- Branch: United States Navy
- Type: Carrier air wing
- Engagements: Vietnam War

Carrier Air Wing Sixteen was a carrier air wing of the United States Navy. It was established as Carrier Air Group Sixteen on 1 September 1960. It became Carrier Air Wing Sixteen on 20 December 1963, and was disestablished in 1971.

It is distinct from the 1943-1945 Carrier Air Group Sixteen (CVG-16); the various Wings and Groups are discussed in the list of United States Navy aircraft wings.

The wing served aboard USS Oriskany from 1962 (as a CVG) to 1968, including the heavy losses of the 1967-68 cruise.
