= Carrier Air Group Sixteen (CVG-16) =

- Active: 16 November 1943 – 6 November 1945
- Country: United States
- Branch: United States Navy
- Type: Carrier air group
- Engagements: World War II

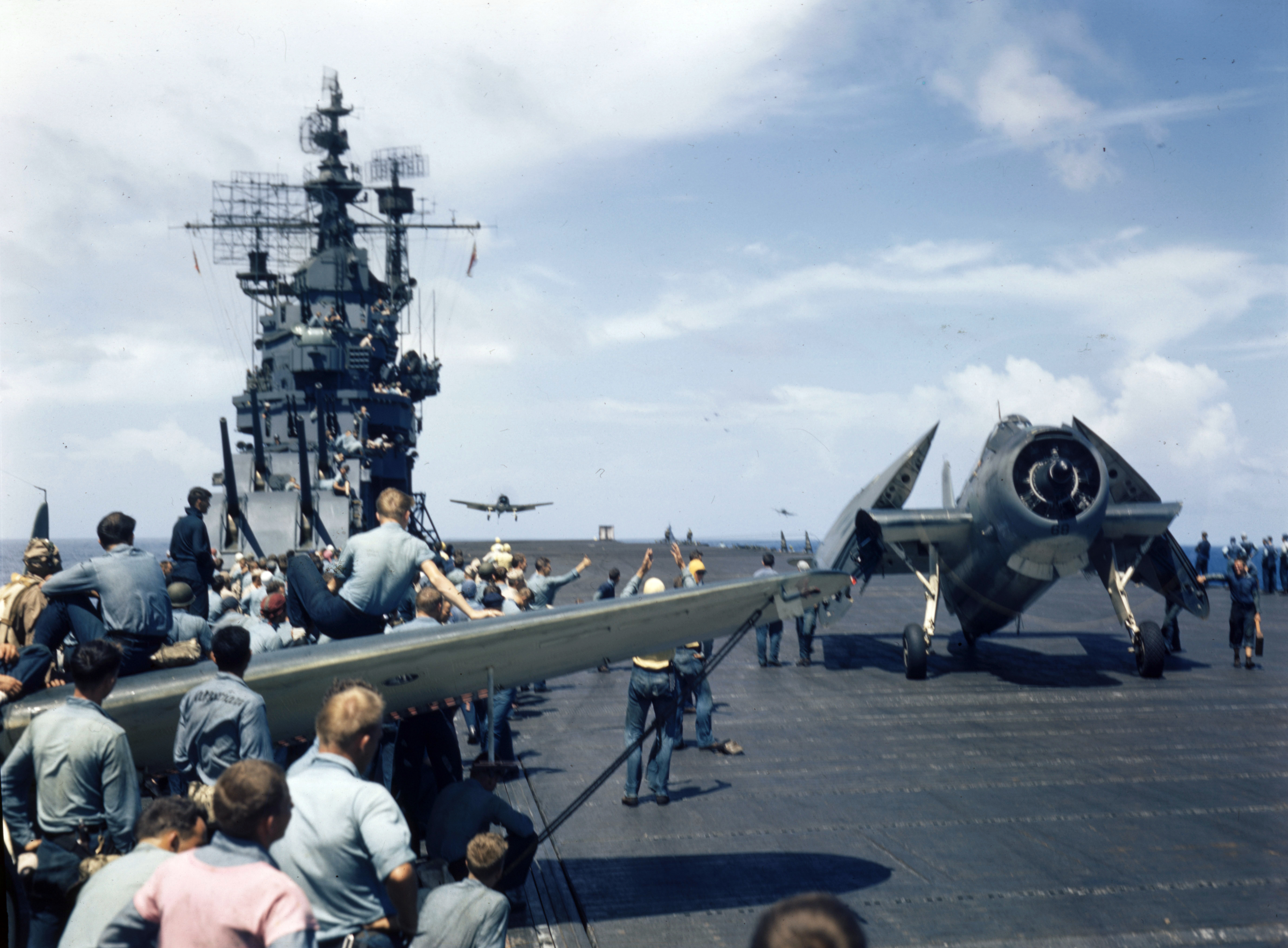
Aircraft from CVG-16 landing aboard USS Lexington (CV-16), in November 1943 (80-G-K-15290)

Carrier Air Group Sixteen was a carrier air group of the United States Navy. It was established on 16 November 1943 and was disestablished on 6 November 1945, according to the Naval History and Heritage Command. A period with an earlier start, which is consistent with the lifetime of the USS Lexington (CV-16), from 11 May 1942 to 15 October 1945 appears in an unofficial source.

It is distinct from the 1960-1971 Carrier Air Wing Sixteen; the various Wings and Groups are discussed in the list of United States Navy aircraft wings.

== History ==
The group served aboard USS Lexington (CV-16) from its creation. That ship's Presidential Unit Citation includes "AG-16" participating in various actions at Tarawa, Wake, the Gilberts, Palau, Hollandia, Truk, and the Marianas from 18 September 1943 to 5 July 1944.

It moved to USS Randolph (CV-15) no later than 10 July 1944, at which time it raided airfields around Tokyo.

=== Composition ===
CVG-16 included the following during at least 1943 and 1944, and probably over its full existence from 1942 through 1945.

- Fighting Squadron VF-16
- Bombing Squadron VB-16
- Torpedo Squadron VT-16

A Scout Squadron (VS-16) may have existed from 11 May 1942 to 8 June 1943. A night fighter squadron, VF(N)-76 Det. C, was deployed with CVG-16 from 3 March 1944 to 9 July 1944. From 10 July 1945 to 15 October 1945 on the USS Randolph (CV-15), a Bombing Fighter Squadron (VBF-16) existed as well.
