= USS Randolph (CV-15) =

Essex-class aircraft carrier of the US Navy

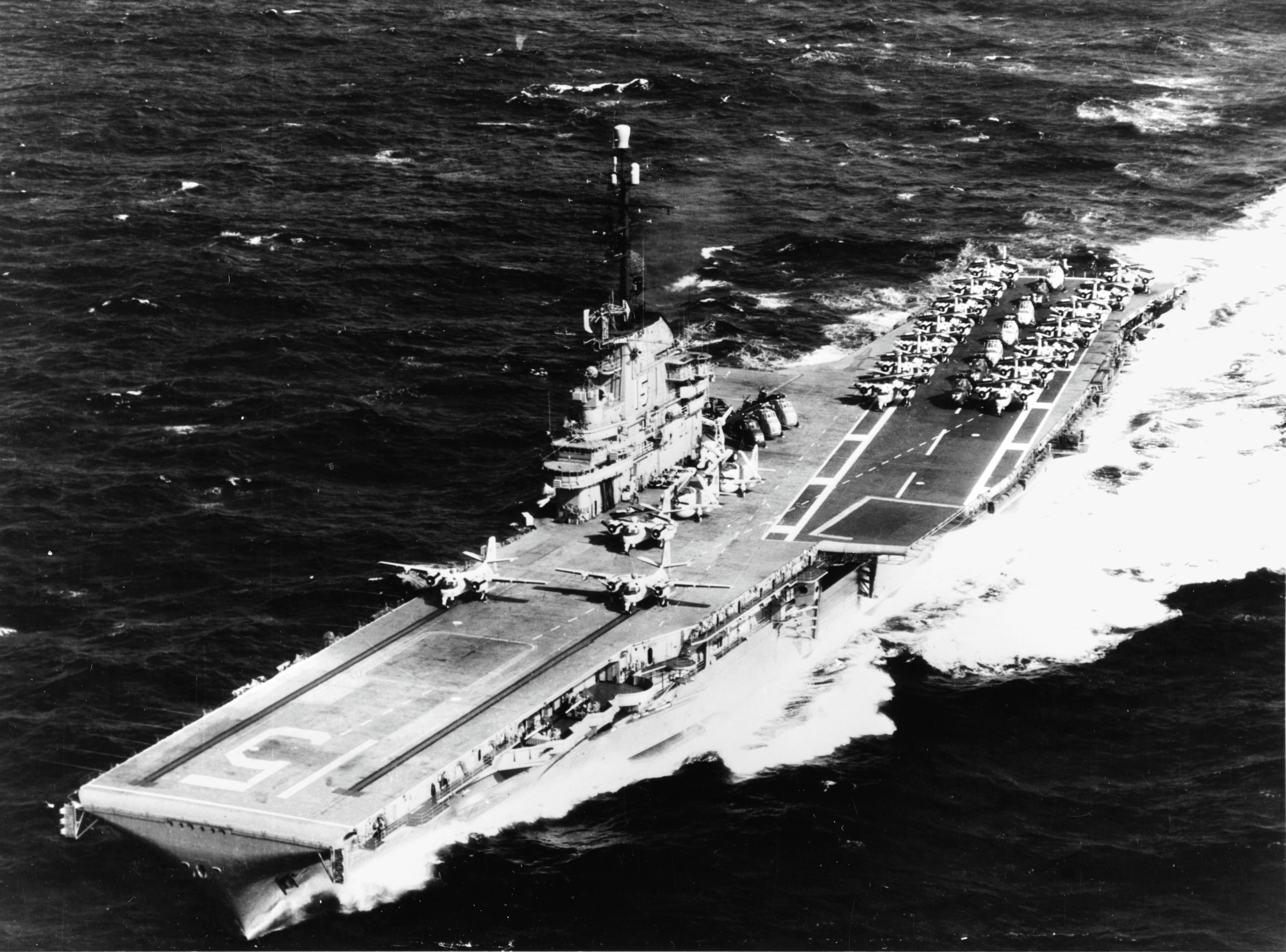
- USS Randolph underway on 25 October 1959

History

United States
- Name: Randolph
- Namesake: Peyton Randolph
- Builder: Newport News Shipbuilding and Drydock Company
- Laid down: 10 May 1943
- Launched: 28 June 1944
- Commissioned: 9 October 1944
- Decommissioned: 25 February 1948
- Recommissioned: 1 July 1953
- Decommissioned: 13 February 1969
- Reclassified: CVA-15, 1 October 1952; CVS-15, 31 March 1959
- Stricken: 1 June 1973
- Fate: Scrapped, 24 May 1975

General characteristics
- Class & type: Essex-class aircraft carrier
- Displacement: 27,100 long tons (27,500 t) standard
- Length: 888 feet (271 m) overall
- Beam: 93 feet (28 m)
- Draft: 28 feet 7 inches (8.71 m)
- Installed power: 8 × boilers; 150,000 shp (110 MW)
- Propulsion: 4 × geared steam turbines; 4 × shafts
- Speed: 33 knots (61 km/h; 38 mph)
- Complement: 3448 officers and enlisted
- Armament: 12 × 5 inch (127 mm)/38 caliber guns; 32 × Bofors 40 mm guns; 46 × Oerlikon 20 mm cannons
- Armor: Belt: 4 in (102 mm); Hangar deck: 2.5 in (64 mm); Deck: 1.5 in (38 mm); Conning tower: 1.5 inch
- Aircraft carried: 90–100 aircraft

USS Randolph (CV/CVA/CVS-15) was one of 24 Essex-class aircraft carriers built during and following World War II for the United States Navy. The second US Navy ship to bear the name, she was named for Founding Father Peyton Randolph, president of the First Continental Congress. Randolph was commissioned in October 1944, and served in several campaigns in the Pacific Theater of Operations, earning three battle stars. Decommissioned shortly after the end of the war, she was modernized and recommissioned in the early 1950s as an attack carrier (CVA), and then eventually became an antisubmarine carrier (CVS).

In her second career she operated exclusively in the Atlantic, Mediterranean, and Caribbean. In the early 1960s she served as the recovery ship for two Project Mercury space missions, including John Glenn's historic first orbital flight. She was decommissioned in 1969 and sold for scrap in 1975.

== Construction and commissioning ==
Randolph was one of the "long-hull" Essex-class ships. She was laid down on 10 May 1943 in Shipway 10, at Newport News Shipbuilding & Dry Dock Co., Newport News, Virginia. She was launched on 28 June 1944, sponsored by Rose Gillette (wife of Guy M. Gillette, a US Senator from Iowa). Randolph was commissioned on 9 October 1944.

== Service history ==
=== World War II ===
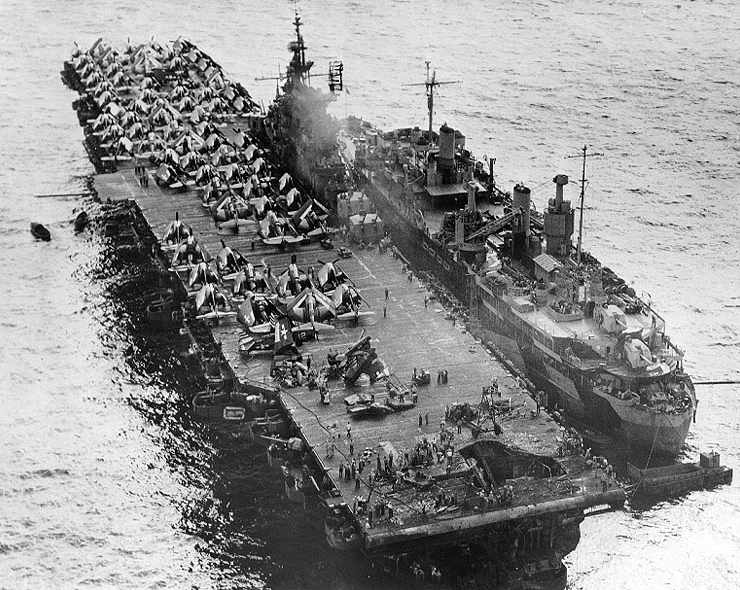
Randolph alongside the repair ship Jason at Ulithi Atoll in the Caroline Islands on 13 March 1945, showing damage to her after flight deck resulting from a kamikaze hit on 11 March. Photographed from a Miami floatplane

Following shakedown off Trinidad, Randolph got underway for the Panama Canal and the Pacific. On 31 December, she reached San Francisco where Air Group 87 was detached and Air Group 12 reported on board for four months duty.

On 20 January 1945, Randolph departed San Francisco for Ulithi, from which she sortied on 10 February with Task Force 58 (TF 58). She launched attacks on 16–17 February against Tokyo airfields and the Tachikawa engine plant. The following day, she made a strike on the island of Chichi Jima. On 20 February, she launched three aerial sweeps in support of ground forces invading Iwo Jima and two against Haha Jima. During the next four days, further strikes hit Iwo Jima and combat air patrols were flown almost continuously. Three sweeps against airfields in the Tokyo area and one against Hachijo Jima followed on 25 February before the carrier returned to Ulithi.

Riding at anchor at Ulithi on 11 March, a Yokosuka P1Y1 "Frances" kamikaze hit Randolph on the starboard side aft just below the flight deck, killing 27 men, including four reported missing and five transferred to the hospital ship Relief where they later died, and wounding 105, during Operation Tan No. 2.

The initial damage assessment by the ship's captain and later confirmed by task force commander, Admiral Raymond Spruance, was that Randolph's damage was beyond the repair capabilities at Pearl Harbor and the ship would have to return to Navy facilities on the US west coast, effectively taking Randolph out of action for some five months, including the upcoming invasion of Okinawa. At this point, Randolph's catapult officer was able to convince the captain and Spruance that repairs could be completed at sea utilizing USS Jason (AR-8), a repair ship in the immediate vicinity.

What ensued became the most extensive repair at sea ever performed by the US Navy. The captain's first act was to move number six (forward) arresting-gear catapult engine aft to replace the destroyed number one engine. This returned Randolph, very quickly, to an operational status. With Randolph able to launch and retrieve aircraft, and thus defend herself, repairs focused on the massive task, at the ship's stern, involving the replacement of structural steel components forming the hangar deck, aircraft elevator framework and flight deck support, all warped or destroyed by the fires ignited by the kamikaze hit. Some 29 tons of structural steel, including I-beams salvaged from a Japanese sugar mill on newly liberated Saipan, were utilized. An additional 7,500 board feet of lumber was required to repair Randolph’s flight deck. In the words of Cmdr. Charles Minter, assistant air officer on board Randolph, "That decision to remain in the forward area [for repairs] allowed us to complete the war in an operational status. I doubt anyone could estimate how long we would have been in the yard had we gone back to the States, and the loss of the Randolph at that particular time would have been crucial. Slingin' Sam (Lt. Cmdr. Samuel Humphreys) saved the day".

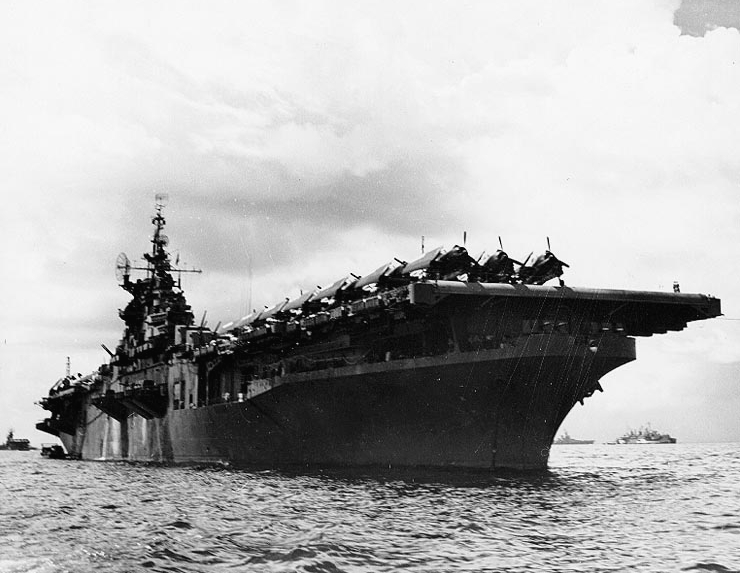
Randolph at anchor in the Western Pacific in June 1945

Working twenty four hours a day at sea off Ulithi, Randolph’s repairs, initiated after the fires from the 11 March kamikaze attack were extinguished, were completed by 1 April, the launch date of the Okinawa invasion. Randolph joined Task Force 58 on 7 April. Combat air patrols (CAP) were flown daily until 14 April, when strikes were sent against Okinawa, Ie Shima, and Kakeroma Island. The following day, an air support mission of fighters, bombers, and torpedo planes hit Okinawa and a fighter sweep struck an airfield in southern Kyūshū. Under daily air attack from 17 April on, Randolph continued to send her aircraft on CAP and support missions throughout the month.

In May, planes from the carriers hit the Ryukyu Islands and southern Japan, Kikai (Amami Islands) naval base and airfields, and Kyūshū airfields. Becoming the flagship of TF 58 on 15 May, Randolph continued her support of the occupation of Okinawa until 29 May, when she retired via Guam to the Philippines. On 7 June, while loading supplies in the Philippines, a P-38 Lightning practicing strafing runs lost control and crashed against the deck of the Randolph, killing thirteen sailors and destroying ten of Randolph's aircraft. USS Jason repaired Randolph in four days, due to the damage being far less severe than the Kamikaze attack.

On her next war cruise, as a part of Admiral Halsey's 3rd Fleet, Randolph made a series of strikes up and down the Japanese home islands. With Carrier Air Group Sixteen (CVG-16) (distinct from the later Air Group 16) replacing Air Group 12, the ship launched eight raids on 10 July against airfields in the Tokyo area, principally those on the peninsula east of Tokyo Bay. On the 14th, her planes struck the airfields and shipping in and near Tsugaru Strait. In this attack, two of the important Honshū-Hokkaidō train ferries were sunk and three were damaged. Attacks on the Japanese home islands continued for the next few days, and on 18 July, the Japanese battleship Nagato – lying camouflaged alongside a pier at the Yokosuka Naval Base – was bombed.

Moving southwest, Randolph and other carriers were off the coast of Shikoku on 24 July, for an anti-shipping sweep of the Inland Sea, during which the carrier-battleship Hyūga was heavily damaged and airfields and industrial installations on Kyūshū, Honshū, and Shikoku were hit hard. Randolph's pilots estimated that from 10 to 25 July they had destroyed 25 to 30 ships, ranging in size from small luggers to a 6000-ton freighter, and had damaged 35 to 40 others. Randolph's strikes continued right up to the morning of the 15 August surrender, when her planes hit Kisarazu Airfield and surrounding installations.

=== Post-war ===
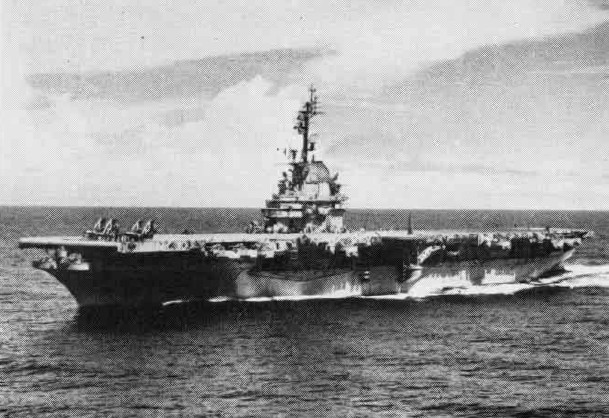
Randolph after her SCB-27A modernization

Following the end of the war, Randolph headed home. Transiting the Panama Canal in late September, she arrived at Naval Station Norfolk on 15 October, where she was rigged for "Magic Carpet" service. Before the end of the year, she completed two trips to the Mediterranean area to return American servicemen. Then, in 1946, she became a training ship for reservists and midshipmen, and made a Mediterranean cruise in the latter half of the year. After another voyage to the Caribbean, she embarked midshipmen in the early summer of 1947 for a cruise to northern European waters. Randolph was placed out of commission, in reserve, 25 February 1948, and berthed at Philadelphia Naval Shipyard.

In June 1951, Randolph commenced her SCB-27A modernization program at Norfolk Naval Shipyard. To handle the new generation of carrier aircraft, the flight deck structure was reinforced. Stronger elevators, more powerful hydraulic catapults, and new arresting gear were installed. The island structure was rebuilt, the anti-aircraft turrets were removed, and blisters were added to the hull. Reclassified CVA-15 on 1 October 1952, Randolph recommissioned on 1 July 1953. After a shakedown cruise off Guantánamo Bay with Carrier Air Group 10, she took on Carrier Air Group 14, departed Norfolk for the Mediterranean, and joined the 6th Fleet on 3 February 1954, deployed for 6 months of Fleet and NATO exercises until 6 August 1954. Randolph entered the Norfolk Naval Shipyard on 18 June 1955 for the installation of an angled flight deck and other SCB-125 modernizations.

Leaving the yard in January 1956, Randolph conducted air operations off the East Coast for the next six months, and was the first Atlantic Fleet carrier to launch a Regulus guided missile from her flight deck. On 14 July 1956, Randolph again steamed east for a seven-month tour of duty with the 6th Fleet in the Mediterranean. When Israel, Britain, and France invaded the United Arab Republic in October of that year, Randolph stood ready. Operating near the Suez Canal, her aircraft provided air cover and surface and air reconnaissance for the evacuation of U.S. nationals from Alexandria. She returned to the United States on 19 February 1957. After a few months operating off the East Coast, Randolph deployed to the Mediterranean again on 1 July 1957. Between August and December, as political turmoil in Syria threatened to further disturb the already turbulent Mideast, she patrolled the eastern Mediterranean. Back in the United States on 24 February 1958, the carrier made her fifth Mediterranean deployment from 2 September 1958 to 12 March 1959.

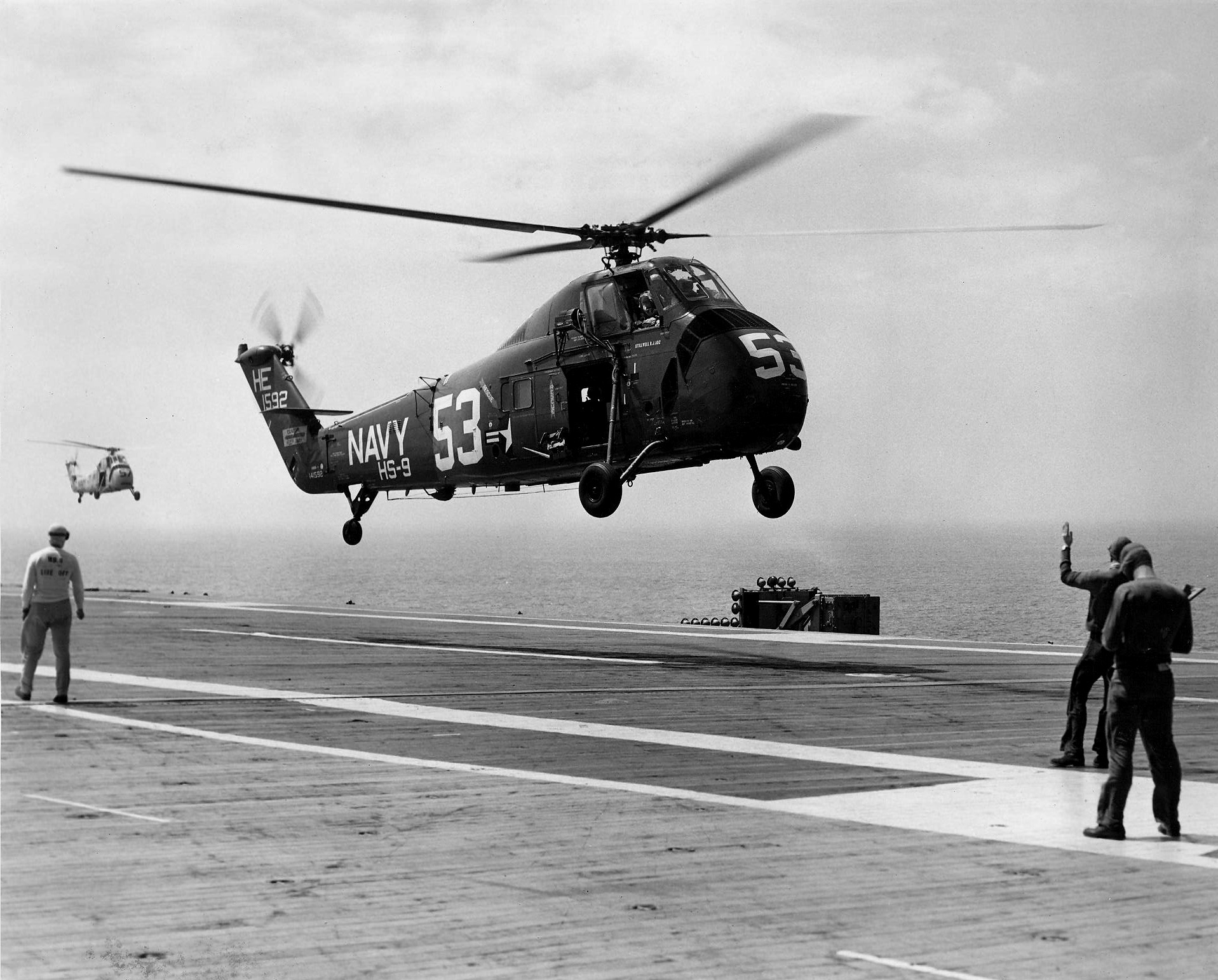
HSS-1 Seabat of HS-9 lands on Randolph in July 1959

Randolph was reclassified CVS-15 on 31 March 1959, and conducted anti-submarine warfare (ASW) operations off the East Coast throughout that year and the next, receiving her fourth consecutive Battle Efficiency Award in September 1960. From October 1960 to March 1961, Randolph underwent the SCB-144 upgrade as part of the Fleet Rehabilitation and Modernization program. She received the new SQS-23 bow sonar, as well as improved displays in the Combat Information Center.

In the summer of 1962, Randolph again steamed to the Mediterranean. Returning to the western Atlantic as the Cuban Missile Crisis broke, she operated in the Caribbean from the end of October through November. On 27 October, Randolph and a group of eleven US Navy destroyers entrapped a nuclear-armed Soviet Foxtrot-class submarine B-59 near Cuba and started dropping practice depth charges, explosives intended to force the submarine to come to the surface for identification. Reportedly, the captain of the submarine, Valentin Grigorievitch Savitsky, believing that a war might already have started, prepared to launch a retaliatory nuclear-tipped torpedo, but Second Captain Vasily Arkhipov persuaded the captain to surface to await orders from Moscow. After an overhaul at Norfolk, Randolph resumed her station in the Atlantic. Over the next five years, she made two Mediterranean cruises and a northern European cruise, while spending most of her time off the East Coast and in the Caribbean.

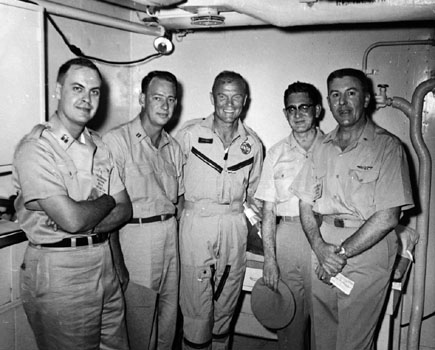
Medical debriefing aboard Randolph of Mercury astronaut John Glenn (center), after the orbital flight of Friendship 7 on 20 February 1962

In July 1961, Randolph sailed for operations in the Caribbean and served as the recovery ship after splashdown for astronaut Virgil "Gus" Grissom on America's second crewed space flight, a suborbital shot. In February 1962, Randolph was the primary recovery ship for astronaut John Glenn on his flight, the first American orbital voyage in space. After his historic three-orbit flight, he landed safely near the destroyer Noa from which he was transferred, by helicopter, to Randolph. On 1 April 1964, in an unusual accident, the Number Three deck elevator of Randolph tore loose from the ship during a vicious storm at night and fell into the Atlantic off Cape Henry, Virginia, taking with it a Grumman S-2D Tracker, five crewmen, and a tractor. Three crew were rescued by the destroyer Holder, but two were lost at sea.

=== Decommissioning ===
On 7 August 1968, the Defense Department announced that it would inactivate Randolph and 49 other ships to reduce fiscal expenditures in 1969. Randolph was decommissioned on 13 February 1969 at Boston Navy Yard and laid up in the reserve fleet at Philadelphia Naval Shipyard. Randolph was stricken from the Navy List on 1 June 1973. In May 1975, the Defense Reutilization and Marketing Service sold the ship to Union Minerals & Alloys for $1,560,000. Randolph was towed to Kearny, New Jersey, and broken up for scrap. One of her anchors is located on the river front in Toms River, New Jersey. Another anchor was placed at a Naval Reserve unit in Kingsport, Tennessee. That building was later designated for decommissioning and destruction. With the blessing and approval of the Randolph Association, that anchor was kept in Kingsport and then relocated in 1990 to Sullivan North High School for representation of their newly commissioned NJROTC program. After the closing of that school, the anchor was moved on 7 June 2023 to its new home in Lebanon Missouri where it's being refurbished and being placed on display in the city's Veterans Park with a dedication on Veterans Day, 11 November 2023. Her binnacle is preserved at the Portsmouth Naval Shipyard Museum.

== Awards ==

American Campaign Medal	Asiatic–Pacific Campaign Medal (with three battle stars)	World War II Victory Medal
Navy Occupation Service Medal (with Asia and Europe clasps)	National Defense Service Medal (twice)	Armed Forces Expeditionary Medal (twice)

== Gallery ==
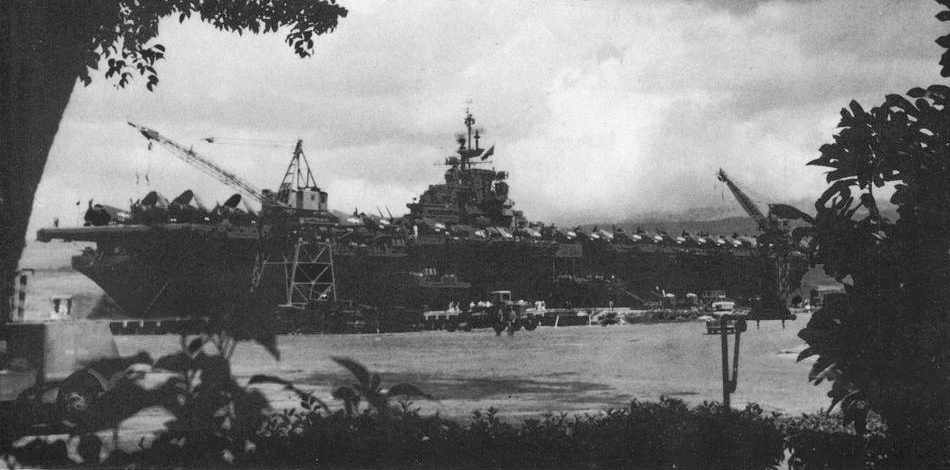
Randolph in port, 1945

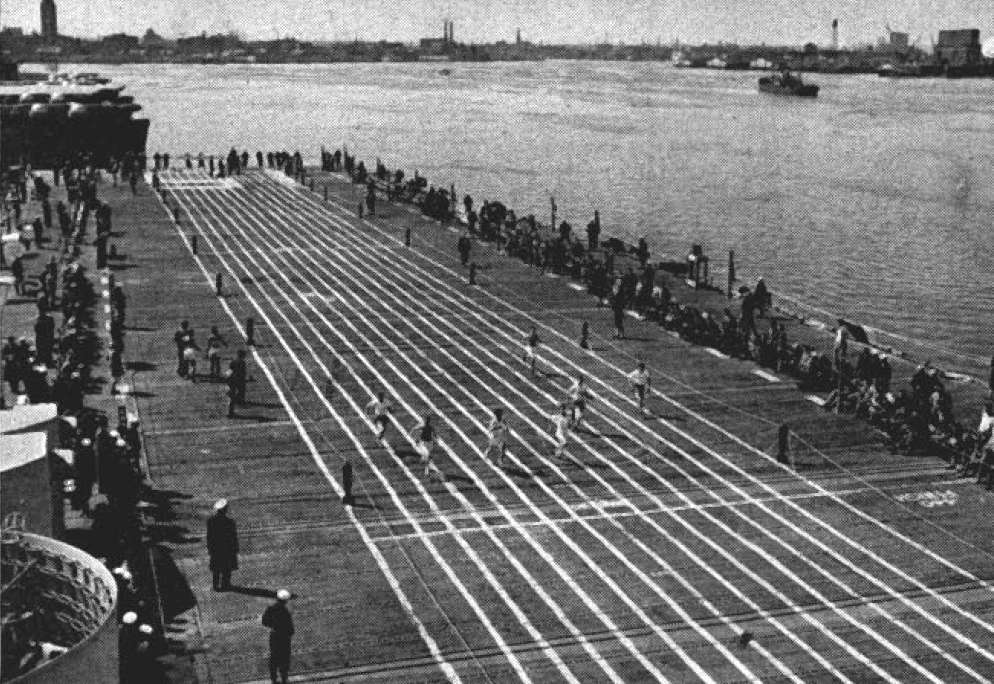
Track meet in Boston aboard Randolph in 1947

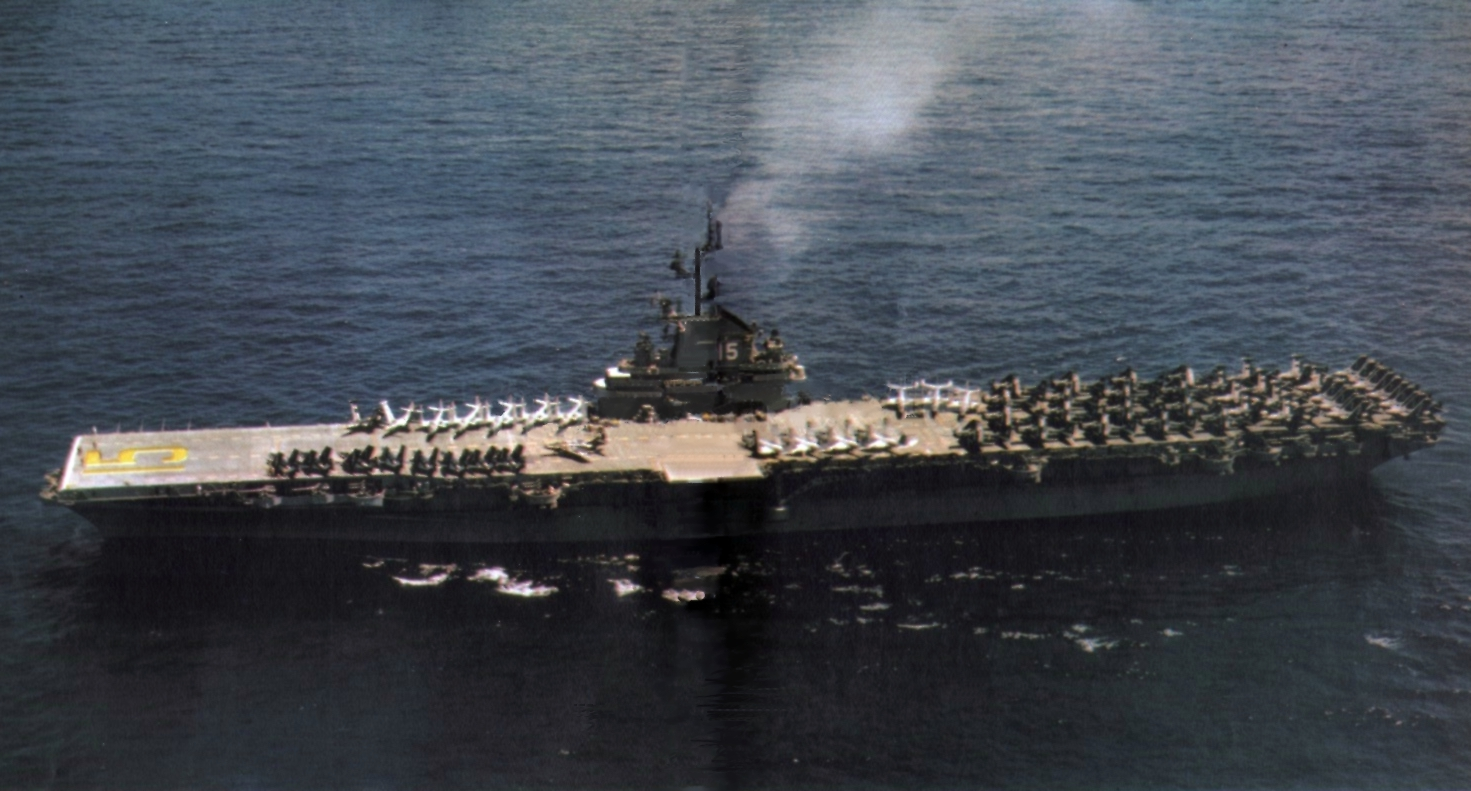
Randolph underway in 1954.jpg

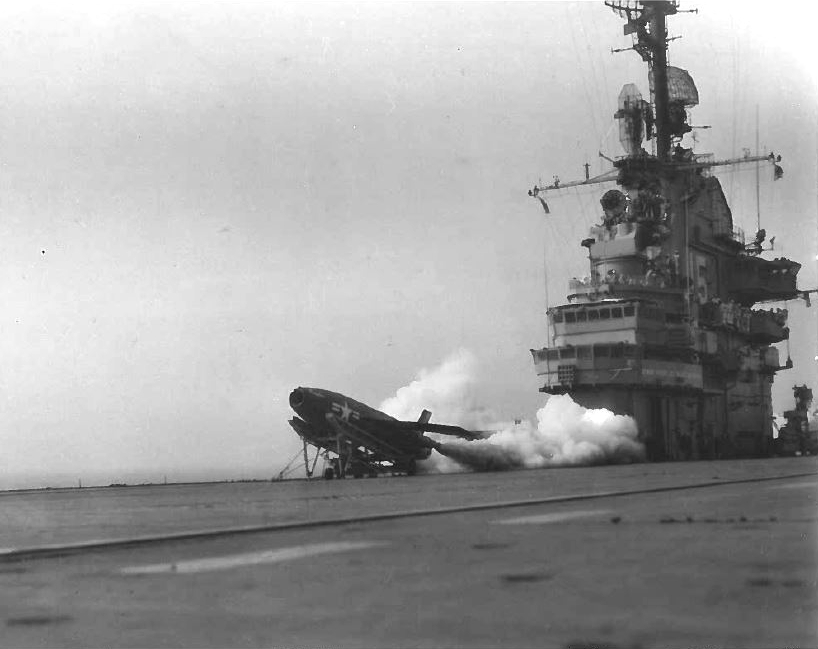
SSM-N-8 Regulus is launched from Randolph in early 1956

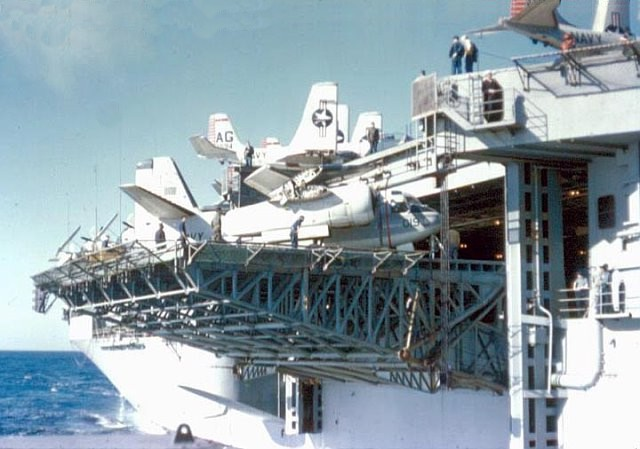
Starboard elevator of Randolph, 1958

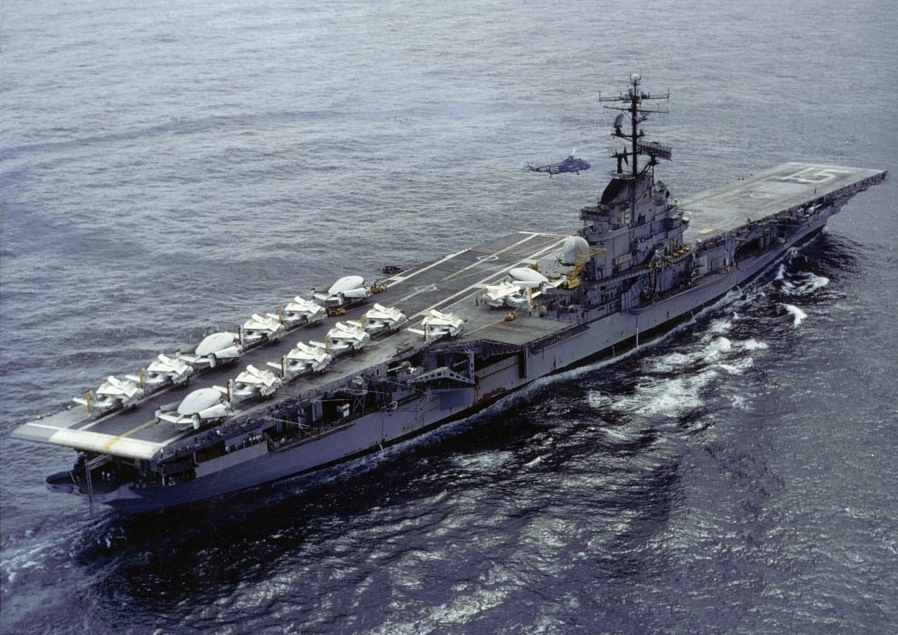
Randolph underway in 1967

== See also ==
- List of aircraft carriers
