= USS Jason (AR-8) =

Vulcan-class repair ship of the United States Navy

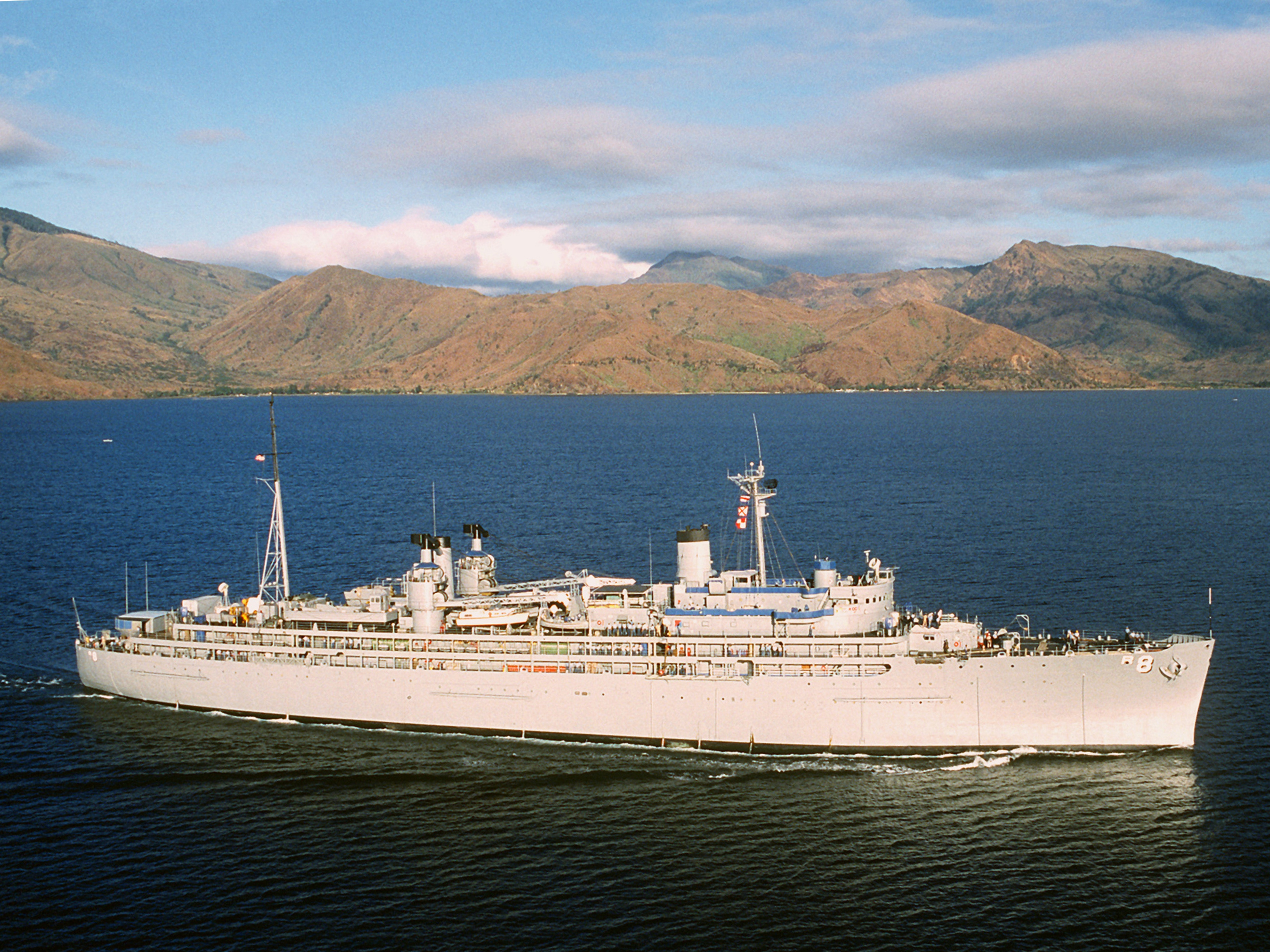
- USS Jason (AR-8) in 1993

History

United States
- Name: USS Jason
- Namesake: Jason
- Builder: Los Angeles Shipbuilding and Dry Dock Company, San Pedro, California
- Laid down: 9 March 1942
- Launched: 3 April 1943
- Commissioned: 19 June 1944
- Decommissioned: 24 June 1995
- Reclassified: AR-8, 9 September 1957
- Stricken: 24 June 1995
- Motto: Ready Willing Able
- Nickname(s): Jolly J
- Honors and awards: Korean Service Medal; 3 campaign stars (Vietnam)
- Fate: Scrapped, 2007

General characteristics
- Class & type: Vulcan class repair ship
- Displacement: 9,430 long tons (9,581 t) light; 17,000 long tons (17,273 t) full
- Length: 530 ft (160 m)
- Beam: 77 ft (23 m)
- Draft: 26 ft (7.9 m)
- Propulsion: 4 × Babcock Wilcox Express A Type 400psi Boilers, 2 × steam turbines, 2 propeller shafts, 11,000 shp (8,203 kW)
- Speed: 19.2 knots (35.6 km/h; 22.1 mph)
- Complement: 1,297
- Armament: 4 × single 5"/38 Mark 12 (removed 1979); 4 x twin 40mm/56.3 Mark 1 Bofors; 23 × single 20mm/70 Mark 2 Oerlikon

USS Jason (AR-8) was the fourth of the Vulcan class repair ship of the United States Navy in service from 1944 to 1995, serving in World War II, Korea, Vietnam, and the Gulf War. At the time of her decommissioning, Jason was (with the exception of USS Constitution) the oldest ship in continual commission in the United States Navy, and the final ship in continual commission from World War II onward.

== World War II, Pacific Theatre operations ==
She was laid down on 9 March 1942, at Los Angeles Shipbuilding and Dry Dock Company, San Pedro, California, as Heavy-hull Repair Ship ARH-1, and launched on 3 April 1943. Jason was commissioned on 19 June 1944.

After brief shakedown and fitting out, the repair ship arrived Pearl Harbor on 6 July 1944 on the first leg of her journey to the Pacific battle area. She arrived Purvis Bay in the Solomon Islands on 17 August to commence operations with Service Squadron 10. Two months later she arrived Ulithi, where she was to spend the greater part of the war, performing the task of repairing U.S. Navy's ships.

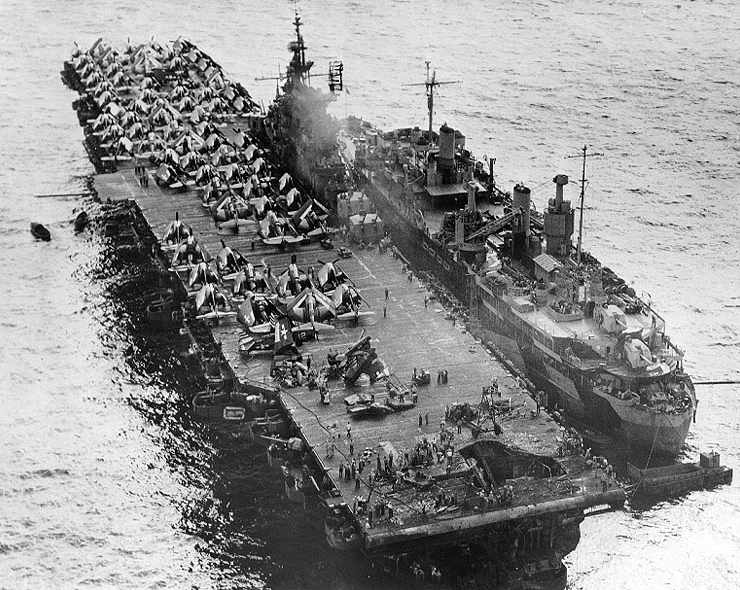
Jason assisting USS Randolph after a Kamikaze hit at Ulithi, 1945. Photographed from a USS Miami floatplane

For seven months at Ulithi, Jason repaired ships of every type in the U.S. Navy. Jason sailed for Leyte arriving there on 28 May 1945. She remained there for the duration of the war continuing to service ships of the Pacific Fleet.

== Post-World War II operations ==
After the surrender of Japan, she joined a convoy of units from the U.S. 7th Fleet and arrived Jinsen, Korea, on 8 September with the first occupation troops. She operated out of Jinsen, and Qingdao, China, until mid-February 1946, performing repair services and assisting in the evacuation of Japanese nationals. Jason returned to Terminal Island, California, on 9 March for overhaul. She sailed again in May for the Far East. For the next four years she serviced the U.S. Pacific Fleet, alternating between Japan and California.

== Korean War operations ==
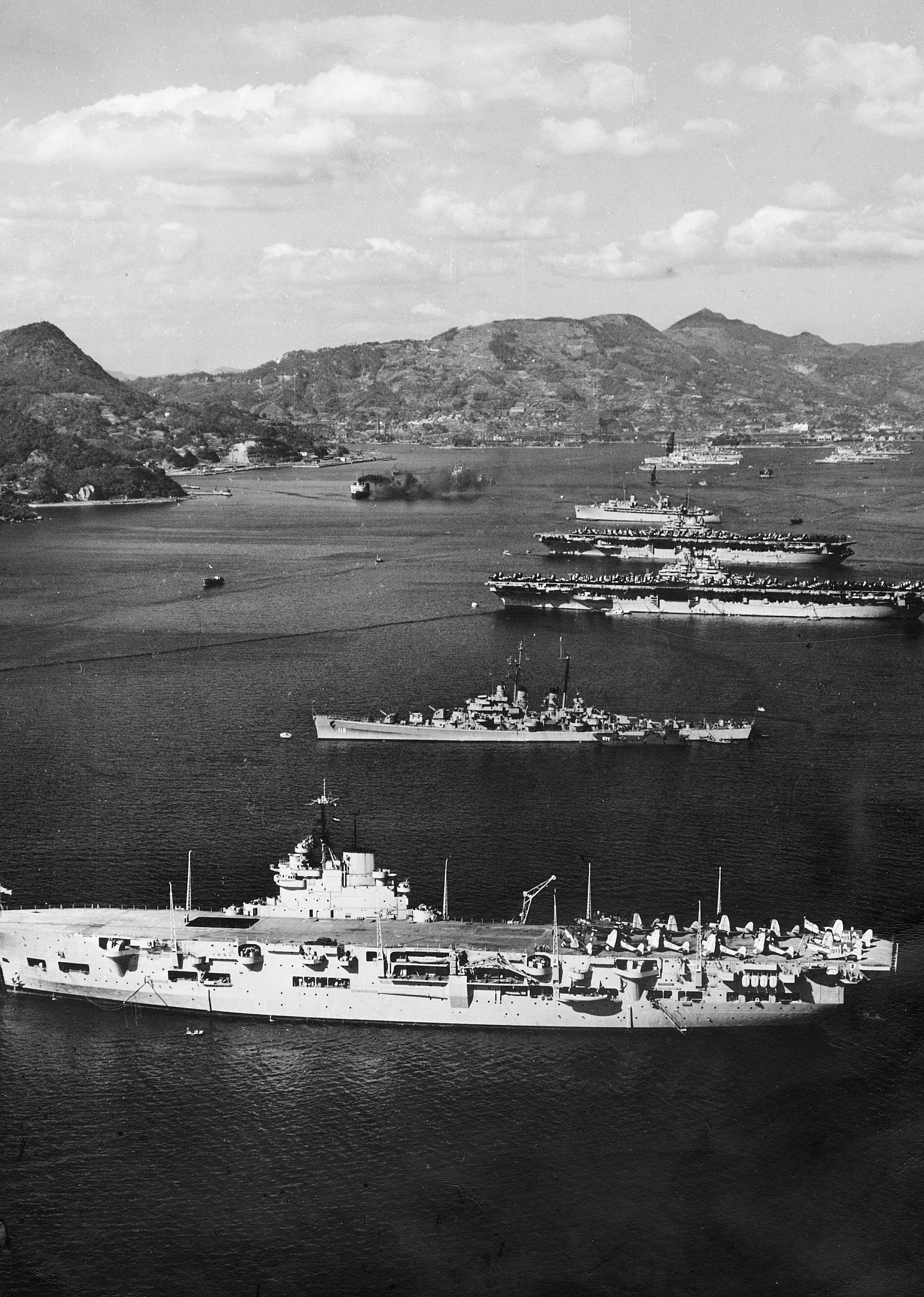
Jason with HMS Unicorn, Juneau, Valley Forge, Leyte and Hector at Sasebo, Japan, 1950.

Jason departed Oakland, California, on 22 July 1950 for Sasebo and immediately began service duties upon her arrival in August. Throughout the war she remained at Sasebo for extended periods performing the repair tasks at hand, with only brief overhaul periods in the United States.

Following the cessation of hostilities in Korea, Jason returned to San Diego, California, on 6 November 1953. Six months later she sailed for another WestPac deployment which included a goodwill tour to Chin Hae, Korea. It was during this cruise, that the Chinese Communists began to provoke the Nationalist-held Tachen Islands. The U.S. 7th Fleet, which Jason helped maintain, sent units into the area to make certain the peace was not violated. Jason returned to San Diego, California, on 13 February 1955 and commenced repair services off the West Coast of the United States.

Her next Far Eastern tour began January 1956, and she operated in Japan, Okinawa, and Formosa before returning to San Diego, in late October. While on still another deployment to Sasebo she was redesignated AR-8 on 9 September 1957. Following her return to San Diego on 14 February 1958, she operated there throughout the year.

== Vietnam War operations ==
Jason was dispatched to the Far East on 6 January 1959 and operated there until returning to San Diego, on 18 August.

Following her return to San Diego, on 7 March 1961, Jason operated along the West Coast of the United States providing repair services through 1962. Another deployment with WestPac began on 3 January 1963, with the growing insurgency in South Vietnam. She returned to San Diego on 7 July 1963, and serviced the U.S. Pacific Fleet along the West Coast through 1964.

== West Coast operations ==
Jason departed San Diego on 4 January 1965 and arrived at Yokosuka, Japan, on the 25th. After operations in Japan and at Okinawa, she reached Subic Bay 6 March and served ships of the 7th Fleet until heading home on 31 August. The repair ship operated in ports of southern California until entering the Naval Shipyard at Bremerton, Washington, for overhaul on 4 March 1966.

Back in top trim by 6 June, Jason resumed West Coast operations until sailing for the WestPac on 9 January 1967. She served the ships of the 7th Fleet at Sasebo and in Subic Bay until returning to San Diego, on 19 August.

Jason had her large guns removed to qualify it as a non-combatant ship, so women could become part of the ship's crew.

In October 1980, while home ported in San Diego, the Jason and her crew deployed for WestPac and Indian Ocean cruise in support of troops for the Iran hostage crisis. She deployed with approximately 800 men and 45 women. The Jason repaired ships in Yokosuka, Japan, for about a month, and after a Thanksgiving stop in Subic Bay, Philippines, (with a very brief stop at Singapore to drop off a crewmember needing immediate surgery for appendicitis) the Jason entered the Indian Ocean. She was met there by a Russian warship, an oiler and two merchant ships. Soon thereafter she picked up the tail of a Russian submarine.

Anchoring at Diego Garcia the Jason became the floating pier in the middle of the bay. She remained there repairing both ships and submarines. Jason returned to San Diego soon after, with a brief stop in Fremantle, Western Australia, on 27 February 1981 with four-day R&R in the city of Perth, and a resupply at Pearl Harbor.

Soon the crew was to receive word that the Jason would be moving homeports to Pearl Harbor. The Jason was to replace the Bryce Canyon as the tender for the harbor. Captain Johnson was replaced by Captain Martin, the former CO of the Bryce Canyon. While stationed at "Pearl" the Jason underwent an overhaul costing several millions of dollars. The crew moved ashore for the overhaul and upon return had to requalify to take her to sea. In 1983 the Jason deployed for West Pac 1983 to Yokosuka and Sasebo, Japan, Olongapo, Philippines, and to Pusan, S.Korea.

On 10 February 1986, Jason was run into by the oiler USS Willamette about 100 km southwest of Pearl Harbor, while steaming across and through a formation centered around Willamette, in an attempt to take up a position in the formation astern of Willamette. One crewmember was killed and eight others of Jason's crew were injured. A large vertical rupture from the deck to waterline on the port side of the Jason forced the ship to be towed back to port by the USS Brunswick. As a result of the collision both captains were relieved of command. Following repairs, Jason moved to a new home port in San Diego. By this time the Jason was the most decorated ship in the Navy.

== Gulf War operations ==
When Operation Desert Shield began in August 1990, Jason's operating schedule was accelerated to allow for deployment as soon as possible. Under Captain Roy Tobin, the Jason departed for the Persian Gulf in early December, arriving with an amphibious assault force off the coast of Oman on 14 January 1991 – the day before Congress had authorized the use of force to drive Iraqi forces out of Kuwait.

Two weeks into the Air War, the Jason moved into the Persian Gulf, mooring pierside along with other US and Coalition ships in Manama, Bahrain, in support of Operation Desert Storm. Ballistic missile alerts were common over the next few weeks, until the cessation of hostilities on 28 February.

The Jason played a vital role in the emergency repair of the two warships that suffered mine damage in the Persian Gulf, the Tripoli and the Princeton. The Battle Damage Assessment and Repair teams that flew out to the crippled ships earned combat action awards for their service in Desert Storm – including the first combat action awards ever earned by female sailors. Additionally, a Battle Damage Assessment Team went ashore in Kuwait and recorded damage to their designated area of responsibility. The personnel included in this team also earned combat action awards.

== Awards ==
- Combat Action Ribbon – (1944–1945)
- Navy Unit Commendation – (Dec 1969-Jan 1970); (Jan-Feb 1991) Gulf War
- Navy Meritorious Unit Commendation – (Jan-Oct 1991) Gulf War
- Navy E Ribbon – (1968, 1974, 1976, 1979, 1988, 1989, 1991, 1994)
- Navy Expeditionary Medal – (Dec 1980-Feb 1981)
- China Service Medal
- American Campaign Medal
- Asiatic-Pacific Campaign Medal
- World War II Victory Medal
- Navy Occupation Service Medal (with Asia clasp)
- National Defense Service Medal(3rd)
- Korean Service Medal
- Southwest Asia Service Medal – (Jan-Apr 1991) Gulf War
- Humanitarian Service Medal – (May-Jun 1976) Typhoon Pamela (1976)
- Philippine Republic Presidential Unit Citation
- Republic of Korea Presidential Unit Citation
- Philippines Liberation Medal
- United Nations Service Medal
- Kuwait Liberation Medal (Kuwait)
- Kuwait Liberation Medal (Kingdom of Saudi Arabia)

Jason earned three campaign stars for Vietnam War service:

- Vietnamese Counteroffensive-Phase V Campaign, 25 July to 16 August 1968
- Vietnam Winter-Summer 1970 Campaign, 27 December 1969 to 21 January 1970
- Vietnamese Counteroffensive-Phase VII Campaign, 23 March to 13 April 1971

Captain Edward F. Ney Memorial Award – (1974, 3rd place)

== Decommissioning ==
Jason was decommissioned, struck from the Naval Vessel Register on 24 June 1995, and transferred to the Maritime Administration for lay up in the National Defense Reserve Fleet, Suisun Bay, Benicia, California. On 9 November 2006 a contract was awarded to Marine Metal Inc. of Brownsville, Texas for her scrapping. Jason was removed from the National Defense Reserve Fleet, Suisun Bay Group, on 8 January 2007.

Preceded by Undetermined	Oldest active ship of the United States Navy; TBD - 1995	Succeeded by USS Independence (CV-62)
