= List of military electronics of the United States: A–G =

This subpage lists American military electronic instruments/systems along with brief descriptions. This stand-alone list specifically identifies electronic devices which are assigned designations (names) according to the Joint Electronics Type Designation System (JETDS) beginning with the AN/ prefix. They are grouped below by the first designation letter following this prefix. The list is organized as sorted tables that reflect the purpose, uses, and manufacturers of each listed item.

The list on this page only shows designations where the first letter after AN/ is between A and G. For all designations between M and Z, please see List of military electronics of the United States: M–Z.

NOTE: Letters E, H, I, J, L, N, O, Q, R, X, and Y are not used in the first-position of JETDS nomenclatures.

AN/:
- Top
- A
- B
- C
- D
- F
- G
- M–Z
- See also
- Notes
- References
- Bibliography
- Further reading
- External links
- Main list

== A ==
=== AAx – Piloted aircraft invisible light/Heat radiation systems ===
AN/AAA – Airborne infrared auxiliary assembly systems
Designation	Purpose/Description	Location/Used by	Manufacturer
AN/AAA-3	Receiver group, paired with AN/AAS-15	F-8 Crusader	
AN/AAA-4	Infrared search and track (IRST) surveillance and targeting system	F-4B Phantom II	ACF Industries, Texas Instruments

AN/AAD – Airborne Infrared Direction Finding/Reconnaissance/Surveillance Systems
Designation	Purpose/Description	Location/Used by	Manufacturer
AN/AAD-4	Forward-looking infrared (FLIR) reconnaissance set, part of Surprise Package modifications	AC-119K Stinger, AC-130 Spectre, RF-4B Phantom II	Texas Instruments
AN/AAD-5	Infrared (IR) reconnaissance set, replaced the AN/AAD-4	AC-130 Spectre, RF-4B Phantom II, RF-4C Phantom II, RF-111C, F-14 Tomcat	Honeywell Aerospace
AN/AAD-6	Forward-looking infrared (FLIR), part of Pave Pronto modifications with improved detectors, replaced AN/AAD-4	AC-130H Spectre	
AN/AAD-7	Forward-looking infrared (FLIR) detection set, replaced by AN/AAQ-17	AC-130H Spectre	Texas Instruments

AN/AAM – Airborne infrared maintenance and test sets systems
Designation	Purpose/Description	Location/Used by	Manufacturer
AN/AAM-4	Infrared (IR) Equipment test bench harness for the infrared detecting set AN/AAS-15; used with AN/AAA-4		Hughes Aircraft
AN/AAM-5	Infrared (IR) target simulator for the infrared detecting set AN/AAS-15		Hughes Aircraft
AN/AAM-6	Infrared (IR) test set for the infrared detecting set AN/AAS-15		Hughes Aircraft
AN/AAM-10	Thermal test target for AN/AAS-51A		
AN/AAM-12	Infrared (IR) detector test set for AN/AAS-14		
AN/AAM-13	Optical test table for AN/AAS-14		
AN/AAM-21	Cathode-ray tube test set		Texas Instruments
AN/AAM-26	Video signal generator for AN/TAQ-14		
AN/AAM-29	Cryogenic refrigerator test set, used with AN/AAS-14		
AN/AAM-30	Resolution test set, used with AN/AAS-24	OV-1 Mohawk	
AN/AAM-31	Detecting set receiver test set, used with AN/AAS-24	OV-1 Mohawk	
AN/AAM-32	Recorder film magazine test set, used with AN/AAS-24	OV-1 Mohawk	
AN/AAM-33	Recorder film magazine test set, used with AN/AAS-24	OV-1 Mohawk	
AN/AAM-34	Power supply control panel test set, used with AN/AAS-24	OV-1 Mohawk	
AN/AAM-35	Converter sub-sssembly test set, used with AN/AAS-24	OV-1 Mohawk	
AN/AAM-36	Optical alignment test set, used with AN/AAS-24	OV-1 Mohawk	
AN/AAM-37	Cryogenic refrigerator test set, used with AN/AAS-24	OV-1 Mohawk	
AN/AAM-38	Infrared (IR) detection set test set, used with AN/AAS-24	OV-1 Mohawk	
AN/AAM-39	Electrical circuit test set, used with AN/AAS-24	OV-1 Mohawk	
AN/AAM-40	Refrigerator test set, used with AN/AAS-24	OV-1 Mohawk	
AN/AAM-55	Airborne laser tracking test set, used with AN/AAS-32 laser tracker		
AN/AAM-56	Airborne laser tracking alignment test set, used with AN/AAS-32 laser tracker		
AN/AAM-60	Electro-optical (EO) system test set	A-6 Intruder, A-7 Corsair II, P-3C Orion, S-3 Viking, OV-1D Mohawk	
AN/AAM-102	Electro-optical (EO) systems test stand for performance testing AN/AAR-44 energy detection assembly cooler		

AN/AAQ – Airborne infrared special/combination systems
Designation	Purpose/Description	Location/Used by	Manufacturer
AN/AAQ-4	Active Infrared (IR) Countermeasures (IRCM) system using a visual cesium infrared source, forerunner of AN/AAQ-8	B/EB-66C/E Destroyer, B-52 Stratofortress, HH-53 Super Jolly Green Giant, RF-4C Phantom II	Hallicrafters, Northrop Grumman
AN/AAQ-5	Forward Looking Infrared (FLIR) Sighting System Passive Infra-red (SSPI) sensor turret	UH-1M Iroquois, AH-1 Cobra	Aerojet Electro-Systems
AN/AAQ-6	Forward Looking Infrared (FLIR), paired with AN/AVQ-22 to form the AN/ASQ-151	B-52G/H Stratofortress	Hughes Aircraft
AN/AAQ-7	Low Light Level Television (LLLTV) laser illuminator subsystem	AC-130H Spectre	
AN/AAQ-8	200 lb (91 kg) pod-mounted active Infrared (IR) Countermeasures (IRCM) using a visual cesium infrared source, development of AN/AAQ-4	A-7D Corsair II, C-130 Hercules, F-4 Phantom II, F-5 Tiger, HH-53 Super Jolly Green Giant, RF-4C Phantom II	Hallicrafters, Northrop Grumman
AN/AAQ-9	Pave Tack Forward Looking Infrared (FLIR) imaging module, part of AN/AVQ-26	F-111 Aardvark, A-10 Thunderbolt II, F-4 Phantom II, RF-4C Phantom II	Texas Instruments
AN/AAQ-10	Forward Looking Infrared (FLIR) system	MH-53J Pave Low III, MC-130E Combat Talon	Texas Instruments
AN/AAQ-11	549.4 lb (249.2 kg) Pilot Night Vision System portion of TADS/PNVS Forward Looking Infrared (FLIR), used with AN/ASQ-170, replaced by Apache Arrowhead system	AH-64D Apache	Lockheed Martin
AN/AAQ-12	Target Acquisition Designation Sight/Pilot Night Vision Sensor TADS/PNVS Forward Looking Infrared (FLIR) turreted sensor for target acquisition, range-finding and target illumination using laser-guided missiles	AH-64 Apache	Martin Marietta
AN/AAQ-13	450 lb (200 kg) K_{u}-band terrain-following radar and Forward Looking Infrared (FLIR) navigation pod, part of LANTIRN	F-15E Strike Eagle, F-16 Fighting Falcon	Lockheed Martin
AN/AAQ-14	551 lb (250 kg) Forward Looking Infrared (FLIR) laser designation targeting pod, part of LANTIRN	F-15E Strike Eagle, F-16 Fighting Falcon	Lockheed Martin
AN/AAQ-16	102.3 lb (46.4 kg) long-wavelength 8–15 μm infrared (LWIR) FLIR Airborne Electro-optical Special Operations Payload (AESOP) navigation and target designator/rangefinder, replaced by AN/AAQ-27	CH-47D Chinook, CH-53 Sea Stallion, CH-53E Super Stallion, MH-47 Chinook, MH-53J Pave Low III, MH-60G Pave Hawk, MH-60K Black Hawk, MH-60L Black Hawk, OH-6 Cayuse, SH-2F Seasprite, SH-2G Super Seasprite, SH-60B Seahawk	Hughes Aircraft, Raytheon
AN/AAQ-17	152 lb (69 kg) Infrared Detection Set (IDS), replaced AN/AAD-7, replaced by AN/AAQ-26	A-10 Thunderbolt II, AC-130H Spectre, AC-130U Spooky II, B-52 Stratofortress, SH-60B Seahawk	Texas Instruments, Raytheon
AN/AAQ-19	Sharpshooter pod-mounted laser designation and Forward Looking Infrared (FLIR) system included in LANTIRN, (export only system) simplified AN/AAQ-14	F-15E Strike Eagle, F-16 Fighting Falcon	Lockheed Martin
AN/AAQ-20	Pathfinder pod-mounted navigation system, (export only system) simplified AN/AAQ-13	F-15E Strike Eagle, F-16 Fighting Falcon	Lockheed Martin
AN/AAQ-21	Star SAFIRE (shipborne, airborne forward-looking infrared equipment) Forward Looking Infrared (FLIR) pod		Teledyne FLIR
AN/AAQ-22	Star SAFIRE II (shipborne, airborne forward-looking infrared equipment) Forward Looking Infrared (FLIR) pod	C-130 Hercules, P-3 Orion, UH-1H Iroquois, MH-60G Pave Hawk	Teledyne FLIR
AN/AAQ-24	Nemisis Directional Infrared (IR) Countermeasures (DIRCM), used with AN/AAR-54	AC-130U Spooky II, C-17 Globemaster III, CH-53E Super Stallion, CV-22 Osprey, Lockheed MC-130, MH-53M Pave Low IV	Northrop Grumman
AN/AAQ-25	Low Altitude Navigation and Targeting, Infrared, for Night (LANTIRN) targeting pod	F-14 Tomcat	Lockheed Martin
AN/AAQ-26	Infrared (IR) detection set, replaced AN/AAQ-17	AC-130H Spectre, AC-130U Spooky II	Raytheon
AN/AAQ-27	93 lb (42 kg) third-generation mid-wavelength 3–8 μm infrared (MWIR), Forward Looking Infrared (FLIR) imaging, navigation, surveillance and targeting system with an Indium antimonide (InSb) staring focal plane array, replaced AN/AAQ-16	SH-2G Super Seasprite, V-22 Osprey	Raytheon
AN/AAQ-28	LITENING forward-looking infrared (FLIR) targeting pod	A-10C Thunderbolt II, AV-8B Harrier II Plus, EA-6B Prowler, F-15E Strike Eagle, F-16 Fighting Falcon, F/A-18 Hornet	Rafael Advanced Defense Systems
AN/AAQ-32	Internal FLIR Targeting System (IFTS)	F-16 Fighting Falcon	Northrop Grumman
AN/AAQ-33	Sniper ATP (Advanced Targeting Pod)	A-10C Thunderbolt II, F-16 Fighting Falcon, F-15E Strike Eagle, B-1B Lancer, B-52H Stratofortress	Lockheed Martin
AN/AAQ-37	Electro-optical Distributed Aperture System (EODAS)	F-35 Lightning II	Northrop Grumman
AN/AAQ-39	Electro-optical/Infrared (IR) fire-control system	AC-130U Spooky II	Lockheed Martin
AN/AAQ-40	Electro-optical Targeting System (EOTS) equivalent to Sniper Extended Range (XR)	F-35 Lightning II	Lockheed Martin

AN/AAR – Airborne Infrared Receiver/Passive Detection Systems
Designation	Purpose/Description	Location/Used By	Manufacturer
AN/AAR-4	Infrared search and track (IRST) tail warning system	F-100 Super Sabre	RCA Corp, Hughes Aircraft
AN/AAR-5	Forward Looking Infrared (IR) (FLIR) system		RCA Corp
AN/AAR-31	Infrared (IR) detection set for anti-submarine warfare	P-3 Orion, S-3 Viking	Barnes Engineering
AN/AAR-34	Infrared (IR) tail-mounted tracking and missile approach warning system (MAWS)	F-111 Aardvark	Cincinnati Electronics
AN/AAR-37	Infrared (IR) detection set	P-3A/B/C Orion, EP-3E Aries	Hughes Aircraft
AN/AAR-38	Compass Cool Infrared (IR) warning sensor	FB-111 Aardvark, F-15 Eagle, F/A-18 Hornet	Cincinnati Electronics
AN/AAR-40	Forward Looking Infrared (IR) (FLIR) system	C-141B Starlifter, P-3A/B/C Orion	
AN/AAR-42	Forward Looking Infrared (FLIR) system	A-7E Corsair II, A-10 Thunderbolt II	Texas Instruments
AN/AAR-43	Infrared (IR) warning receiver	A-7E Corsair II	Aerojet
AN/AAR-44	Infrared (IR) warning receiver	AC-130U Spooky II	Cincinnati Electronics
AN/AAR-45	Low-Altitude Night Attack (LANA) Forward Looking Infrared (FLIR) system	A-6E Intruder, A-7E Corsair II	
AN/AAR-46	Passive ultraviolet (UV) missile detector	CH-46 Sea Knight	
AN/AAR-47	Missile Approach Warning System	CH-46D/E Sea Knight, CH-53A/D/E Sea Stallion, HV-22 Osprey, MH-60R Seahawk, MH-60K Black Hawk, MH-60R Seahawk, MV-22B Osprey, OV-10A/D Bronco, SH-2G Super Seasprite, SH-60 Seahawk, U-28 Draco, UH-1 Iroquois	Honeywell, Loral Corp
AN/AAR-50	214 lb (97 kg) low altitude visual Navigation FLIR (NAVFLIR) pod (originally called TINS or Thermal Imaging Navigation Set) with automatic target recognition, derived from AN/AAQ-16, replaced by AN/ASQ-228 ATFLIR	AV-8B Harrier II Plus, F/A-18C/D Hornet	Hughes Electronics, Raytheon
AN/AAR-54	Passive ultraviolet (UV) Missile Approach Warning System (MAWS), part of AN/AAQ-24	B-2 Spirit, C-130 Hercules	Westinghouse Electronic Systems
AN/AAR-56	Infrared spherical Missile Launch Detection (MLD) system	F-22 Raptor	
AN/AAR-57	49.2 lb (22.3 kg) Common Missile Warning System (CMWS) 1 to 4 μm passive detection staring focal plane array missile detection/warning, either stand-alone or a component of AN/ALQ-212 ATIRCM/CMWS self-protection suite	AH-64 Apache, C-23 Sherpa, CH-47 Chinook, MH-47D Chinook, MH-60K Black Hawk, RC-12 Guardrail, UC-35 Citation, UH-60 Black Hawk	BAE

AN/AAS – Airborne Infrared Detection/Range and Bearing Search Systems
Designation	Purpose/Description	Location/Used By	Manufacturer
AN/AAS-1	Redbird Infrared (IR) Scanner	B-26 Marauder	Bell Sound Systems
AN/AAS-14	Infrared (IR) mapping sensor, part of AN/UAS-4	OV-1C Mohawk	HRB-Singer
AN/AAS-15	Infrared search and track (IRST) system, paired with AN/AAA-3	F-8 Crusader	
AN/AAS-18	Infrared (IR) reconnaissance set	RF-4B Phantom II, RB-57 Canberra	Texas Instruments
AN/AAS-21	Infrared (IR) reconnaissance mapper	RA-5C Vigilante	
AN/AAS-24	Real-time infrared (IR) terrain imaging set	OV-1D Mohawk	Texas Instruments
AN/AAS-26	Forward Looking Infrared (FLIR)	B-57G Canberra Tropic Moon III	
AN/AAS-27	Downward-Looking infrared (IR) mapping system		Honeywell
AN/AAS-28	Infrared (IR) detection system	A-6 Intruder	Texas Instruments
AN/AAS-29	Night Vision Set	UH-1H Iroquois	Hughes Aircraft
AN/AAS-32	Airborne Laser Tracker (ALT)	AH-1G HueyCobra, OH-58 Kiowa	
AN/AAS-33	Less than 500 lb (230 kg) gyro-stabilized Target Recognition and Attack Multi-sensor (TRAM) Detection and Ranging System (DRS) electro-optical target acquisition laser designator, used with AN/APQ-156	A-6E Intruder, TC-4C Academe	Hughes Electronics
AN/AAS-35	Pave Penny 30 lb (14 kg) integrated Target Identification Set, Laser (TISL) passive 1.06 μm targeting pod using a gimbal-mounted PIN diode sensor for day/night close air support roles, based on AN/AVQ-11, forerunner of AN/ASQ-173	A-4 Skyhawk, A-7D Corsair II, A-7K Corsair II, A-10A Thunderbolt II, F-16 Fighting Falcon, F-111 Aardvark, OV-10 Bronco	Lockheed Martin
AN/AAS-36	Forward Looking Infrared (FLIR) detection set	P-3C Orion	Texas Instruments
AN/AAS-38	Nite Hawk 430 lb (200 kg) Forward Looking Infrared (FLIR) laser target designator/rangefinder pod operating at a wavelength of 1064 nm, used with AN/AAS-50, replaced by AN/ASQ-228 ATFLIR	F/A-18 Hornet, F-14 Tomcat, SH-60B Seahawk	Lockheed Martin
AN/AAS-42	Tiger Eyes Infrared search and track (IRST) system	SH-60B Seahawk, F-14D Super Tomcat F/A-18E/F Super Hornet	Lockheed Martin
AN/AAS-44	Multi-spectral targeting system	MH-60R Seahawk, MH-60S Knighthawk	Raytheon
AN/AAS-46	Targeting Forward-Looking Infrared (TFLIR), forerunner to AN/ASQ-228 ATFLIR	F/A-18E/F Super Hornet	Raytheon
AN/AAS-50	Navigation Forward Looking Infrared (FLIR) pod, used with AN/AAS-38	F/A-18C/D Hornet	
AN/AAS-52	Multi-spectral targeting system (MTS-A)	MQ-1 Predator, MQ-1C Gray Eagle, MQ-9 Reaper, U-28 Draco	Raytheon

AN/AAT – Airborne Infrared Transmission Systems
Designation	Purpose/Description	Location/Used By	Manufacturer
AN/AAT-3	Ambient laser illuminator	AC-130H Spectre	

=== ACx – Piloted Aircraft Carrier Communications Systems ===
AN/ACC – Airborne Carrier Communication Systems
Designation	Purpose/Description	Location/Used By	Manufacturer
AN/ACC-1	Solid-state low band 3-channel multiplexer/demultiplexer, used with AN/ARC-89	Post Attack Command and Control System (PACCS)	Electronic Communications, Inc
AN/ACC-2	4-channel multiplexer, used with AN/ARC-89	Post Attack Command and Control System (PACCS)	
AN/ACC-3	Voice communications 51-channel frequency-division multiplexer, weighing 1,825 lb (828 kg)	Post Attack Command and Control System (PACCS), E-4B NEACP	Electronic Communications, Inc. (ECI)
AN/ACC-6	90-channel frequency-division multiplexer, used with AN/ART-42	Boeing EC-135	E-Systems

AN/ACQ – Airborne Carrier Special/Combination Systems
Designation	Purpose/Description	Location/Used By	Manufacturer
AN/ACQ-5	High-speed TADIL-A/Link 11 capable solid-state serial-bit-stream digital data modem transmitter over HF or UHF radio	P-3C Orion	Sylvania

=== ADx – Piloted Aircraft Radioactivity Detection, Identification, and Computation (RADIAC) Systems ===
AN/ADR – Airborne Radiac Receiver/Passive Detection Systems
Designation	Purpose/Description	Location/Used By	Manufacturer
AN/ADR-6	Aerial Radiac System (ARS) for nuclear radiation measurement, preprograms terrain factors and automatically records altitude and airspeed	OV-1 Mohawk	North American Rockwell

=== AEx – Piloted Aircraft Laser Systems ===
AN/AES – Airborne Laser Detection/Range and Bearing Search Systems
Designation	Purpose/Description	Location/Used By	Manufacturer
AN/AES-1	805 lb (365 kg) Airborne Laser Mine Detection System (ALMDS) pod using LIDAR technology in littoral waters to detect, classify, and localize floating and near-surface moored mines, capable of generating topographic view of the ocean floor, paired with AN/ASQ-235	MH-60S Knighthawk	Northrop Grumman

=== AIx – Piloted Aircraft Interphone/Public Address Systems ===
AN/AIC – Airborne Interphone/Public Address Communications Systems
Designation	Purpose/Description	Location/Used By	Manufacturer
AN/AIC-10	Interphone system		
AN/AIC-14	Interphone system	UH-3H Sea King	
AN/AIC-18	Interphone system	C-130T Hercules	
AN/AIC-23	Private interphone system		
AN/AIC-25	Interphone system	C-130T Hercules	

=== AJx – Piloted Aircraft Electromechanical/Inertial Systems ===
AN/AJB – Airborne Electromechanical/Inertial Bombing Systems
Designation	Purpose/Description	Location/Used By	Manufacturer
AN/AJB-3	Loft/toss bombing computer system	A-4 Skyhawk, F-4B Phantom II	Lear Siegler, Texas Instruments
AN/AJB-7	Altitude-reference and bombing computer set (ARBCS), used with AN/ASQ-91	F-4D Phantom II	Lear Siegler

AN/AJN – Airborne Electromechanical/Inertial Navigation Systems
Designation	Purpose/Description	Location/Used By	Manufacturer
AN/AJN-16	Inertial Bomb-Navigation computer, replaced AN/AJQ-20	F-111 Aardvark	Rockwell International

AN/AJQ – Airborne Electromechanical/Inertial Special/Combination Systems
Designation	Purpose/Description	Location/Used By	Manufacturer
AN/AJQ-20	Inertial Bomb-Navigation computer, replaced by AN/AJN-16	F-111 Aardvark	Litton Industries

=== ALx – Piloted Aircraft Countermeasures Systems ===
AN/ALE – Airborne Countermeasures Ejection/Release Systems
Designation	Purpose/Description	Location/Used By	Manufacturer
AN/ALE-20	Flare dispenser with 16 flare expendables	B-52 Stratofortress, B-58 Hustler	
AN/ALE-24	Chaff dispenser with 140 chaff bundles	B-52 Stratofortress	Lundy
AN/ALE-28	Chaff/flare dispenser set	F-111 Aardvark	General Dynamics
AN/ALE-29	Chaff/flare dispenser with up to 30 pyrotechnic cartridges filled with dipole reflectors or infrared traps, forerunner of AN/ALE-39	A-6 Intruder, A-7 Corsair II, EA-6B Prowler, F-4B/N/J/S Phantom II, F-5E Tiger II, F-14A Tomcat, F-111 Aardvark	Tracor
AN/ALE-32	Chaff/flare dispenser pod	EA-6A Intruder, EA-6B Prowler	
AN/ALE-33	Chaff/flare dispenser for unpiloted aircraft		Lundy
AN/ALE-38	Pod-mounted dipole chaff dispenser laying corridors of chaff effectively jamming signals from 2–6 GHz (15.0–5.0 cm) and 10–18 GHz (3.0–1.7 cm) up to 80 nmi (92 mi; 150 km) long	EB-66 Destroyer, F-4 Phantom II, F-105F Thunderchief	
AN/ALE-39	Chaff/flare dispenser with 30 expendables, improved AN/ALE-29, replaced by AN/ALE-47	A-4 Skyhawk, A-6 Intruder, A-7 Corsair II, AH-1 SuperCobra, AV-8B Harrier II Plus, F-14A Tomcat, F-14B Tomcat, F-14D Super Tomcat, F/A-18 Hornet, MH-60R Seahawk, SH-2G Super Seasprite, SH-60 Seahawk, UH-1N Twin Huey, CH-53 Sea Stallion	BAE
AN/ALE-40	Chaff/flare countermeasures dispenser system, with 30 pyrotechnic cartridges filled with reflectors or 15 filled with infrared traps forerunner of AN/ALE-47	A-10 Thunderbolt II, C-130 Hercules, B-1B Lancer, C-130 Hercules, C-141 Starlifter, F-4 Phantom II, F-5E/F Tiger II, F-14 Tomcat, F-16 Fighting Falcon, F-104 Starfighter, F-111 Aardvark, FB-111 Aardvark, Lockheed HC-130, MC-130H Combat Talon II, MH-60G Pave Hawk, RF-4 Phantom II	
AN/ALE-41	Chaff dispenser pod	EA-6A Intruder	
AN/ALE-43	External pod or internally-mounted high-capacity chaff cutter and dispenser which cuts fiberglass roving material for each dipole to a selectable length	EA-6B Prowler	Alliant Defense Electronics
AN/ALE-44	Lightweight chaff/flare dispensing pod carrying 32 expendables	Tactical, support, drones, and strike aircraft capable of supersonic flight	Southwest Aerospace
AN/ALE-45	49.5 lb (22.5 kg) microprocessor-controlled chaff/flare dispenser, part of Tactical Electronic Warfare System (TEWS)	F-15 Eagle	BAE
AN/ALE-47	"Smart" threat adaptive chaff/flare Countermeasure Dispenser System (CMDS) dispenser integrated aircraft with radar warning receivers for autonomous operation, improved AN/ALE-40, replaced AN/ALE-39	AC-130U Spooky II, C-17 Globemaster III, CH-47 Chinook, F-16 Fighting Falcon, F/A-18 Hornet, MH-60G Pave Hawk, UH-60 Black Hawk, and many others	Tracor
AN/ALE-49	Flare dispenser with a capacity of 12 flare expendables, used with AN/ALQ-161, integrated with AN/ASQ-184	B-1B Lancer	
AN/ALE-50	Little Buddy passive electronic countermeasure towed decoy	F-16 Fighting Falcon, F/A-18E/F Super Hornet, B-1B Lancer, RQ-4B Global Hawk	Raytheon
AN/ALE-55	Fiber-optic radar jamming and deception towed decoy, part of Integrated Defensive Electronic Countermeasures (IDECM) operating from 1–35 GHz (29.98–0.86 cm) working with AN/ALQ-214	AC-130U Spooky II, F/A-18E/F Super Hornet, F/A-18E/F Super Hornet, F-15 Eagle, F-16 Fighting Falcon, MC-130H Combat Talon II	BAE

AN/ALH – Airborne Countermeasures Recording/Reproducing Systems
Designation	Purpose/Description	Location/Used By	Manufacturer
AN/ALH-4	Electronic countermeasures magnetic recorder/reproducer	B-52 Stratofortress	Ampex

AN/ALQ – Airborne Countermeasures Special/Combination Systems
Designation	Purpose/Description	Location/Used By	Manufacturer
AN/ALQ-41	X-band electronic countermeasure system	A-4 Skyhawk, A-5 Vigilante, EA-6A Intruder	Sanders Associates
AN/ALQ-51	S-band radar jamming and deception electronic countermeasure system using range gate pull-off, frequency translation, inverse conical scan and angular deception techniques operating in the 2–4 GHz (15.0–7.5 cm) frequency range	A-4 Skyhawk	Sanders Associates
AN/ALQ-61	Passive electronic intelligence/electronic support measures (ELINT/ESM) reconnaissance sensor suite	RA-5C Vigilante	AIL Systems
AN/ALQ-71	Electronic countermeasure jamming pod operating in the 1–8 GHz (29.98–3.75 cm) range	A-7 Corsair II, AQM-34 Ryan Firebee, B-52 Stratofortress, F-4 Phantom II, F-101 Voodoo, F-105 Thunderchief, RB-66 Destroyer	General Electric
AN/ALQ-72	Electronic countermeasure jamming pod operating in the 1–8 GHz (29.98–3.75 cm) range	A-7 Corsair II, B-52 Stratofortress, F-4 Phantom II, F-101 Voodoo, F-105 Thunderchief, RB-66 Destroyer	
AN/ALQ-76	Electronic countermeasure jamming pod operating in the 2–8 GHz (14.99–3.75 cm) range	EA-6A Intruder, EA-6B Prowler, A-4E Skyhawk	
AN/ALQ-78	Pylon-mounted radar threat detection/surveillance/direction finding system with high-speed rotating omnidirectional antenna, replaced by AN/ALR-66	A-4 Skyhawk, A-6 Intruder, P-3C Orion	Loral Corp
AN/ALQ-81	Electronic countermeasure pod	A-7 Corsair II	
AN/ALQ-85	Signal surveillance receiver system	EA-6A Prowler	
AN/ALQ-86	Electronic countermeasure receiver/surveillance pod	EA-6A Intruder	Bunker Ramo
AN/ALQ-87	Electronic countermeasure FM barrage jamming pod operating in the 1–8 GHz (29.98–3.75 cm) range, replaced by AN/ALQ-119	AC-130 Spectre, F-4D Phantom II, F-4G Wild Weasel V, F-100 Super Sabre, F-101 Voodoo, F-105 Thunderchief, F-111 Aardvark,	General Electric
AN/ALQ-91	Internally mounted electronic countermeasure microwave communications link jamming system	A-4 Skyhawk, F-14 Tomcat	Sanders Associates, Magnavox
AN/ALQ-94	Internally mounted electronic countermeasure combined pulse mode and continuous wave (CW) deception and barrage jamming (trackbreaker) operating from 2–20 GHz (15.0–1.5 cm), replaced by AN/ALQ-137	F/EF-111A/E/F Aardvark	Sanders Associates
AN/ALQ-98	Internally mounted C-band broadband noise jammer system	A-3 Skywarrior	General Instrument
AN/ALQ-99	Tactical Jamming System (TJS) active electronic countermeasures pod with noise and imitative jamming transmitters, replaced by AN/ALQ-249 Next Generation Jammer	EA-6B Prowler, EA-18G Growler, EF-111A Raven	Cutler-Hammer, L3Harris
AN/ALQ-100	Internally mounted active electronic countermeasure system operating in the 2–8 GHz (14.99–3.75 cm) range, replaced by AN/ALQ-126	A-4 Skyhawk, A-6 Intruder, A-7 Corsair II, EA-6B Prowler, F-14 Tomcat RA-5C Vigilante	Sanders Associates
AN/ALQ-101	Electronic countermeasure pod operating in the 2–20 GHz (14.99–1.50 cm) range, forerunner of AN/ALQ-126, replaced by AN/ALQ-119	F-4G Wild Weasel V	Westinghouse Electronic Systems
AN/ALQ-102	C-band broadband noise jamming pod, modified AN/ALQ-98		
AN/ALQ-105	Electronic countermeasure pod operating in the 2–20 GHz (14.99–1.50 cm) range, developed from AN/ALQ-101	F-105 Thunderchief	
AN/ALQ-107	Internally mounted Infrared countermeasure system	UH-1 Iroquois	
AN/ALQ-108	Electronic countermeasure Identification Friend or Foe (IFF) jamming system	E-2C Hawkeye, F-4 Phantom II, EP-3E Aries, S-3A Viking	Magnavox
AN/ALQ-117	Pave Mint electronic countermeasure system operating in the 8–10 GHz (3.75–3.00 cm) range	B-52 Stratofortress	ITT
AN/ALQ-119	630 lb (290 kg) active electronic countermeasure noise/deception jamming pod operating in the 2–10 GHz (14.99–3.00 cm) range in three bands, forerunner of AN/ALQ-184, replaced AN/ALQ-87 and AN/ALQ-101	A-10 Thunderbolt II, EF-4C Wild Weasel IV, F-4G Wild Weasel V, F-16 Fighting Falcon	Westinghouse Electronic Systems
AN/ALQ-122	False-target electronic countermeasure radar jamming and deception system	B-52G/H Stratofortress, E-3A Sentry	Motorola, Northrop Grumman
AN/ALQ-123	Infrared countermeasure pod	A-4 Skyhawk, A-6 Intruder, A-7 Corsair II, F-4 Phantom II	Lockheed Martin
AN/ALQ-126	190 lb (86 kg) pod or internally-mounted electronic countermeasure pulsed trackbreaker operating in the 2–18 GHz (14.99–1.67 cm) range at up to 1 kW power per band, improved AN/ALQ-101, replaced AN/ALQ-100	A-6 Intruder, A-7 Corsair II, AV-8B Harrier II Plus, EA-6A Intruder, EA-6B Prowler, F-4J Phantom II, F/A-18C/D Hornet, F/A-18E/F Super Hornet, RF-4B Phantom II	Sanders Associates
AN/ALQ-128	Multimode Electronic Warfare Warning Set (EWWS), part of Tactical Electronic Warfare Systems (TEWS)	F-15C Eagle, F-15E Strike Eagle	Raytheon
AN/ALQ-129	Internally mounted trackbreaker advanced jammer, forerunner of AN/ALQ-136	F-4 Phantom II, F-14 Tomcat, A-7 Corsair II	ITT
AN/ALQ-130	Electronic countermeasure system to disrupt air-defense communications	A-4 Skyhawk, A-6 Intruder, EA-6 Prowler, A-7 Corsair II, F-4 Phantom II, F-4G Wild Weasel V	Cutler-Hammer
AN/ALQ-131	659 lb (299 kg) modular electronic countermeasure noise and repeater jamming pod operating from 2–20 GHz (14.99–1.50 cm) using 17 possible configurations covering 3 bands, developed from AN/ALQ-119	A-7 Corsair II, A-10C Thunderbolt II, AC-130 Spectre, C-130 Hercules, F-111 Aardvark, F-4 Phantom II, F-4G Wild Weasel V, F-15 Eagle, F-16 Fighting Falcon, RF-4 Phantom II	BAE, Northrop Grumman
AN/ALQ-132	Hot Brick Electro-optical (EO) and infrared countermeasure system, forerunner of AN/ALQ-140	A-4 Skyhawk, A-6 Intruder, A-7 Corsair II, A-10 Thunderbolt II, OV-10 Bronco	Sanders Associates, BAE
AN/ALQ-133	Quick Look II 1,000 lb (450 kg) electronic signals intelligence (ELINT) surveillance pod operating in the .4–18 GHz (74.95–1.67 cm) frequency range with a UHF data link range of up to 140 nmi (160 mi; 260 km)	A-10 Thunderbolt II, OV-1 Mohawk, RC-12K Guardrail, RV-1D Mohawk	Electronics & Space Corp, United Technology Laboratories
AN/ALQ-135	300 lb (140 kg) internally-mounted automatic combined pulse and Continuous Wave (CW) electronic countermeasure system with 360º coverage operating from 2–20 GHz (14.99–1.50 cm), a part of Tactical Electronic Warfare System (TEWS), replaced by AN/ALQ-250	F-15C Eagle, F-15E Strike Eagle	Northrop Grumman
AN/ALQ-136	80 lb (36 kg) microprocessor-controlled fully automatic electronic countermeasure repeater jamming system operating in the 8–16 GHz (3.75–1.87 cm) range, based on AN/ALQ-129, interfaces with AN/APR-39, replaced by AN/ALQ-211	AH-1J SeaCobra, AH-1S Cobra, AH-64A Apache, AH-64D Apache, EH-60A Black Hawk, OV-1D Mohawk, MH-47E Chinook, MH-60K Black Hawk, RC-12N/P Guardrail	ITT; Northrop Grumman
AN/ALQ-137	1 kW combined pulse and Continuous Wave (CW) imitative jammer operating from 2–15 GHz (14.99–2.00 cm), used with AN/ALR-62, replaced AN/ALQ-94	F/EF-111A/E/F Aardvark	Sanders Associates
AN/ALQ-140	Internally mounted infrared countermeasure system, developed from AN/ALQ-132	F-4 Phantom II, F-4G Wild Weasel V	Sanders Associates
AN/ALQ-142	143 lb (65 kg) Electronic Support Measures (ESM) and Signals Intelligence (SIGINT) system with 360º coverage operating from 2–25 GHz (14.99–1.20 cm), part of Light Airborne Multi-Purpose System (LAMPS III) interfaces with AN/AYK-14 with data link transmitting to AN/SLQ-32	SH-60B Seahawk	Raytheon
AN/ALQ-144	1.7 kW 29 lb (13 kg) Infrared countermeasures (IRCM) system with 360º coverage, replaced by AN/ALQ-212 ATIRCM/CMWS	AH-1J SeaCobra, AH-1S Cobra, AH-1T Improved SeaCobra, AH-1W SuperCobra, AH-64 Apache, EH-1H Iroquois, EH-60A Black Hawk, MH-60G Pave Hawk, MH-60R Seahawk, MH-60S Knighthawk, OV-10D Bronco, SH-2G Super Seasprite, UH-1 Iroquois, UH-60 Black Hawk	Sanders Associates, BAE
AN/ALQ-146	Infrared countermeasure pod	CH-46 Sea Knight	Sanders Associates
AN/ALQ-147	Pylon-mounted infrared countermeasure system	OV-1D Mohawk, RV-1D Mohawk	Sanders Associates
AN/ALQ-149	400 lb (180 kg) VHF/UHF electronic countermeasure command and control communications (C^{3}) jammer operating from 20–70 MHz (14.99–4.28 m) to be used with AN/ALQ-99 and AN/AYK-14	EA-6B Prowler (ADVCAP)	Sanders Associates, Lockheed Martin
AN/ALQ-151	Quick Fix 150 watt 16,500 lb (7,500 kg) electronic countermeasure system providing HF/VHF direction finding (DF), interception (COMINT/ELINT) and jamming operating from 2–76 MHz (149.90–3.94 m), includes AN/TLQ-17	EH-1H Iroquois, EH-1X Iroquois, EH-60A Black Hawk, EH-60L Black Hawk	Marconi Aerospace, Raytheon
AN/ALQ-153	180 lb (82 kg) solid-state pulse-Doppler tail radar missile approach warning system, replaced AN/ALQ-127	B-1B Lancer, B-52 Stratofortress, F-14 Tomcat, F-15 Eagle, F-16 Fighting Falcon, F/A-18 Hornet, F-111 Aardvark	Westinghouse Electronic Systems, Northrop Grumman
AN/ALQ-155	653 lb (296 kg) Power Management System (PMS) radar jammer with 360º coverage and manual/automatic control of other jamming transmitters covering a 1–8 GHz (29.98–3.75 cm) frequency range (D/E/F/G/H-bands)	B-52 Stratofortress, MC-130E Combat Talon	Northrop Grumman
AN/ALQ-156	49.6 lb (22.5 kg) solid-state stand-alone or integrated missile approach warning system (MAWS) pulse-Doppler radar with 360º coverage, may be part of AN/ALQ-184 and AN/TPQ-37	C-23B Sherpa, C-130 Hercules, CH-47 Chinook, EH-1H Iroquois, EH-60A Black Hawk, OV-1D Mohawk, RC-12 Guardrail, RU-21 Ute, RV-1D Mohawk	BAE
AN/ALQ-157	220 lb (100 kg) 4 kW Infrared Countermeasure (IRCM) system with 360º coverage using up to 5 jamming codes, each with wide frequency agility ranges	C-130 Hercules, C-130J Super Hercules, CH-46E Sea Knight, CH-47 Chinook, CH-53 Sea Stallion, E-2C Hawkeye, MH-53 Pave Low, P-3C Orion, SH-3 Sea King	Loral Space & Communications, Lockheed Martin
AN/ALQ-161	5,200 lb (2,400 kg) 120 kW electronic countermeasure jamming and tail warning system operating from 0.2–25 GHz (149.90–1.20 cm), using an IBM AP-101F computer, and integrated with AN/ASQ-184	B-1B Lancer	Eaton Corp, L3Harris
AN/ALQ-162	Shadowbox / Shadowbox II 42.5 lb (19.3 kg) internally mounted electronic countermeasure pulse-Doppler continuous wave (CW) deception jamming system operating from 6–20 GHz (5.00–1.50 cm), may be controlled by AN/ALQ-213, and may be contained in AN/ALQ-164 pod	AV-8B Harrier II, EH-60A Black Hawk, MH-47E Chinook, MH-53J Pave Low III, MH-60G Pave Hawk, MH-60K Black Hawk, RC-12D Guardrail, RC-12K Guardrail	Northrop Grumman
AN/ALQ-164	350 lb (160 kg) active electronic countermeasure pod operating from 2–18 GHz (14.99–1.67 cm), pod system combining AN/ALQ-126 and AN/ALQ-162	AV-8B Harrier II	
AN/ALQ-165	246 lb (112 kg) internally mounted Airborne Self-Protection Jammer (ASPJ) operating in the 1–35 GHz (29.98–0.86 cm) range, replaced by AN/ALQ-214	F-14D Super Tomcat, F-16C/D Fighting Falcon, F/A-18C/D Hornet, F/A-18E/F Super Hornet	ITT
AN/ALQ-166	Countermeasures Set, helicopter-towed, remotely controlled minesweeping system		EDO Corp
AN/ALQ-167	Angry Kitten 386 lb (175 kg) active electronic countermeasure 8 kW noise/deception pod operating from 0.05–10.5 GHz (599.58–2.86 cm)	A-6E Intruder, EA-6A Intruder, EA-6B Prowler, Lockheed EP-3J, F-14A Tomcat, F-14B Tomcat, F-14D Super Tomcat, F-16 Fighting Falcon, F/A-18A/B Hornet, F/A-18C/D Hornet, Douglas EC-24A, NKC-135 Big Crow	Rodale Electronics
AN/ALQ-171	Combined pulse mode and Continuous Wave (CW) electronic countermeasure pod	F-5E/F/G Tiger	Northrop Grumman
AN/ALQ-172	1,631 lb (740 kg) internally mounted electronic countermeasure system operating from 0.1–18 GHz (299.79–1.67 cm), possibly being extended to 40 GHz (7.5 mm)	AC-130H Spectre, AC-130U Spooky II, B-52H Stratofortress, MC-130E Combat Talon, MC-130H Combat Talon II	ITT Avionics, L3Harris
AN/ALQ-176	319 lb (145 kg) advanced electronic countermeasure pod using voltage-tuned magnetron transmitters operating in the 0.8–15.5 GHz (37.47–1.93 cm) range	F-4 Phantom II, F-5 Freedom Fighter, F-5 Tiger, F-16 Fighting Falcon	Hercules Defense Electronics
AN/ALQ-178	316 lb (143 kg) internally mounted Rapid Alert Programmed Power management of Radar Targets III (RAPPORT III) integrated radar warning receiver and electronic countermeasure suite operating from 0.5–20 GHz (59.96–1.50 cm), forerunner of AN/ALQ-202	F-16 Fighting Falcon	Loral Corp, Lockheed Martin
AN/ALQ-179	Compass Hammer electro-optical laser turret anti-aircraft artillery countermeasures pod	F-4 Phantom II	
AN/ALQ-184	744 lb (337 kg) active electronic countermeasure noise and deception radar jamming pod operating from 2–10 GHz (14.99–3.00 cm) using Rotman scannable lens antennas, modified AN/ALQ-119	A-10C Thunderbolt II, F-4G Wild Weasel V, F-15 Eagle, F-16 Fighting Falcon	Raytheon
AN/ALQ-196	Integrated defensive electronic countermeasure system	AC-130U Spooky II, MC-130E Combat Talon	Sanders Associates, BAE
AN/ALQ-202	200 lb (91 kg) internally mounted autonomous radar warning receiver and electronic countermeasure jammer with digital radio frequency memory (DRFM) operating from 2–20 GHz (14.99–1.50 cm), developed from AN/ALQ-178	F-14 Tomcat, F-16 Fighting Falcon	Lockheed Martin
AN/ALQ-205	Phase-locked omni-directional Infrared (IR) Countermeasures (IRCM) system for rotary wing aircraft (helicopters)		
AN/ALQ-210	56.6 lb (25.7 kg) passive Electronic Support Measures (ESM) threat warning system with 360° coverage operating from 2–18 GHz (14.99–1.67 cm)	MH-60R Seahawk, MH-60S Knighthawk	Lockheed Martin
AN/ALQ-211	143 lb (65 kg) Suite of Integrated RF Countermeasures (SIRFC) pod, replaced AN/ALQ-136	CV-22B Osprey, MH-47 Chinook, MH-60 Jayhawk	ITT, L3Harris
AN/ALQ-212	Advanced Threat Infrared Countermeasures (ATIRCM) blinding missile threats with an active laser, comprised AN/AAR-57 replaced AN/ALQ-144	AH-64E Apache, CH-47 Chinook	BAE
AN/ALQ-213	Electronic Warfare Management Unit (EWMU)	F-16C/D Fighting Falcon	Terma A/S
AN/ALQ-214	111.2 lb (50.4 kg) internally mounted electronic countermeasures jamming signals generator operating from 1–35 GHz (29.98–0.86 cm), part of Integrated Defensive Electronic Countermeasures (IDECM) working with AN/ALE-55, replaced AN/ALQ-165	AC-130U Spooky II, F/A-18E/F Super Hornet, F/A-18E/F Super Hornet, F-15 Eagle, F-16 Fighting Falcon, MC-130H Combat Talon II	BAE, L3Harris
AN/ALQ-217	202 lb (92 kg) passive Electronic Support Measures (ESM) threat warning system with 360° coverage across 3 bands	E-2C Hawkeye, E-2D Hawkeye	Lockheed Martin
AN/ALQ-218	Electronic warfare passive radar warning receiver	EA-6B Prowler, EA-18G Growler	Northrop Grumman
AN/ALQ-221	Radar warning receiver and electronic countermeasures system	U-2 Dragon Lady	BAE
AN/ALQ-231	Intrepid Tiger II networked internally/externally mounted VHF/UHF electronic warfare communication-jamming system operating from 0.03 to 3 GHz (999 to 10 cm) (Note: As reported by Asia Military Review in January 2025, the frequency range of the latest ALQ-231 Block-X version may reach up to 40 GHz (7.5 mm))	AH-1Z Viper, AV-8B Harrier II, CH-53K King Stallion, F/A-18C/D Hornet, KC-130J tanker, MV-22B Osprey, RQ-21 Blackjack, UH-1Y Venom	Jopana Technologies
AN/ALQ-239	Digital Electronic Warfare System (DEWS)		BAE
AN/ALQ-240	Electronic Support Measures (ESM) set	P-8 Poseidon	Northrop Grumman
AN/ALQ-248	Self-contained advanced off-board electronic warfare (AOEW) active mission payload enhanced surveillance and countermeasures pod	MH-60R Seahawk, MH-60S Seahawk	Lockheed Martin
AN/ALQ-249	Next Generation Jammer mid-band (NGJ-MB) pod with active electronically scanned array (AESA) airborne electronic attack (AEA) for suppression of enemy air defenses (SEAD), replaced AN/ALQ-99	EA-18G Growler	Raytheon
AN/ALQ-250	Eagle Passive/Active Warning and Sustainment System (EPAWSS) integrated multi-spectral RF/IR electronic countermeasures and radar warning receiver, replaced AN/ALQ-135	F-15 Eagle, F-15E Strike Eagle F-15EX Eagle II	BAE
AN/ALQ-257	Internally mounted Integrated Viper Electronic Warfare Suite (IVEWS)	F-16 Fighting Falcon, ME-11B HADES	Northrop Grumman
AN/ALQ-260	BriteCloud expendable Digital Radio Frequency Memory (DRFM) battery-powered countermeasures decoy	A-10 Thunderbolt II, C-130 Hercules, F-15 Eagle, F-16 Fighting Falcon, F/A-18 Hornet, MQ-9 Reaper, MQ-9B SeaGuardian, MQ-9B SkyGuardian	Selex ES, Leonardo S.p.A.

AN/ALR – Airborne Countermeasures Receiver/Passive Detection Systems
Designation	Purpose/Description	Location/Used By	Manufacturer
AN/ALR-20	Panoramic radar receiver covering 6 bands of spectrum	B-52H Stratofortress	
AN/ALR-23	Infrared search and track (IRST) sensor, replaced by AN/AXX-1	F-14 Tomcat, F-111 Aardvark	Avco
AN/ALR-25	Radar warning receiver	F-4D Phantom II, F-14 Tomcat	Magnavox
AN/ALR-26	Radar warning receiver	F-4D Phantom II	
AN/ALR-32	360º radar sensor	RB-66 Destroyer, B-52 Stratofortress	
AN/ALR-34	Airborne Radio Direction Finder (ARDF) sensor operating in the 20–60 GHz (1.50–0.50 cm) range using Phase Angle Discrimination (PAD) for relative bearing, replaced AN/ARD-18	EC-47N/P Skytrain, EC-121 Warning Star, Boeing EC-135, Boeing RC-135	
AN/ALR-35	Airborne Radio Direction Finder (ARDF) sensor with Nortronics 1060 airborne data processor, improved AN/ALR-34	EC-47N/P Skytrain, U-21 Ute	Sanders Associates
AN/ALR-38	Airborne Radio Direction Finder (ARDF) sensor	EC-47Q Skytrain	
AN/ALR-39	RF sensor, replaced by AN/ALR-62	F-111 Aardvark, FB-111 Aardvark	
AN/ALR-40	Countermeasures receiver	EA-3B Skywarrior	GTE-Sylvania
AN/ALR-41	RF sensor, replaced by AN/ALR-62	F-111 Aardvark, FB-111 Aardvark	
AN/ALR-45	Compass Tie radar warning receiver operating in the 2–14 GHz (14.99–2.14 cm) range, replaced by AN/ALR-67	A-4F Skyhawk, A-6 Intruder, A-7E Corsair II, F-4J Phantom II, F-14 Tomcat, RA-5C Vigilante	Itek, Litton Industries
AN/ALR-46	Radar warning receiver operating in the 2–20 GHz (14.99–1.50 cm) range	AC-130 Spectre, F-4 Phantom II, RF-4C Phantom II, F-5 Tiger, B-52 Stratofortress, CC-130, Lockheed MC-130	Litton, General Instrument
AN/ALR-47	RF illumination detection sensor, replaced by AN/ALR-76	F-4F Phantom II, F-5 Tiger, S-3 Viking	
AN/ALR-50	Surface-to-air missile launch detection system operating in the 4–20 GHz (7.49–1.50 cm) range	A-4 Skyhawk, A-7 Corsair II, EA-6B Prowler, F-4N Phantom II, F-14 Tomcat, F-111 Aardvark, FB-111 Aardvark, RF-4B Phantom II	
AN/ALR-52	Multichannel radar sensor operating in the .5–18 GHz (59.96–1.67 cm) range	EP-3E Orion	
AN/ALR-56	Radar warning receiver operating in the 2–20 GHz (14.99–1.50 cm) range, part of Tactical Electronic Warfare System (TEWS), controls the AN/ALQ-135	A-7D Corsair II, B-52 Stratofortress, F-15 Eagle, F-16 Fighting Falcon, RF-4 Phantom II	Loral Corp, Litton Industries
AN/ALR-59	Automated four-band passive superheterodyne receiver radar direction finding sensor operating in the .5–18 GHz (59.96–1.67 cm) range	E-2C Hawkeye	
AN/ALR-62	Radar warning receiver system or Countermeasures Receiving Set (CRS) operating from 0.5–18 GHz (60.0–1.7 cm),, used with AN/ALQ-137 and AN/AAR-44, developed from AN/APS-109, replaced AN/ALR-39 and AN/ALR-41	F-111 Aardvark, F-111C Pig, EF-111 Raven	Dalmo-Victor, Litton Industries
AN/ALR-64	Compass Sail low band airborne UHF/L-band missile approach radar warning receiver part of AN/ALR-69	A-10 Thunderbolt II, AC-130U Spooky II, B-52H Stratofortress, F-4 Phantom II, F-16 Fighting Falcon, HH-53 Super Jolly Green Giant, Lockheed MC-130	
AN/ALR-66	60 lb (27 kg) digital computer controlled radar warning receiver electronics intelligence and measurement and signature intelligence (ELINT/MASINT) system operating from 2–20 GHz (14.99–1.50 cm) with 360º coverage, replaced AN/ALQ-78	A-4 Skyhawk, A-7 Corsair II, C-130 Hercules, E-6 Mercury, F-4 Phantom II, F-16 Fighting Falcon, P-3C Orion, SH-2F Seasprite, SH-3 Sea King	General Instrument, Northrop Grumman
AN/ALR-67	Radar warning receiver operating in the 1–16 GHz (29.98–1.87 cm) range, replaced AN/ALR-45	A-6E Intruder, AV-8B Harrier II Plus, EA-6B Prowler, F-14 Tomcat, F/A-18 Hornet, F/A-18E/F Super Hornet	Northrop Grumman, Raytheon
AN/ALR-68	Radar warning receiver operating in the 1–16 GHz (29.98–1.87 cm) range, improved AN/ALR-46	EA-6B Prowler, F-14 Tomcat, F/A-18 Hornet	Litton Industries
AN/ALR-69	Compass Tie radar warning receiver operating in the 1–16 GHz (29.98–1.87 cm) range, used with AN/ALR-64, improved AN/ALR-46	A-10 Thunderbolt II, AC-130U Spooky II, B-52H Stratofortress, C-130H Hercules, F-4 Phantom II, F-16 Fighting Falcon, HH-53 Super Jolly Green Giant, Lockheed MC-130	Raytheon
AN/ALR-73	Passive Detection System (PDS) electronic support measures (ESM) 360° automatic superheterodyne receiver direction finder operating between 0.5–18 GHz (59.96–1.67 cm) over 4 bands using 52 antennas, interaces with AN/AYK-14, upgraded AN/ALR-59, replaced by AN/ALQ-217	E-2C Hawkeye	Litton Industries, Northrop Grumman
AN/ALR-76	134.2 lb (60.9 kg) autonomous radar warning receiver multipurpose passive electronic support measures (ESM) with direction finding that covers 360° between 2–20 GHz (14.99–1.50 cm), replaced AN/ALR-47	S-3B Viking, EP-3E Aries, ES-3A Shadow	Lockheed Martin
AN/ALR-91	Less than 55 lb (25 kg) radar warning receiver operating from 0.5–18 GHz (0.600–0.017 m) with simultaneous band sampling		Litton Industries
AN/ALR-93	Radar warning and electronic support measures receiver operating from 0.5–18 GHz (0.600–0.017 m)		Litton Industries
AN/ALR-94	360° self-protection Electronic Warfare (EW) integrated 30 antenna broadband radar warning, targeting, and countermeasures system with a 250 nmi (290 mi; 460 km) range	F-22 Raptor	BAE
AN/ALR-646	Radar warning receiver operating in the 2–20 GHz (14.99–1.50 cm) range, supplements AN/ALR-66		

AN/ALT – Airborne Countermeasures Transmitter Systems
Designation	Purpose/Description	Location/Used By	Manufacturer
AN/ALT-6	Electronic countermeasure barrage noise jammer	B-47E Stratojet	
AN/ALT-13	Electronic countermeasure barrage jamming transmitter operating in the 2–8 GHz (14.99–3.75 cm) range, forerunner of AN/ALT-28 and AN/ALT-30	B-47 Stratojet, B-52 Stratofortress, B-57 Canberra, B-66 Destroyer	Hallicrafters, Raytheon
AN/ALT-15	A-band Electronic countermeasure barrage jamming transmitter	B-47 Stratojet, B-52 Stratofortress, B-57 Canberra, B-66 Destroyer	Hallicrafters
AN/ALT-16	D-band Electronic countermeasure transmitter, forerunner of AN/ALT-31	B-52H Stratofortress	Hallicrafters
AN/ALT-28	1,530 lb (690 kg) electronic countermeasure carcinotron barrage noise jammer operates from 0.3–100 GHz (99.93–0.30 cm) range, updated AN/ALT-13, depends on AN/ALQ-155	B-52G/H Stratofortress, B-66 Destroyer, EA-6B Prowler, MC-130E Combat Talon	Hallicrafters
AN/ALT-30	Electronic countermeasure barrage jamming transmitter, updated AN/ALT-13	B-52 Stratofortress	Hallicrafters
AN/ALT-31	Electronic countermeasure barrage jamming transmitter, updated AN/ALT-16	B-52 Stratofortress	Northrop Grumman
AN/ALT-32	Electronic countermeasure barrage communications jammer	B-52 Stratofortress	Hallicrafters

=== AMx – Aircraft Meteorological Systems ===
AN/AMH – Airborne Meteorological Recorder Systems
Designation	Purpose/Description	Location/Used By	Manufacturer
AN/AMH-3	Microwave refractometer	E-2C Hawkeye	

AN/AMQ – Airborne Meteorological Special/Combination Systems
Designation	Purpose/Description	Location/Used By	Manufacturer
AN/AMQ-23	Atmospheric meteorological probe (radiosonde) measuring temperature and humidity, and transmitting that data to a ground processing facility	Balloon-borne	Geotronics

=== APx – Piloted Aircraft Radar Systems ===
AN/APA – Airborne Radar Auxiliary Assembly Systems
Designation	Purpose/Description	Location/Used By	Manufacturer
AN/APA-46	Nosmo adapter assembly, used with AN/APQ-7 radar bombsight system	B-17 Flying Fortress, B-24 Liberator, B-29 Superfortress	
AN/APA-47	Nosmo adapter assembly, used with AN/APQ-7 radar bombsight system, replaced AN/APA-46	B-17 Flying Fortress, B-24 Liberator, B-29 Superfortress	
AN/APA-157	Radar indicator, used with AN/APQ-109	F-4D Phantom II	
AN/APA-165	Radar scope/indicator with air-to-ground ranging and moving cursors, used with AN/APQ-109	F-4D Phantom II, F-4E Phantom II	

AN/APD – Airborne Radar Direction Finding/Reconnaissance/Surveillance Systems
Designation	Purpose/Description	Location/Used By	Manufacturer
AN/APD-4	D/E/F-band radar direction finding system	B-47E Stratojet	Federal Telecommuncations Laboratories
AN/APD-7	Side-looking airborne radar (SLAR)	RA-5C Vigilante	Westinghouse Electronic Systems

AN/APG – Airborne Radar Fire-Control Systems
Designation	Purpose/Description	Location/Used By	Manufacturer
AN/APG-1	S-band airborne intercept radar, replaced by AN/APG-28	P-61 Black Widow	Bell Labs, Western Electric
AN/APG-2	S-band intercept and gun laying radar, replaced by AN/APG-16	P-61 Black Widow	General Electric
AN/APG-3	X-band tail Airborne Gun Laying (AGL) radar	B-29 Superfortress, B-36 Peacemaker	General Electric
AN/APG-4	L-band FM low altitude torpedo release radar Sniffer, replaced by AN/APG-6 and AN/APG-17	TBM Avenger	
AN/APG-5	S-band lightweight airborne range-only (ARO) radar, replaced by AN/APG-18	B-17 Flying Fortress, B-24 Liberator, F-86 Sabre	Galvin Manufacturing Corp
AN/APG-6	L-band low altitude bomb release radar Super Sniffer, replaced AN/APG-4, replaced by AN/APG-9 and AN/APG-20		
AN/APG-7	Glide bomb control radar SRB (Seeking Radar Bomb)	F-86D Sabre	
AN/APG-8	S-band tail airborne gun sight (AGS) radar, replaced by AN/APG-19	B-24 Liberator, B-29 Superfortress	General Electric
AN/APG-9	L-band low altitude bomb release radar, replaced AN/APG-6		
AN/APG-13	Falcon S-band airborne range-only (ARO) radar	B-25 Mitchell	General Electric
AN/APG-14	S-band airborne range-only (ARO) radar	B-29 Superfortress	
AN/APG-15	S-band tail airborne gun sight (AGS) radar for Project Wasp	B-29 Superfortress	General Electric
AN/APG-16	X-band gun laying radar, replaced AN/APG-2	B-32 Dominator, XB-48	Sperry Corp
AN/APG-17	S-band low altitude bomb release radar, replaced AN/APG-4		
AN/APG-18	X-band turret control radar, replaced AN/APG-5, replaced by AN/APG-19		Glenn L. Martin Company
AN/APG-19	X-band gun laying radar, replaced AN/APG-8 and AN/APG-18		Glenn L. Martin Company
AN/APG-20	S-band low altitude bomb release radar, replaced AN/APG-6		
AN/APG-21	Pterodactyl automatic air-to-ground range only radar		
AN/APG-22	X-band gun sight radar, used with Mk18/23 Lead-computing gunsights		Raytheon
AN/APG-23	Airborne gun directing radar	B-36 Peacemaker, B-50 Superfortress, PBJ-1H Mitchell	
AN/APG-24	Airborne gun directing radar	B-36 Peacemaker, B-50 Superfortress	
AN/APG-25	X-band tail gun tracking monopulse radar	F-100 Super Sabre	General Electric
AN/APG-26	I-band airborne gun aim radar	F3D Skyknight	Westinghouse Electronic Systems
AN/APG-28	Airborne range-only (ARO) intercept radar, replaced AN/APG-1	F-82 Twin Mustang	
AN/APG-29	Night/all-weather fire-control radar, replaced by AN/APG-37		
AN/APG-30	65 lb (29 kg) 5 kW X-band fire-control radar operating from 9.335–9.415 GHz (3.21–3.18 cm) with a range of 3,000 yd (2,700 m),	B-45 Tornado, B-57 Canberra, F-4E Phantom II, F-8 Crusader, F-9 Cougar, F-11 Tiger, F-84 Thunderjet, F-84F Thunderstreak, F-86 Sabre, F-100 Super Sabre, FJ-2 Fury, F2H Banshee	Sperry Corp
AN/APG-31	Ranging radar	B-57 Canberra, F-105 Thunderchief	Raytheon
AN/APG-32	X-band tail turret autotrack radar, replaced by AN/APG-41	B-36 Peacemaker, B-47E Stratojet	General Electric
AN/APG-33	X-band fire-control radar	TB-25K Mitchell, F-94 Starfire, F-89 Scorpion	General Electric, Hughes Aircraft
AN/APG-34	Airborne range only computing radar gunsight	F-104 Starfighter	General Electric
AN/APG-36	Fire control radar, replaced by AN/APG-37	F2H Banshee, F-86D/L Sabre	Hughes Aircraft
AN/APG-37	Fire control radar, replaced AN/APG-29, and AN/APG-35	F-86 Sabre, F2H Banshee	Hughes Aircraft
AN/APG-39	Airborne range only gun laying radar	B-47E Stratojet	Stavid Engineering
AN/APG-40	Fire control radar	F-94C Starfire, F-89 Scorpion, TB-25M Mitchell	Hughes Aircraft
AN/APG-41	Tail gun radar (twin radomes), replaced AN/APG-32	B-36 Peacemaker, B-52 Stratofortress	General Electric
AN/APG-43	FM continuous wave (CW) interception automatic tracking radar		Raytheon
AN/APG-45	Airborne range only fire-control radar, miniaturized AN/APG-30		General Electric
AN/APG-46	Monopulse dual-beam fire-control radar, replaced by AN/APQ-127	A-6A Intruder	
AN/APG-51	Intercept radar	F3D Skyknight, F2H Banshee, F3H Demon	Hughes Aircraft
AN/APG-56	High resolution side-looking radar	RB-57D Canberra	
AN/APG-59	Fire control radar, paired with AN/AWG-10 Fire control system, replaced AN/APQ-72, replaced by AN/APG-60	F-4J Phantom II	Westinghouse Electronic Systems
AN/APG-60	Modified AN/APQ-100 fire control radar, paired with AN/AWG-11 fire control system, replaced AN/APG-59, replaced by AN/APG-61	F-4 Phantom II	Ferranti
AN/APG-61	Fire control radar, paired with AN/AWG-12 fire control system, modified AN/APQ-109, replaced AN/APG-60	F-4 Phantom II	Ferranti
AN/APG-63	486 lb (220 kg) all-weather multimode pulse-Doppler active electronically scanned array (AESA) fire control radar with look-down/shoot-down capability operating from 8–20 GHz (3.75–1.50 cm) selectable frequencies with a range of 100 nmi (120 mi; 190 km), paired with AN/AWG-20 fire control system, forerunner of AN/APG-70	F-15 Eagle	Raytheon
AN/APG-65	560 lb (250 kg) all-weather multimode X-band Doppler fire control radar with look-down/shoot-down capability operating from 8–12 GHz (3.75–2.50 cm) at a range greater than 60 nmi (69 mi; 110 km)	AV-8B Harrier II Plus, F/A-18C/D Hornet	Raytheon
AN/APG-66	X-band solid-state medium range (up to 81 nmi; 93 mi (150 km)) multimode pulse-Doppler planar array fire control radar, forerunner of AN/APQ-164	F-16 Fighting Falcon, HU-25C Guardian	Westinghouse Electronic Systems, Northrop Grumman
AN/APG-67	160 lb (73 kg) multi-mode all-digital X-band coherent pulse-Doppler radar for air-to-air, air-to-ground, sea-search and mapping with an air-to-air range of 40 nmi (46 mi; 74 km)	F-20 Tigershark, F-16 Fighting Falcon	General Electric
AN/APG-68	Long range (maximum detection range 50 mi (80 km)) pulse-Doppler radar, variant of the AN/APG-66, replaced by AN/APG-83	F-16 Fighting Falcon	Westinghouse Electronic Systems
AN/APG-69	Air-to-air and air-to-ground X-band coherent pulse-Doppler radar, successor of AN/APQ-159	F-5E/F/G Tiger	Emerson Electric
AN/APG-70	553 lb (251 kg) all-weather multimode Doppler Beam Sharpening (DBS)/Mapping/Synthetic Aperture (SAR) fire control radar operating between 8–20 GHz (3.75–1.50 cm) selectable frequencies with an air-to-air range of 100 nmi (120 mi; 190 km), developed from AN/APG-63	F-15C/D Eagle, F-15E Strike Eagle	Raytheon
AN/APG-71	Multi-mode X-band pulse-Doppler radar system, upgrade of AN/AWG-9	F-14D Super Tomcat	Hughes Aircraft
AN/APG-73	500 lb (230 kg) all-weather multimode X-band pulse-Doppler fire control radar operating from 8–12 GHz (3.75–2.50 cm) at a range of over 60 nmi (69 mi; 110 km), developed from AN/APG-65, replaced by AN/APG-79	EA-18G Growler, F/A-18C/D Hornet, F/A-18E/F Super Hornet	Raytheon
AN/APG-76	12 kW pulse-doppler K_{u}-band multi-mode moving target indicator (MTI) synthetic-aperture radar (SAR) with a range of 100 nmi (120 mi; 190 km)	F-4E Phantom II, F-16 Fighting Falcon, S-3 Gray Wolf Viking	Norden Systems, Northrop Grumman
AN/APG-77	10 watt multifunction solid-state X-band Active Electronically Scanned Array (AESA) low-probability-of-intercept fire control radar with powerful electronic countermeasures (ECM) capabilities operating from 8–12 GHz (3.75–2.50 cm), developed from AN/APG-66/68/80 family of radars	F-22 Raptor	Northrop Grumman
AN/APG-78	Longbow millimeter-wave K_{u}-band fire-Control Radar (FCR) for AGM-114L Hellfire LongBow missiles	AH-1Z Viper, AH-64D Apache Longbow, AH-64E Guardian	Longbow LLC; (Lockheed Martin/Northrop Grumman)
AN/APG-79	X-band Active Electronically Scanned Array (AESA) radar with gallium nitride (GaN) transmit/receive modules and a 93 mi (150 km) range, replaced AN/APG-73, forerunner of AN/APQ-188	EA-18G Growler, F/A-18E/F Super Hornet	Raytheon
AN/APG-80	Air-to-air, search-and-track, air-to-ground targeting and terrain-following scalable agile beam radar	F-16E/F Fighting Falcon	Northrop Grumman
AN/APG-81	Joint Strike Fighter (JSF) Active Electronically Scanned Array (AESA) radar, successor to AN/APG-77	F-35 Lightning II	Northrop Grumman
AN/APG-82	Active Electronically Scanned Array (AESA) radar of the AN/APG-63 radar family, upgrade of AN/APG-70, forerunner of AN/APQ-188	F-15E Strike Eagle, F-15EX Eagle II	Raytheon
AN/APG-83	Active Electronically Scanned Array (AESA) fire control Scalable Agile Beam Radar (SABR), variant of the AN/APG-66, replaced AN/APG-68	F-16 Fighting Falcon	Northrop Grumman
AN/APG-85	Active Electronically Scanned Array (AESA) radar, developed from AN/APG-81	F-35 Lightning II	Northrop Grumman

AN/APN – Airborne Radar Navigation Systems
Designation	Purpose/Description	Location/Used By	Manufacturer
AN/APN-1	22.15 lb (10.05 kg) 1 watt UHF Frequency-Modulated Continuous Wave (FMCW) radar altimeter operating from 420–460 MHz (71–65 cm) at altitudes up to 4,000 ft (1,200 m)	AD-5 Skyraider, AF-2W Guardian, B-32 Dominator, C-119 Flying Boxcar, C-121 Constellation, F2H Banshee, F3D Skyknight, F6F Hellcat, F9F Panther, H-19 Chickasaw, P2V Neptune, P5M Marlin, P-61 Black Widow, PB4Y-2 Privateer, PBM-5S Mariner, PBY-6A Catalina, R5C-1 Commando, R5D Skymaster, R6D-1, SB2C-5 Helldiver, TBM-3 Avenger, XF10F Jaguar	Admiral Corp, RCA Corp
AN/APN-2	Rebecca Mk IIA airborne radar interrogator/responder also known as SCR-729		
AN/APN-3	Airborne precision Short Range Navigation (SHORAN) bombing radar	B-45 Tornado	
AN/APN-4	25.45 lb (11.54 kg) Long Range Navigation (LORAN) radar navigation receiver operating between 1.6–3.3 MHz (187–91 m) or 7.58–11.75 MHz (39.6–25.5 m), used with AN/CPN-11 and AN/CPN-12	US Navy	General Electric
AN/APN-7	Airborne transponder beacon		
AN/APN-9	Long Range Navigation (LORAN) simplified, used with AN/CPN-11 and AN/CPN-12	B-32-25-CF Dominator	
AN/APN-10	Glider interrogator/responder		
AN/APN-12	Beacon interrogator/responder	B-47E Stratojet	
AN/APN-19	Airborne beacon		
AN/APN-22	33 lb (15 kg) 1 watt FM radar altimeter operating between 4.2–4.4 GHz (7.14–6.81 cm) up to an altitude of 10,000 ft (3,000 m) over land and 20,000 ft (6,100 m) over water	A-3 Skywarrior, AD-5/6/7 Skyraider, B-66 Destroyer, C-118 Liftmaster, C-119 Flying Boxcar, C-130 Hercules, F5D Skylancer, OV-1 Mohawk, P2V-5 Neptune, RC-121 Warning Star, RF-101C Voodoo, S-2 Tracker	Electronic Assistance Corp, Sylvania Electric Products
AN/APN-42	36.56 lb (16.58 kg) 2 kW radar altimeter with range computer operating at 4.225 GHz (7.10 cm) at altitudes up to 70,000 ft (21,000 m)	WB-47E Stratojet	Sperry Gyroscope
AN/APN-59	185 lb (84 kg) 70 kW X-band solid state navigation, search and weather radar operating from 9.335–9.415 GHz (3.21–3.18 cm) with a range of 240 nmi (280 mi; 440 km), replaced AN/APS-38, replaced by AN/APN-242	AC-130H Spectre, B-57 Canberra, C-130 Hercules, C-133 Cargomaster, C-135 Stratolifter, C-141 Starlifter, HH-53 Super Jolly Green Giant, KC-97 Stratofreighter, RB-57D Canberra	Sperry Corp
AN/APN-63	11.68 lb (5.30 kg) radar beacon receiving in S-band between 2.7–2.9 GHz (11.10–10.34 cm) and transmitting in L-band at 968 MHz (0.310 m) with a range of 20 mi (32 km)	US Navy	Melpar
AN/APN-70	Long Range Navigation (LORAN) radio system	P-3A/B Orion	
AN/APN-81	35 watt X-band pulse-Doppler drift angle and velocity sensor operating from 8.7–8.9 GHz (3.45–3.37 cm) up to 70,000 ft (21,000 m), forerunner of AN/APN-102	B-47 Stratojet	General Precision
AN/APN-82	35 watt X-band pulse-Doppler navigation radar, identical to AN/APN-81 except for the addition of computer AN/ASN-6	US Air Force	General Precision, Ford Instrument Co
AN/APN-89	275.24 lb (124.85 kg) pulse-Doppler drift angle and velocity sensor operating from 8.7–8.9 GHz (3.45–3.37 cm) up to 430 mi (700 km) and 70,000 ft (21,000 m), part of AN/ASB-4 or AN/ASQ-38 bombing-navigation systems	B-52 Stratofortress	General Precision
AN/APN-97	pulse-Doppler navigation radar operating at 13.5 GHz (2.22 cm) up to 15,000 ft (4,600 m)	US Navy	Ryan Aeronautical
AN/APN-99	35 watt navigation radar drift angle and velocity sensor operating at 8.7–8.9 GHz (3.45–3.37 cm) up to 70,000 ft (21,000 m) and speeds up to 2,000 kn (3,700 km/h; 2,300 mph), uses AN/ASN-7 transistorized computer	US Air Force	General Precision, Ford Instrument Co
AN/APN-100	Radar altimeter for operation below 3,000 ft (910 m) at speeds less than 450 kn (830 km/h; 520 mph) operating at 4.2–4.4 GHz (7.14–6.81 cm)	US Navy	Emerson Research Laboratories
AN/APN-102	96 lb (44 kg) 10 watt X-band pulse-Doppler drift angle and velocity sensor operating between 8.77–8.83 GHz (3.42–3.40 cm) at up to 70,000 ft (21,000 m) and speeds up to 939 kn (1,739 km/h; 1,081 mph), smaller version of AN/APN-81	RB-47 Stratojet, WB-47E Stratojet	General Precision
AN/APN-105	217 lb (98 kg) 3 watt pulse-Doppler navigation radar velocity sensor operating at 9.8 GHz (3.06 cm) up to 70,000 ft (21,000 m)	US Air Force	Laboratory for Electronics
AN/APN-113	K_{u}-band pulse-Doppler drift angle and velocity sensor with a range of 12 mi (20 km), part of AN/ASQ-42	B-58 Hustler	Raytheon
AN/APN-122	Doppler navigation radar, replaced by AN/APN-169	A-6A Intruder	
AN/APN-131	3 watt X-band pulse-Doppler klystron powered navigation radar operating from 9.79–9.81 GHz (3.06–3.06 cm) with a range of 12 nmi (14 mi; 22 km)	F-105 Thunderchief, T-39 Sabreliner, TF-8 Crusader	Laboratory for Electronics
AN/APN-133	125 watt L-band high altitude radar altimeter operating from 1.635–1.645 GHz (18.34–18.22 cm) up to 70,000 ft (21,000 m), modified SCR-728	C-130 Hercules, C-135 Stratolifter	
AN/APN-141	Radar altimeter, replaced by AN/APN-194	A-4 Skyhawk, A-6A Intruder, P-3A/B Orion	Bendix Corp
AN/APN-149	Terrain-following radar	Did not enter service	Texas Instruments
AN/APN-153	K_{u}-band pulse-Doppler navigation radar, replaced by AN/APN-185	A-4 Skyhawk, A-6B Intruder, A-7A Corsair II, EA-6B Prowler, P-3A/B Orion	General Instrument
AN/APN-155	0.8 watt L-band Frequency-Modulated Continuous Wave (FMCW) radar altimeter operating from 1.615–1.645 GHz (18.56–18.22 cm) up to 3,300 ft (1 km)	F-4 Phantom II	Stewart-Warner
AN/APN-159	1 kW long range L-band radar altimeter operating from 1.6–1.66 GHz (18.74–18.06 cm) up to 98,000 ft (30 km)	RF-4 Phantom II	Stewart-Warner
AN/APN-165	Terrain-following radar	OV-1 Mohawk	Texas Instruments
AN/APN-169	130 lb (59 kg) 1 kW station-keeping radar controlling up to 36 aircraft to a 10-second 4,000 ft (1,200 m) separation, interfaces with AN/APN-241 and AN/TPN-27 zone marker, forerunner of AN/APN-243, replaced AN/APN-59, AN/APN-122, AN/APQ-170 and AN/APQ-175	C-17 Globemaster III, C-130E/H/J Hercules, C-141B Starlifter	Leonardo DRS
AN/APN-171	59.9 lb (27.2 kg) 10 kW upper J-band monopulse terrain avoidance/terrain-following radar and altimeter with a terrian clearance of 200–1,000 ft (61–305 m), replaced by AN/APN-194	AC-130 Spectre, AH-1 Cobra, C-130 Hercules, CH-46 Sea Knight, CH-53 Sea Stallion, E-2C Hawkeye, EH-1H Iroquois, HH-1 Huey, HH-2C/D Seasprite, HH-3E Jolly Green Giant, HH-46 Sea Knight, HH-53 Super Jolly Green Giant, Lockheed EC-130, Lockheed HC-130, Lockheed LC-130, Lockheed MC-130, OV-10 Bronco, RH-53D Sea Stallion, RV-1D Mohawk, S-3 Viking, SH-2 Seasprite, SH-3 Sea King, UH-1 Iroquois, UH-3H Sea King, UH-46 Sea Knight, VH-3 Sea King	Honeywell
AN/APN-182	K_{u}-band navigation radar	SH-2F Seasprite, SH-3 Sea King, UH-3H Sea King	Teledyne Ryan
AN/APN-185	Pulse-Doppler navigation radar, replaced AN/APN-153, replaced by AN/APN-190	A-7D Corsair II	Singer Corp
AN/APN-190	Doppler groundspeed and drift detector navigation radar, replaced AN/APN-185	A-7E Corsair II, AC-130E Spectre, F-111 Aardvark	Singer Corp
AN/APN-194	4.4 lb (2.0 kg) 5 watt solid state radar altimeter operating at 4.3 GHz (6.97 cm) at altitudes from 0–5,000 ft (0–1,524 m), replaced AN/APN-171, replaced AN/APN-141	A-4 Skyhawk, A-7E Corsair II, EA-6B Prowler, F-14 Tomcat, F/A-18 Hornet, Harpoon missile, P-3C Orion	Honeywell
AN/APN-209	4.2 lb (1.9 kg) 5 watt radar altimeter operating at 4.3 GHz (6.97 cm) at altitudes from 0–1,500 ft (0–457 m) compatible with night vision goggles	AH-1 Cobra, CH-47 Chinook, OH-58C Kiowa, UH-1H Iroquois	Honeywell Aerospace
AN/APN-215	Multimode X-band sea search terrain-mapping weather radar, identical to AN/APN-234	RU-38A Twin Condor	AlliedSignal
AN/APN-217	28 lb (13 kg) Navstar GPS equipped solid state microprocessor-controlled CW Doppler navigation/velocity sensor operating at 13.25 GHz (2.26 cm) measuring speeds up to 400 kn (740 km/h; 460 mph) and altitude up to 15,000 ft (4,600 m)	AH-1W Cobra, CH-46 Sea Knight, CH-53E Super Stallion, HH-3F Pelican, HH-60H Rescue Hawk, MH-53E Sea Dragon, MH-60 Jayhawk, RH-53D Sea Stallion, SH-3D Sea King, SH-60B/F Seahawk, Sikorsky S-70, UH-1N Twin Huey, VH-60N White Hawk	Teledyne, Northrop Grumman
AN/APN-218	82.1 lb (37.2 kg) 1.5 watt Doppler navigation/velocity sensor operating at 13.3 GHz (2.25 cm) measuring speeds up to 1,800 kn (3,300 km/h; 2,100 mph) and altitude up to 70,000 ft (21,000 m)	AC-130H Spectre, B-52H Stratofortress, C-130 Hercules, KC-135 Stratotanker, MC-130E Combat Talon, MC-130H Combat Talon II	Teledyne Ryan
AN/APN-232	Combined altitude radar altimeter (CARA) operating up to 50,000 feet (15,000 m)	C-5 Galaxy, C-17 Globemaster III, C-130T Hercules, C-141B Starlifter, F-15 Eagle, F-16 Fighting Falcon, Sikorsky H-53, and many others	Extant Aerospace
AN/APN-234	Multimode X-band sea search terrain-mapping color weather radar, identical to AN/APN-215	C-2A Greyhound	AlliedSignal
AN/APN-237	K_{u}-band terrain-following radar, part of AN/AAQ-13		Texas Instruments
AN/APN-239	Lightweight weather/ground-mapping radar		Bendix/King
AN/APN-241	X-band high-resolution Low Power Color Radar (LCPR) for weather and navigation radar including terrain-following/terrain avoidance capability with a range of 20 nmi (23 mi; 37 km)	AC-130H Spectre, C-130 Hercules, MC-130W Combat Spear	Westinghouse Electronic Systems, Northrop Grumman
AN/APN-242	192 lb (87 kg) 25 kW 360º X-band color and weather and navigation radar operating at 9.365–9.385 GHz (3.20–3.19 cm), replaced AN/APN-59	Boeing RC-135, C-130 Hercules	Northrop Grumman
AN/APN-243	25 watt station-keeping radar with wideband network capability controlling up to 100 aircraft to a 10-second 4,000 ft (1,200 m) separation at a range of up to 100 nmi (120 mi; 190 km), interfaces with AN/APN-241 and AN/TPN-27 zone marker, upgraded AN/APN-169	C-17 Globemaster III, C-130E/H/J Hercules, C-141B Starlifter	Leonardo DRS

AN/APQ – Airborne Radar Special/Combination Systems
Designation	Purpose/Description	Location/Used By	Manufacturer
AN/APQ-5	125 lb (57 kg) low altitude up to 4,000 ft (1,200 m) marine radar bombing equipment, attaches to radar sets	B-32-1-CF Dominator	
AN/APQ-7	Eagle X-band radar bombsight system, used with AN/APA-46 and AN/APA-47	B-17 Flying Fortress, B-24 Liberator, B-29 Superfortress	Western Electric
AN/APQ-13	Mickey set X-band bombing radar, also known as H2X, developed from the British H2S radar, later used as a ground-based weather radar	B-17 Flying Fortress, B-24 Liberator, B-29 Superfortress, B-32-1-CF Dominator, National Weather Service	Bell Labs, Western Electric
AN/APQ-35	X-band night intruder radar	F3D Skyknight	Westinghouse Electronic Systems
AN/APQ-36	Fire control radar	F3D Skyknight, F7U Cutlass	Westinghouse Electronic Systems
AN/APQ-41	X-band fire control radar operating from 9.05–9.4 GHz (3.31–3.19 cm) with a range of 175 nmi (201 mi; 324 km), developed from AN/APQ-36	F2H Banshee	Westinghouse Electronic Systems
AN/APQ-50	180 kW X-band fire control radar, replaced by AN/APQ-72	F4D Skyray, F-4J Phantom II, XF4H-1 Phantom II, YF4H-1 Phantom II	Westinghouse Electronic Systems
AN/APQ-72	X-band fire control radar with a range of 200 nmi (230 mi; 370 km), replaced AN/APQ-50, replaced by AN/APG-59 and AN/APQ-100	F-4B Phantom II, F4D Skyray	Westinghouse Electronic Systems
AN/APQ-89	Terrain-following radar	T-2 Buckeye	Texas Instruments
AN/APQ-92	Search and terrain avoidance radar	A-6A Intruder	Norden Systems
AN/APQ-99	Forward looking radar	A-7A Corsair II, RF-4B/C Phantom II	Texas Instruments
AN/APQ-100	Fire control radar with a range of 40 nmi (46 mi; 74 km), replaced AN/APQ-72	F-4C Phantom II, RF-101 Voodoo	Westinghouse Electronic Systems
AN/APQ-101	Terrain-following radar		Texas Instruments
AN/APQ-102	X-band synthetic-aperture radar (SAR) terrain-following radar with 33 ft (10 m) resolution, replaced by AN/APQ-110	RF-4B Phantom II, RF-4C Phantom II	Goodyear Aerospace
AN/APQ-103	Search radar terrain clearance (SRTC)	A-6B Intruder	Norden Systems, Northrop Grumman
AN/APQ-109	Solid-state fire control radar, used with AN/APA-165, improved AN/APQ-100, forerunner of AN/APQ-117	F-4D Phantom II, F4D Skyray	Westinghouse Electronic Systems
AN/APQ-110	K_{u}-band terrain-following radar, replaced AN/APQ-102, forerunner of AN/APQ-128 and AN/APQ-134	F-111 Aardvark, RF-4C Phantom II	Texas Instruments
AN/APQ-112	Target tracking and ranging radar	A-6C Intruder	Norden Systems, Northrop Grumman
AN/APQ-113	K_{u}-band multi-mode air-to-ground and air-to-air nose attack radar	F-111 Aardvark	General Electric
AN/APQ-114	K_{u}-band multi-mode nose radar, variant of the AN/APQ-113	F-4 Phantom II, FB-111A Aardvark	General Electric
AN/APQ-115	K_{u}-band terrain-following radar	A-7A Corsair II, C-130E Hercules, F-111 Aardvark, RF-4C Phantom II	Texas Instruments
AN/APQ-116	Terrain-following radar	A-7B Corsair II, C-130 Hercules	Texas Instruments
AN/APQ-117	Terrain following and attack radar, developed from AN/APQ-109	F-4E Phantom II	Westinghouse Electronic Systems
AN/APQ-120	X-band solid-state fire-control radar, developed from AN/APQ-117	F-4E Phantom II, F-4G Wild Weasel V	Westinghouse Electronic Systems
AN/APQ-122	Dual frequency X/K-band long range terrain-following navigation radar with a range of 240 nmi (280 mi; 440 km) operating from 8–10 GHz (3.75–3.00 cm) for long range and 20–40 GHz (1.50–0.75 cm) short range, replaced by AN/APQ-175	C-130 Hercules, Boeing RC-135, E-4B NEACP, MC-130E Combat Talon, MC-130H Combat Talon II, RC-135C Big Team, T-43 Gator	Texas Instruments
AN/APQ-126	K_{u}-band ground mapping, air-to-ground ranging terrain-following radar	A-7D Corsair II, A-7E Corsair II, MH-53J Pave Low III	Texas Instruments
AN/APQ-128	30 kW K_{u}-band frequency agile multimode terrain-following radar operating between 16.7–17 GHz (1.80–1.76 cm) out to a range of 10 nmi (12 mi; 19 km), upgrade of AN/APQ-110, forerunner of AN/APQ-171	A-7E Corsair II	Sperry Corp
AN/APQ-129	Pulse Doppler K_{u}-band multi-mode radar, replaced by AN/APS-130	EA-6B Prowler	Northrop Grumman
AN/APQ-134	30 kW K_{u}-band terrain-following radar operating from 16.7–17 GHz (1.80–1.76 cm) with a range of 10 nmi (12 mi; 19 km), upgrade of AN/APQ-110	F-111 Aardvark, FB-111A Aardvark	Texas Instruments
AN/APQ-137	Moving Target Indicator (MTI) radar pod	AH-1G HueyCobra	Emerson Electric
AN/APQ-139	K_{u}-band multi-mode radar	B-57G Canberra	Texas Instruments
AN/APQ-140	K_{u}-band multifunction radar	B-1A Lancer	Raytheon
AN/APQ-141	terrain-following/terrain avoidance radar, forerunner of AN/APQ-154	Sikorsky HH-53	Norden Systems
AN/APQ-146	Forward looking multi-mode radar	F-111F Aardvark	Texas Instruments
AN/APQ-147	Terrain-following radar	MH-60K Black Hawk	Texas Instruments
AN/APQ-148	Solid-state multi-mode radar	A-6E Intruder	Norden Systems
AN/APQ-150	12 kW X-band short range Beacon Tracking Radar (BTR) operating between 9.373–9.377 GHz (0.03198–0.03197 m) with a range of 40 nmi (46 mi; 74 km)	AC-130A/E/H Spectre	Motorola
AN/APQ-153	X-band fire-control radar for search, air-to-air gunnery and missiles	F-5E Tiger II	Emerson Electric
AN/APQ-154	Terrain-following radar, improved AN/APQ-141	HH-53 Super Jolly Green Giant	Texas Instruments
AN/APQ-156	J-band multi-mode radar, used with AN/AAS-33, variant of AN/APQ-148, forerunner of AN/APS-130	A-6E Intruder	Norden Systems
AN/APQ-157	Fire-control radar operating from 8–10 GHz (3.7–3.0 cm)	F-5F Tiger II	Emerson Electric
AN/APQ-158	Pave Low III K_{u}-band multimode terrain-following radar, modified AN/APQ-126	MH-53J Pave Low III	Texas Instruments
AN/APQ-159	X/K_{u}-band forward-looking air-to-air radar, replaced by AN/APG-69	F-5E Tiger II	Emerson Electric, US Dynamics
AN/APQ-162	Terrain-following radar, developed from AN/APQ-99	RF-4C Phantom II	Texas Instruments
AN/APQ-164	1,256 lb (570 kg) X-band multimode pulse doppler synthetic-aperture navigation/weapons control/terrain-following radar with 1,526 phased array transmitting elements operating from 8–20 GHz (3.75–1.50 cm) with a range of 160 nmi (180 mi; 300 km), developed from AN/APG-66 and AN/APG-68	B-1B Lancer	Northrop Grumman
AN/APQ-166	Terrain-following radar, replaced AN/AQS-176	B-52 Stratofortress	Northrop Grumman
AN/APQ-168	K_{u}-band multimode terrain-following radar	HH-60D Nighthawk, MH-60K Black Hawk	Texas Instruments
AN/APQ-170	Dual frequency integrated X/K_{u}-band navigation and terrain-following radar operating from 8–18 GHz (3.75–1.67 cm) with a range of 50 nmi (58 mi; 93 km) or 240 nmi (280 mi; 440 km) radar beacon, forerunner of AN/APQ-425, replaced by AN/APN-169	MC-130H Combat Talon II	Emerson Electric, Lockheed Martin
AN/APQ-171	K_{u}-band dual channel frequency agile terrain-following radar operating up to 12,000 ft (3,700 m), developed from AN/APQ-128	F-111C Pig, F-111F Aardvark	Texas Instruments
AN/APQ-172	Terrain-following radar	RF-4C/E Phantom II	Texas Instruments
AN/APQ-173	Multimode synthetic-aperture radar, developed from AN/APQ-156	A-6F/G Intruder, Did not enter service	Norden Systems
AN/APQ-174	250 lb (110 kg) pod-mounted K_{u}-band terrain avoidance/terrain-following radar down to as low as 100 ft (30 m) operating from 12–18 GHz (2.50–1.67 cm), developed from AN/AAQ-13 LANTIRN terrain-following radar	CV-22 Osprey, HH-60L/M Black Hawk, MH-47E Chinook, MH-47G Chinook, MH-60 Jayhawk, MH-60K Black Hawk	Raytheon
AN/APQ-175	90 kW dual frequency X/K_{a}-band multimode weather/navigation radar operating from 8–12 GHz (3.75–2.50 cm) long range out to 240 nmi (280 mi; 440 km) and 27–40 GHz (1.11–0.75 cm) short range, replaced AN/APQ-122, replaced by AN/APN-169	MC-130E Combat Talon	Emerson Electric, Electronics and Space Corp
AN/APQ-180	All-weather multimode radar system, developed from AN/APG-70	AC-130U Spooky II	Hughes Aircraft
AN/APQ-181	1,625 lb (737 kg) K_{u}-band 21-mode GPS aided targeting low-probability-of-intercept (LPI) electronically scanned array synthetic aperture radar operating from 12.5–18 GHz (2.40–1.67 cm) with terrain-following capability down to 600 ft (180 m)	B-2 Spirit	Hughes Aircraft, Raytheon
AN/APQ-186	K_{u}-band terrain avoidance/terrain-following radar, upgraded AN/APQ-174 with a new processor and more modes	CV-22 Osprey	Raytheon
AN/APQ-187	Silent Knight 162 lb (73 kg) multimode terrain avoidance/terrain-following radar, replaced AN/APQ-170, AN/APQ-174 and AN/APQ-186	CV-22 Osprey, MH-47G Chinook, MH-60M Black Hawk, MC-130H Combat Talon II	
AN/APQ-188	X-band Active electronically scanned array (AESA) radar, developed from AN/APG-79 and AN/APG-82, replaced AN/APQ-166	B-52J Stratofortress (Note: The B-52J Radar Modernization Program (RMP) upgrade is still in development, expected in service by 2033, so the APQ-188 is planned for the B-52J)	Raytheon
AN/APQ-425	Navigation and terrain-following radar, developed from AN/APQ-170	MC-130H Combat Talon II	Systems & Electronics

AN/APR – Airborne Radar Receiver/Passive Detection Systems
Designation	Purpose/Description	Location/Used By	Manufacturer
AN/APR-2	Electronic signals intelligence (ELINT) radar receiver operating from 90–1,000 MHz (333.10–29.98 cm)		Galvin Manufacturing Corp
AN/APR-9	Electronic signals intelligence (ELINT) receiver, early warning radar operating from 1–10.75 GHz (29.98–2.79 cm)	A-1 Skyraider, B-52 Stratofortress, B-57 Canberra, EB-66 Destroyer, EC-121 Warning Star, P-2 Neptune, S-2 Tracker, AF-2W Guardian, ZPK blimp	AIL Systems, Collins Radio
AN/APR-25	S/C/X-band radar warning receiver	A-6E Intruder, A-7E Corsair II, B-52G/H Stratofortress, C-123 Provider, C-130 Hercules, EF-4C Wild Weasel IV, F-14 Tomcat, F-100 Super Sabre, F-105 Thunderchief, OV-1D Mohawk, RA-5C Vigilante, U-21 Ute	Itek
AN/APR-34	Communications intelligence (COMINT) receiver		Watkins-Johnson
AN/APR-38	Automated electronic intelligence (ELINT) radar signals receiver operating in the .6–18 GHz (49.97–1.67 cm) range	F-4G Wild Weasel V	
AN/APR-39	Radar warning receiver operating primarily in the 2–9 GHz (14.99–3.33 cm) range	AH-1F Cobra, AH-1W Cobra, AH-64A Apache, CH-46 Sea Knight, CH-47D Chinook, CH-53 Sea Stallion, EH-60A Black Hawk, KC-130 Tanker, OH-58C/D Kiowa, OV-1D Mohawk, RV-1D Mohawk, RC-12 Guardrail, MH-47E Chinook, MH-60K Black Hawk, OH-58C/D Kiowa, UH-1N Twin Huey, UH-1H Iroquois, UH-1V Iroquois, UH-60A/L/Q Blackhawk, V-22 Osprey	Litton Industries, Northrop Grumman
AN/APR-43	Compass Sail Clockwise radio frequency receiving continuous wave (CW) launch warning system, updated AN/ALR-64	A-7 Corsair II, F-4 Phantom II, F-14 Tomcat	
AN/APR-44	Radar warning receiver operating in the 14.5–16.5 GHz (2.07–1.82 cm) range	AH-1 Cobra, EH-60A Black Hawk, MH-60K Black Hawk, OV-1 Mohawk, RU-21 Ute, RV-1D Mohawk, UH-60L Black Hawk	
AN/APR-46	Wideband microwave receiving systems	MC-130E Combat Talon I, MC-130H Combat Talon II, AC-130H Spectre	
AN/APR-47	Electronic Support Measures (ESM) system	F-4G Wild Weasel V	
AN/APR-48	50 lb (23 kg) mast mounted Radar Frequency Interferometer (RFI) 360º target acquisition and cueing direction finder	AH-64D Apache Longbow, OH-58D Kiowa Warrior	Lockheed Martin
AN/APR-50	Electronic Support Measures (ESM) system covering 500–1,000 MHz (59.96–29.98 cm)	B-2 Spirit	Lockheed Martin, BAE

AN/APS – Airborne Radar Detection/Range and Bearing Search Systems
Designation	Purpose/Description	Location/Used By	Manufacturer
AN/APS-2	S-band surface-search anti-submarine warfare radar and weather radar, also called WSR-1/3/4	US Coast Guard blimps, National Weather Service	Philco
AN/APS-11	200 watt short range UHF tail warning radar operating from 410–420 MHz (73–71 cm) at a range of 850 yd (780 m), derived from Monica radar system, used with AN/MSQ-1	P-38L Lightning, P-47D Razorback, P-51 Mustang, P-61 Black Widow, P-63 Kingcobra, P-82D Twin Mustang, PBJ-1	
AN/APS-13	Archie tail warning radar operating at 300 MHz (1.00 m), derived from the ARI 5664 Monica used by the RAF	US Army Air Forces	
AN/APS-15	Mickey set ground scanning X-band bombing radar, also known as H2X	B-17 Flying Fortress, B-24 Liberator, P-38 Lightning	MIT Radiation Laboratory
AN/APS-20	S-band airborne early warning anti-submarine analog maritime surveillance and weather radar	A-1 Skyraider, AF-2W Guardian, EA-1E Skyraider, EC-121 Warning Star, P-2 Neptune, PB-1W Flying Fortress, TBM-3W Avenger, WB-29 Superfortress, ZPG-2W blimp	General Electric, Hazeltine Corp
AN/APS-38	50 kW X-band warning and attack radar operating from 9.32–10 GHz (3.22–3.00 cm) with a range of 37 nmi (43 mi; 69 km)	F-4G Wild Weasel V	McDonnell Douglas, Philco
AN/APS-80	143 kW X-band surface-search radar, forerunner of AN/APS-88, AN/APS-115 and AN/APY-10 family of radars	P-3A/B Orion	Texas Instruments
AN/APS-82	1 MW S-band airborne early warning and control 3D radar with ground stabilization, turn stabilization and target height finder operating from 2.85–2.91 GHz (10.52–10.30 cm) with a range of 180 nmi (210 mi; 330 km)	E-1B Tracer	Hazeltine Corp
AN/APS-88	45 kW X-band surface-search radar with a range of 35 nmi (40 mi; 65 km), developed from AN/APS-80	SHU-16B Albatross, S-2 Tracker	Texas Instruments
AN/APS-94	Side-looking surveillance and mapping radar	OV-1D Mohawk	
AN/APS-96	Airborne early warning and control UHF-band radar operating at 400–450 MHz (75–67 cm) with a range of 200 nmi (230 mi; 370 km) and up to 30,000 ft (9,100 m) altitude with a 26 ft (8 m) diameter saucer shaped radome, replaced by AN/APS-120	E-2 Hawkeye	General Electric
AN/APS-105	Radar receiving set	B-52 Stratofortress	Dalmo-Victor
AN/APS-107	Radar warning receiver target acquisition system for AGM-78	EF-4D Wild Weasel IV	
AN/APS-109	Radar warning receiver system, replaced by AN/ALR-62	F-111 Aardvark	Dalmo-Victor
AN/APS-115	143 kW X-band anti-submarine warfare surface-search radar operating from 8.5–9.6 GHz (3.53–3.12 cm) with a range of 200 nmi (230 mi; 370 km), developed from AN/APS-80	P-3C Orion	Texas Instruments
AN/APS-116	500 kW X-band navigation and anti-submarine warfare radar operating between 9.5–10 GHz (3.2–3.0 cm) and a range of 150 nmi (170 mi; 280 km), forerunner of AN/APS-137 and AN/APS-506	P-3 Orion, S-3A Viking	Motorola
AN/APS-120	1 MW long range UHF air and surface-search radar operating from 406–450 MHz (0.74–0.67 m) with a range of 200 nmi (230 mi; 370 km), replaced AN/APS-96, replaced by AN/APS-125	E-2C Hawkeye	General Electric
AN/APS-124	210 lb (95 kg) 350 kW X-band 360° anti-submarine warfare surveillance/search radar operating from 6.2–10.9 GHz (4.84–2.75 cm) with a range of 160 nmi (180 mi; 300 km), part of Light Airborne Multi-Purpose System (LAMPS III), developed from AN/APS-115 and AN/APS-116, replaced by AN/APS-147	SH-60B Seahawk, SH-60F Seahawk	Raytheon, Texas Instruments
AN/APS-125	1 MW long range UHF air and search pulse-Doppler radar operating from 406–450 MHz (0.74–0.67 m) with a range of 250 nmi (290 mi; 460 km), replaced AN/APS-120, forerunner of AN/APS-138	E-2C Hawkeye	Lockheed Martin
AN/APS-127	200 kW X-band anti-submarine warfare radar with a range of 160 nmi (180 mi; 300 km), developed from AN/APS-124, replaced by AN/APS-143	US Coast Guard HU-25 Guardian	Texas Instruments
AN/APS-129	343 lb (156 kg) 70 kW airborne navigation/search radar operating from 9.355–9.395 GHz (3.205–3.191 cm)	A-6 Intruder	Naval Avionics Facility, Indianapolis
AN/APS-130	382 lb (173 kg) 100 kW K_{u}-band surveillance and navigation radar operating from 12–18 GHz (2.50–1.67 cm) with a range of 150 nmi (170 mi; 280 km), developed from AN/APQ-156 and AN/APQ-129, replaced AN/APQ-192, forerunner of AN/APS-146	EA-6B Prowler	Northrop Grumman (Note: The AN/APS-130 was originally manufactured by Norden Systems beginning in 1976 which was sold to Westinghouse Electric Corp then finally to Northrop Grumman)
AN/APS-133	120 lb (54 kg) 65 kW X-band multimode digital color weather/terrain-mapping/beacon navigation radar operating from 9.37–9.38 GHz (3.20–3.20 cm) and 9.35–9.315 GHz (3.21–3.22 cm) beacon with a range of 300 nmi (350 mi; 560 km), replaced by AN/APS-150	E-4B NEACP, Boeing VC-137C, C-5 Galaxy, C-17 Globemaster III, C-130 Hercules, C-141 Starlifter, E-3 Sentry, E-6 Mercury, E-8C Joint STARS, EA-6B Prowler, KC-10 Extender, KC-130 Tanker	Bendix Corp, Honeywell Aerospace
AN/APS-134	527 lb (239 kg) 500 kW X-band anti-submarine warfare inverse synthetic-aperture radar (ISAR) operating from 9.5–10 GHz (3.16–3.00 cm) with a range of 150 nmi (170 mi; 280 km), derived from AN/APS-116 and AN/APS-124, replaced by AN/APS-137	HC-130H Hercules, P-3C Orion	Texas Instruments, Raytheon
AN/APS-137	551 lb (250 kg) 50 kW multipurpose X-band surveillance synthetic-aperture/Inverse synthetic-aperture radar for standoff target identification operating from 9.3–10.1 GHz (3.22–2.97 cm) for a range of 250 nmi (290 mi; 460 km), developed from AN/APS-116, replaced AN/APS-134, forerunner of AN/APY-10	ES-3A Shadow, HC-130H Hercules, P-3C Orion, S-3B Viking	Raytheon,
AN/APS-138	1 MW long range UHF air and search pulse-Doppler radar operating from 406–450 MHz (0.74–0.67 m), replaced AN/APS-125, extending range to 300 nmi (350 mi; 560 km), forerunner of AN/APS-139	E-2C Hawkeye	General Electric, Lockheed martin
AN/APS-143	Ocean Eye 8 kW X-band maritime surveillance radar operating from 9.25–9.7 GHz (3.24–3.09 cm) with a range of 256 nmi (295 mi; 474 km)		Telephonics
AN/APS-145	High power 1 MW UHF Doppler airborne early-warning and control (AEW&C) radar with a 1,700 lb (770 kg) Total Radiation Aperture Control-Antenna (TRAC-A) operating from 400–450 MHz (0.75–0.67 m) with a range greater that 350 nmi (400 mi; 650 km), upgrade of AN/APS-138, replaced by AN/APY-9	E-2C Hawkeye	General Electric, Lockheed Martin
AN/APS-146	60 kW K_{u}-band surveillance and navigation radar with a range of 200 nmi (230 mi; 370 km), upgraded AN/APS-130	EA-6B Prowler, Did not enter service	Northrop Grumman
AN/APS-147	X-band inverse synthetic-aperture radar with a range of 200 nmi (230 mi; 370 km), forerunner of AN/APS-153	MH-60R Seahawk	Telephonics
AN/APS-148	Sea Vue X-band radar, improved AN/APS-137		Raytheon
AN/APS-149	Wide aperture active electronically scanned array (AESA) X-band Littoral Surveillance Radar System (LSRS), forerunner of AN/APY-10	P-3C Orion	Texas Instruments, Raytheon
AN/APS-153	X-band inverse synthetic-aperture radar with a range of 200 nmi (230 mi; 370 km), improved AN/APS-147	MH-60R Seahawk	Telephonics
AN/APS-154	Advanced Airborne Sensor (AAS)	P-8 Poseidon	Raytheon
AN/APS-506	X-band anti-submarine warfare radar, developed from AN/APS-116	P-3 Orion	Raytheon

AN/APW – Airborne Radar Automatic/Remote Flight Control Systems
Designation	Purpose/Description	Location/Used By	Manufacturer
AN/APW-11	137 watt Bombing Air Radar Guidance System and transponder operating from 2.7–2.95 GHz (0.111–0.102 m), used with AN/MSQ-1, airborne part of Matador Automatic Radar Control (MARC)	B-57 Canberra, F-84F Thunderstreak, MGM-1 Matador, North American X-10	

AN/APX – Airborne Radar Identification/Recognition Systems
Designation	Purpose/Description	Location/Used By	Manufacturer
AN/APX-1	Identification Friend or Foe (IFF) system		Hazeltine Corp
AN/APX-6	L-band IFF Mark X (SIF) transponder system	A-4 Skyhawk, B-47 Stratojet, F-11 Tiger, F-84F Thunderstreak, F5D Skylancer, P-3A/B Orion	Hazeltine Corp
AN/APX-7	2 kW airborne L-band identification friend or foe transponder operating from 1.03–1.09 GHz (29–28 cm)		Packard Bell
AN/APX-64	Identification Friend or Foe (IFF) system	A-4 Skyhawk,	Hazeltine Corp
AN/APX-72	15 lb (6.8 kg) Identification Friend or Foe (IFF) transponder transmitting at 1.09 GHz (27.50 cm) and receiving at 1.03 GHz (29.11 cm), replaced by AN/APX-117	US Air Force, US Army, US Navy, US Marine Corps	Bendix Corp, Honeywell Aerospace, Hazeltine Corp, Associated Aircraft Manufacturing & Sales Inc
AN/APX-76	37 lb (17 kg) 2 kW L-band jamming resistant Identification Friend or Foe (IFF) interrogator using IFF Mark X (SIF) and IFF Mark XII receiving at 1.03 GHz (29.11 cm) and transmitting at 1.09 GHz (27.50 cm), replaced by AN/APX-111	C-130T Hercules, E-2C Hawkeye, F-4J Phantom II, F-14 Tomcat, F-15 Eagle, P-3 Orion, S-3 Viking, SH-60B/F Seahawk	BAE
AN/APX-80	Combat Tree Identification Friend or Foe (IFF) non-cooperative target recognition interrogation system, comprises AN/APX-76 and AN/APX-81	F-4D Phantom II, F-4E Phantom II	
AN/APX-81	Identification Friend or Foe (IFF) system with a range of 60 nmi (69 mi; 110 km)	F-4 Phantom II	
AN/APX-89	Identification Friend or Foe (IFF) system	F-4J Phantom II	
AN/APX-100	10 lb (4.5 kg) 500 watt Identification Friend or Foe (IFF) system using IFF Mark X (SIF) and IFF Mark XII receiving at 1.03 GHz (0.29 m) and transmitting at 1.09 GHz (0.28 m), replaced by AN/APX-111	AH-1S Cobra, AH-64 Apache, C-5B Galaxy, C-9 Nightingale, C-12 Huron, C-17 Globemaster III, C-130 Hercules, CH-47D Chinook, F/A-18 Hornet, HH-60H Rescue Hawk, HH-65A Dolphin, KC-135 Stratotanker, Learjet C-21, MH-60 Jayhawk, MH-60G Pave Hawk, OH-58D Kiowa, RQ/MQ-1 Predator, RQ-4 Global Hawk, SH-60B/F Seahawk, T-45 Goshawk, UH-60 Black Hawk	Bendix/King, Raytheon
AN/APX-101	14.4 lb (6.5 kg) 500 watt Identification Friend or Foe (IFF) transponder using IFF Mark XII receiving at 1.03 GHz (29.11 cm) and transmitting at 1.09 GHz (27.50 cm), replaced by AN/APX-111	A-10A Thunderbolt II, F-5E/F Tiger II, F-15 Eagle, F-15E Strike Eagle, F-16 Fighting Falcon, KC-10 Extender	Teledyne
AN/APX-103	Identification Friend or Foe (IFF) transponder using IFF Mark X (SIF) and IFF Mark XII, used with AN/APY-1 or AN/APY-2	E-3 Sentry	Telephonics
AN/APX-111	45.5 lb (20.6 kg) 1.35 kW Identification Friend or Foe (IFF) Combined Interrogator/Transponder (CIT) system using IFF Mark XII with Mode S interrogating at 1.03 GHz (29.11 cm) and transponding at 1.09 GHz (27.50 cm) with a range of 100 nmi (120 mi; 190 km), replaced AN/APX-76, AN/APX-100 and AN/APX-101	F/A-18 Hornet	BAE
AN/APX-113	42.5 lb (19.3 kg) 2.4 kW Advanced Identification Friend or Foe (AIFF) Combined Interrogator/Transponder (CIT) system using IFF Mark XII with Mode S interrogating at 1.03 GHz (29.11 cm) and transponding at 1.09 GHz (27.50 cm) with a range of 100 nmi (120 mi; 190 km), modified AN/APX-111	F-16 Fighting Falcon	BAE
AN/APX-117	9.8 lb (4.4 kg) 500 watt Identification Friend or Foe Common Transponder (CXP) using IFF Mark XII with Mode S transmitting at 1.09 GHz (27.50 cm) and receiving at 1.03 GHz (29.11 cm), developed from AN/APX-111 and AN/APX-113, replaced AN/APX-72, AN/APX-100 and AN/APX-101	US Army, US Coast Guard, US Navy	BAE
AN/APX-118	9.8 lb (4.4 kg) 500 watt Identification Friend or Foe Common Transponder (CXP) using IFF Mark XII with Mode S and embedded Mode 4 crypto transmitting at 1.09 GHz (27.50 cm) and receiving at 1.03 GHz (29.11 cm), developed from AN/APX-111 and AN/APX-113, replaced AN/APX-72, AN/APX-100 and AN/APX-101	US Army, US Coast Guard, US Navy	BAE
AN/APX-125	Airborne 2.4 kW combined Identification Friend or Foe (IFF) interrogator/transponder system using IFF Mark XII with Mode S with a range of over 100 nmi (120 mi; 190 km)	F-16 Fighting Falcon	BAE
AN/APX-126	Airborne 2.4 kW combined Identification Friend or Foe (IFF) interrogator/transponder system using IFF Mark XII with Mode S with a range of over 100 nmi (120 mi; 190 km)	F-16 Fighting Falcon	BAE

AN/APY – Airborne Radar Surveillance and Control Systems
Designation	Purpose/Description	Location/Used By	Manufacturer
AN/APY-1	9,826 lb (4,457 kg) S-band Airborne Early Warning and Control (AEW&C) passive electronically scanned array surveillance radar operating from 2–4 GHz (14.99–7.49 cm) with a 216 nmi (249 mi; 400 km) range	E-3 Sentry	Northrop Grumman
AN/APY-2	9,826 lb (4,457 kg) S-band Airborne Early Warning and Control (AEW&C) passive electronically scanned array surveillance radar, improved AN/APY-1 with an enhanced maritime surveillance mode and a range of 300 nmi (350 mi; 560 km)	E-3 Sentry	Northrop Grumman
AN/APY-3	4,200 lb (1,900 kg) X-band planar passive phased array multimode surface-search/surveillance synthetic-aperture side-looking airborne radar with a range of 124 nmi (143 mi; 230 km), works with AN/TSQ-179	E-8 Joint STARS (JSTARS)	Norden Systems, Northrop Grumman
AN/APY-6	625 lb (283 kg) 13 kW K_{u}-band planar passive phased array multimode ground moving target indicator (GMTI) inverse synthetic-aperture radar (ISAR) operating from 16.5–16.6 GHz (1.82–1.81 cm) with a range of 100 nmi (120 mi; 190 km), developed from AN/APG-76		Northrop Grumman
AN/APY-7	Pave Mover X-band solid state Active Electronically Scanned Array (AESA) radar with a 152 mi (245 km) range, developed from AN/APY-3		Northrop Grumman
AN/APY-9	Active Electronically Scanned Array (AESA) UHF multi-mode Airborne Early Warning and Control (AEW&C) Doppler radar operating between 0.3–3.0 GHz (99.93–9.99 cm) with a range of 350 nmi (400 mi; 650 km), replaced AN/APS-145	E-2D Advanced Hawkeye	Lockheed Martin
AN/APY-10	X-band multifunction mechanically scanned high-resolution inverse synthetic-aperture surveillance Doppler radar with a range of 250 nmi (290 mi; 460 km), developed from AN/APS-149, replaced AN/APS-137	P-8 Poseidon	Texas Instruments, Raytheon

=== AQx – Piloted Aircraft Sonar Systems ===
AN/AQA – Airborne Sonar Auxiliary Assemblies
Designation	Purpose/Description	Location/Used By	Manufacturer
AN/AQA-7	Airborne anti-submarine warfare (ASW) sonobuoy signal processor, used with AN/SSQ-53, AN/SSQ-62 and AN/SSQ-77	P-3 Orion	Ultra Electronics

AN/AQM – Airborne Sonar Maintenance/Test Assembly Systems
Designation	Purpose/Description	Location/Used By	Manufacturer
AN/AQM-24	Sonar Test Central, supports testing of AN/AQS-13 related systems and components	US Navy	

AN/AQS – Airborne Sonar Detection/Range and Bearing Search Systems
Designation	Purpose/Description	Location/Used By	Manufacturer
AN/AQS-10	Anti-submarine warfare (ASW) helicopter dipping active sonar suspended from a 250 ft (76 m) cable with a range of 11.36 mi (18.28 km)	SH-3A Sea King	Bendix Corp
AN/AQS-13	Anti-submarine warfare (ASW) helicopter dipping active/passive sonobuoy with a range of 4.0 nmi (7.4 km), improved AN/AQS-10	SH-3 Sea King, SH-60F Oceanhawk	L3Harris
AN/AQS-14	Helicopter mine countermeasure active side-looking sonar system with a range of 980 yd (0.9 km)	RH-53D Sea Stallion, Sikorsky S-80, MH-53E Sea Dragon	
AN/AQS-18	Anti-submarine warfare (ASW) helicopter dipping active/passive sonobuoy with a range of 4.0 nmi (7.4 km), export version of AN/AQS-13F		L3Harris
AN/AQS-20	Helicopter or ship-borne underwater towed mine countermeasure sonar system with a range of 0.59 nmi (1.1 km) (Note: Only ten units of the AN/AQS-20 were purchased before the system was canceled by the US Navy in 2016)	MH-60S Knighthawk, MH-53E Sea Dragon, MH-60S Knighthawk	Raytheon
AN/AQS-22	600 lb (270 kg) active/passive shallow water advanced dipping Airborne Low Frequency Sonar (ALFS), also known as Folding Light Acoustic System for Helicopters (FLASH), with a range of 8.0 nmi (14.8 km)	MH-60R Seahawk	ThalesRaytheonSystems
AN/AQS-24	Airborne Mine Countermeasures (AMCM) towed mine detecting synthetic-aperture sonar (SAS) operating at speeds up to 18 knots (33 km/h; 21 mph)	MH-53E Sea Dragon	Northrop Grumman
AN/AQS-176	Terrain following radar, replaced AN/ASQ-38, replaced by AN/APQ-166	B-52G/H Stratofortress	
AN/AQS-502	Anti-submarine warfare (ASW) helicopter dipping active sonobuoy suspended from a 443 ft (135 m) cable with an effective range of 1 nmi (1.9 km), export version of AN/AQS-13B	CH-124 Sea King	L3Harris

=== ARx – Piloted Aircraft Radio Systems ===
AN/ARA – Airborne Radio Auxiliary Assembly Systems
Designation	Purpose/Description	Location/Used By	Manufacturer
AN/ARA-25	24.7 lb (11.2 kg) UHF AM/CW direction finding receiver operating from 225–399.9 MHz (1.33–0.75 m) in 18 channels	A-3 Skywarrior, A-4F Skyhawk, B-47 Stratojet, F-11 Tiger, SH-3A Sea King, P-3A/B Orion, UH-3H Sea King,	
AN/ARA-26	Control-keyer group providing automatic motor-driven keying for transmitting distress signals on distress frequencies	B-47 Stratojet	
AN/ARA-50	UHF direction finding radio operating from 225–400 MHz (1.33–0.75 m)	C-130T Hercules,	
AN/ARA-60	Teletype communications system	E-4B NEACP, Boeing EC-135	
AN/ARA-63	Instrument Carrier Landing System (ICLS) Receiving-Decoding Group (R-DG), receives AN/SPN-41 guidance signals	C-130T Hercules, E-2C Hawkeye	
AN/ARA-64	TACSATCOM (tactical satellite communications) UHF terminal operating at 70 MHz (4.28 m)		Electronic Communications

AN/ARC – Airborne Radio Communications Systems
Designation	Purpose/Description	Location/Used By	Manufacturer
AN/ARC-1	6 watt VHF AM radio transceiver operating between 100–156 MHz (3.00–1.92 m) over 10 preset channels with 280 mi (450 km) range at 50,000 ft (15,000 m)		Western Electric
AN/ARC-3	8 watt VHF AM radio operating between 100–156 MHz (3.00–1.92 m) over 8 preset crystal controlled channels		
AN/ARC-5	Multi-channel AM CW/MCW vacuum-tube radio transmitter/receiver set operating from 0.19–258 MHz (1,577.86–1.16 m) depending on configuration	US Navy	Aircraft Radio Corp, Stromberg-Carlson, Western Electric
AN/ARC-8	203.2 lb (92.2 kg) high power long range AM HF voice/tone/telegraph transceiver transmitting from 200–500 kHz (1,498.96–599.58 m) and 2–18 MHz (149.90–16.66 m) at 90 watts on 11 preset channels simultaneously receiving from 200–500 kHz (1,498.96–599.58 m) or 1.5–18 MHz (199.86–16.66 m), consisted of AN/ARR-11 and AN/ART-13	USAAF/US Air Force	Rockwell Collins
AN/ARC-12	2 watt AM radio transceiver operating between 190–550 kHz (1.58–0.55 km) and 116–148 MHz (2.58–2.03 m)		
AN/ARC-21	100 watt long-range HF vacuum tube Single-sideband (SSB) radio transceiver operating from 2–24 MHz (149.90–12.49 m) over 20 channels up to 50,000 ft (15,240.00 m), replaced by AN/ARC-65	B-47 Stratojet, B-52 Stratofortress, RB-66 Destroyer	RCA Corp
AN/ARC-25	65 watt high power long range AM HF voice/tone/CW transceiver weighing more than 475.5 lb (215.7 kg) receiving between 1.5–18.5 MHz (199.86–16.20 m) and transmitting from 2–18 MHz (149.90–16.66 m) both on 10 preset channels, consisted of AN/ARR-15 and AN/ART-13, replaced by AN/ARC-38	US Navy	
AN/ARC-27	9 watt UHF AM radio transceiver weighing 71 lb (32 kg) operating between 225–400 MHz (1.33–0.75 m) over 1,750 channels, the first UHF radio designed for use in aircraft	A-4 Skyhawk, B-47 Stratojet, F5D Skylancer, F-11 Tiger, T-33 Shooting Star	Collins Radio
AN/ARC-34	8 watt UHF radio system operating between 225–399.9 MHz (1.33–0.75 m), unpressurized version of AN/ARC-133	A-37 Dragonfly, B-52 Stratofortress, B-57 Canberra, C-130 Hercules, C-135 Stratolifter, C-137 Stratoliner, C-140 JetStar, F-5 Freedom Fighter, F-84F Thunderstreak, F-86 Sabre, F-100 Super Sabre, F-101 Voodoo, F-102 Delta Dagger, HH-43 Huskie, Sikorsky H-53, T-38 Talon, T-39 Sabreliner, U-2 Dragonlady	RCA Corp, Magnavox
AN/ARC-36	8 watt AM radio transceiver operating between 100–156 MHz (3.00–1.92 m)		
AN/ARC-38	100 watt HF AM/CW/SSB transceiver operating from 2–25 MHz (149.90–11.99 m) over 20 channels, forerunner to AN/ARC-58, replaced AN/ARC-25	US Navy	Collins Radio
AN/ARC-44	8 watt 39 lb (18 kg) FM radio transceiver operating between 24–51.9 MHz (12.49–5.78 m) over 280 channels for about 50 mi (80 km), replaced by AN/ARC-54		
AN/ARC-45	2 watt UHF AM radio transceiver operating between 225–400 MHz (1.33–0.75 m) over 1,750 channels	US Army	
AN/ARC-51	20 watt 31 lb (14 kg) UHF AM radio transceiver operating from 225–400 MHz (1.33–0.75 m), replaced AN/ARC-55, used in AN/TSQ-71, replaced by AN/ARC-116	A-4 Skyhawk, P-3A/B Orion	Admiral Corp
AN/ARC-54	10 watt FM radio transceiver operating between 30–69.95 MHz (9.99–4.29 m), replaced AN/ARC-44		
AN/ARC-55	UHF AM radio transceiver operating from 225–400 MHz (1.33–0.75 m), replaced by AN/ARC-51	US Army	
AN/ARC-58	1 kW HF AM/CW/SSB transceiver operating from 2–30 MHz (149.90–9.99 m), developed from AN/ARC-38		Collins Radio
AN/ARC-60	0.5 watt VHF AM radio transceiver operating from 228–258 MHz (1.31–1.16 m)		Aircraft Radio Corp
AN/ARC-65	230 watt long range HF Single-sideband (SSB) radio system operating from 2–24 MHz (149.90–12.49 m), replaced AN/ARC-21		RCA Corp
AN/ARC-73	25 watt AM radio transceiver operating from 116–149.95 MHz (2.58–2.00 m), used in AN/TSQ-71		
AN/ARC-85	50 watt 116 lb (53 kg) UHF simplex AM radio transceiver operating from 225–400 MHz (1.33–0.75 m), paired with AN/ASQ-59		
AN/ARC-89	50 watt SAC Airborne Communications System UHF FM relay radio with 12 full duplex voice channels operating from 225–399.95 MHz (133.24–74.96 cm), used with AN/ACC-1 and AN/ACC-2, replaced by AN/ARC-171	B-47 Stratojet	E-Systems
AN/ARC-96	20 kW Very Low Frequency/Low Frequency (VLF/LF) radio system operating between 17–60 kHz (17.63–5.00 km)		Westinghouse Electric Corp
AN/ARC-97	23 lb (10 kg) UHF AM two-way radio repeater operating from 225–400 MHz (1.33–0.75 m)		RCA Corp
AN/ARC-109	30 watt solid-state UHF radio transceiver operating from 225–400 MHz (1.33–0.75 m) over 3,500 channels (20 preset)		Collins Radio
AN/ARC-114	10 watt 8 lb (3.6 kg) solid-state FM 800 channel radio transceiver operating from 30–69.95 MHz (9.99–4.29 m)		
AN/ARC-115	VHF AM transceiver		GTE-Sylvania
AN/ARC-116	10 watt 10 lb (4.5 kg) solid-state VHF AM radio transceiver, replaced AN/ARC-51		
AN/ARC-133	UHF radio communication system, pressurized version of AN/ARC-34		Magnavox
AN/ARC-159	UHF command radio operating from 225–400 MHz (1.33–0.75 m)	C-130T Hercules, SH-2F Seasprite,	
AN/ARC-164	10 watt UHF AM Have Quick capable radio system operating from 225–399.975 MHz (1.33–0.75 m), replaced by AN/ARC-232	B-52G/H Stratofortress, B-1B Lancer, C/EC/RC-26D, C-5 Galaxy, KC-135 Stratotanker, C-23 Sherpa, C-130 Hercules, C-141 Starlifter, F-15 Eagle, A-10 Thunderbolt II, F-16 Fighting Falcon, UH-1D Iroquois, CH-47 Chinook, CH-53 Sea Stallion, Sikorsky H-60, S-3B Viking	Magnavox, Raytheon
AN/ARC-171	39 lb (18 kg) 100 watt UHF AM/FM/Frequency-shift keying (FSK) radio with electronic counter-countermeasures and MILSTAR capabilities operating from 225–339.975 MHz (1.33–0.88 m) over 7,000 channels, replaced AN/ARC-89, replaced by AN/ARC-204	B-1B Lancer, B-52 Stratofortress, Boeing EC-135, Boeing RC-135, E-3 Sentry, E-4B NEACP, E-6 Mercury, Lockheed EC-130, KC-10 Extender	Rockwell Collins
AN/ARC-182	13.3 lb (6.0 kg) 15 watt VHF/UHF AM/FM two-way multi-mode Have Quick capable radio transceiver operating from 30–400 MHz (9.99–0.75 m), forerunner of AN/ARC-210	US Navy, US Marine Corps, US Coast Guard	Rockwell Collins
AN/ARC-186	13 lb (5.9 kg) 10 watt VHF AM/FM two-way radio system transmitting on AM from 116–151.975 MHz (2.58–1.97 m) and receiving on AM 108–115.975 MHz (2.78–2.58 m) as well as transmit/receive on FM 30–87.975 MHz (9.99–3.41 m) over 20 preset channels, replaced by AN/ARC-222	A-10 Thunderbolt II, AC-130 Spectre, AH-1 SuperCobra, AH-64 Apache, B-52 Stratofortress, C-5 Galaxy, C-9 Nightingale, C-130 Hercules, C-135 Stratolifter, CH-47 Chinook, E-8 Joint STARS (JSTARS), UH-3H Sea King, and many others	Rockwell Collins
AN/ARC-187	21.7 lb (9.8 kg) secure UHF 30 watt AM and 100 watt FM/Frequency-shift keying (FSK) radio with Have Quick II capability operating between 225–399.975 MHz (133.24–74.95 cm) over 7,000 channels, developed from AN/ARC-164	AC-130U Spooky II, C-17 Globemaster III, EC-130E Commando Solo, EP-3E Aries, ES-3A Shadow, MC-130H Combat Talon II, MH-53J Pave Low III, P-3C Orion, S-3B Viking	Raytheon
AN/ARC-190	77.5 lb (35.2 kg) 400 watt software operated long distance HF Single-sideband (SSB) Amplitude Modulated Equivalent (AME)/CW radio system operating from 2–30 MHz (149.90–9.99 m) up to 70,000 ft (21,000 m) altitude	B-1 Lancer, B-52 Stratofortress, Boeing E-4, C-5 Galaxy, C-9A Nightingale, C-17 Globemaster III, C-20 Gulfstream IV, C-130H Hercules, C-130J Super Hercules, C-130T Hercules, C-141 Starlifter, CH-53 Sea Stallion, E-3 Sentry, E-8 JSTARS, F-15 Eagle, F-16 Fighting Falcon, KC-10 Extender, KC-135 Stratotanker, S-2 Tracker, Sikorsky H-60, V-22 Osprey	Rockwell Collins
AN/ARC-199	26.1 lb (11.8 kg) 500 watt HF single-sideband (SSB) Amplitude Modulated Equivalent (AME)/CW radio operating from 2–30 MHz (149.90–9.99 m), works with AN/VRC-86, replaced by AN/ARC-220	US Army	Bendix/King, AlliedSignal
AN/ARC-200	38.5 lb (17.5 kg) 200 watt HF Single-sideband (SSB) Amplitude Modulated Equivalent (AME)/CW radio operating from 2–30 MHz (149.90–9.99 m), ruggedized AN/ARC-199	F-16 Fighting Falcon	AlliedSignal
AN/ARC-207	1 kW HF Single-sideband (SSB) Amplitude Modulated Equivalent (AME)/CW radio operating from 2–30 MHz (149.90–9.99 m), developed from AN/ARC-153, replaced AN/ARC-143	P-3C Orion	Rockwell Collins
AN/ARC-210	23 watt 12.2 lb (5.5 kg) multi-mode VHF/UHF/SATCOM Have Quick and SINCGARS capable two-way radio operating from 30–941 MHz (9.99–0.32 m), improved AN/ARC-182	AV-8B Harrier II, B-52H Stratofortress, C-130T Hercules EA-18G Growler, F-16 Fighting Falcon, F/A-18C/D Hornet, F/A-18E/F Super Hornet, and many more	Rockwell Collins
AN/ARC-220	36.75 lb (16.67 kg) 175 watt long range voice/data HF Single-sideband (SSB) Amplitude Modulated Equivalent (AME)/CW radio with electronic counter-countermeasures (ECCM) frequency hopping capability operating from 2–30 MHz (149.90–9.99 m), replaced AN/ARC-199	AH-64D Apache Longbow, CH-47D Chinook, UH-1 Iroquois, UH-60 Black Hawk, OH-58 Kiowa	Rockwell Collins
AN/ARC-222	11.6 lb (5.3 kg) VHF SINCGARS transceiver operating from 108–155.975 MHz (2.78–1.92 m) AM and 30–87.975 MHz (9.99–3.41 m) FM and 156.025–162.025 MHz (1.92–1.85 m) maritime band, replaced AN/ARC-186	C-130J Super Hercules, E-8 Joint STARS (JSTARS), F-16C/D Fighting Falcon, MC-130H Combat Talon II	Raytheon
AN/ARC-231	Skyfire VHF/UHF/SATCOM AM/FM Have Quick and SINCGARS capable software-defined radio operating from 30–512 MHz (9.99–0.59 m)		BAE
AN/ARC-232	VHF/UHF/SATCOM AM/FM Have Quick and SINCGARS capable software-defined radio operating from 30–512 MHz (9.99–0.59 m), replaced AN/ARC-164		Raytheon
AN/ARC-302	AM radio transceiver operating from 118–136 MHz (2.54–2.20 m)		

AN/ARN – Airborne Radio Navigation Systems
Designation	Purpose/Description	Location/Used By	Manufacturer
AN/ARN-5	11 lb (5.0 kg) glide path receiver and visual indication landing guidance system operating at 332.6 MHz (90.14 cm) or 333.8 MHz (89.81 cm) or 335 MHz (89.49 cm) CW with a 15 mi (24 km) range, used with AN/CRN-2		
AN/ARN-6	55 lb (25 kg) automatic radio compass operating between 100–1,750 kHz (2,998–171 m) over 4 frequency bands in compass mode and 2.8–5.9 MHz (10,706.87–5,081.23 cm) for emergency communications (not compass) mode using CW or MCW modulation	B-47 Stratojet, F-84F Thunderstreak	Bendix Corp
AN/ARN-7	98 lb (44 kg) manually tuned long range automatic vacuum-tube CW radio compass operating between 100–1,750 kHz (2,998–171 m) for a 100 mi (160 km) range	TB-32-10-CF Dominator	Bendix Corp
AN/ARN-11	60 lb (27 kg) radio compass and general radio receiver operating from 200–400 kHz (1,498.96–749.48 m) or 0.55–1.2 MHz (545.08–249.83 m) in compass mode or 200–400 kHz (1,498.96–749.48 m), 0.5–1.2 MHz (599.58–249.83 m) or 2.9–6 MHz (103.38–49.97 m) communications receiver mode over a range of 150 mi (240 km)		
AN/ARN-12	Lightweight 25 lb (11 kg) marker beacon MCW receiver operating at 75 MHz (4.00 m) giving aural and visual indications up to altitudes of 35,000 ft (11,000 m)	A-4F Skyhawk, B-47 Stratojet	
AN/ARN-14	68.8 lb (31.2 kg) double superheterodyne VHF omnidirectional range (VOR) navigation receiver operating from 108–135.9 MHz (2.78–2.21 m) over 280 channels with a 300 mi (480 km) range and up to 50,000 ft (15,000 m) altitude	A-4F Skyhawk, B-47 Stratojet, F-11 Tiger	Rockwell Collins, Bendix Corp
AN/ARN-21	Tactical air navigation system (TACAN) system operating in the UHF range from 1.025–1.15 GHz (29.25–26.07 cm) over 252 channels	A-4 Skyhawk, F5D Skylancer	Collins Radio, Federal Telegraph Company (ITT), Stromberg-Carlson
AN/ARN-89	Automatic direction finder (ADF)		Emerson Electric
AN/ARN-92	Pave Phantom Long Range Navigation (LORAN-D) receiver	B-52 Stratofortress, C-130 Hercules, F-4D Phantom II, F-105 Thunderchief, RF-4C Phantom II	
AN/ARN-118	34.2 lb (15.5 kg) 100 watt solid-state tactical air navigation system (TACAN) providing distance and bearing at a range of 390 nmi (450 mi; 720 km)	US Air Force, US Navy	Rockwell Collins
AN/ARN-123	200 channel solid-state VHF omnidirectional range/instrument landing system (VOR/ILS) receiver	AH-1S Cobra, CH-47 Chinook, EH-1H Iroquois, EH-1X Iroquois, EH-60A Black Hawk, HC-130H Hercules, OH-58D Kiowa, T-42 Cochise, UH-1H Iroquois, UH-60 Black Hawk	AlliedSignal, Bendix/King
AN/ARN-126	VHF radio navigation system receiving VOR/ILS signals operating from 108–122 MHz (2.78–2.46 m) and 328.6–335.4 MHz (0.91–0.89 m) integrating data to flight control systems	C-130T Hercules, UH-3H Sea King	AAR Corp.
AN/ARN-138	Multi-Mode Receiver (MMR) precision landing system combining ILS and K_{u}-band Microwave Pulse Coded Scanning Beam (MPCSB) navigation aids with an accuracy of 30 ft (9.1 m), replaced AN/ARA-63	US Navy	Marconi Electronic Systems
AN/ARN-148	Omega/very low frequency (VLF) navigation receiver	UH-60L Black Hawk	Tracor
AN/ARN-151	Satellite signals navigation set (Global Positioning System) all-weather navigation aid	C-130T Hercules, EP-3E Aries	

AN/ARR – Airborne Radio Receiver/Passive Detection Systems
Designation	Purpose/Description	Location/Used By	Manufacturer
AN/ARR-11	Radio communication receiver system, also known as BC-348, part of AN/ARC-8	B-17 Flying Fortress, B-24 Liberator, B-25 Mitchell, B-26 Marauder, B-29 Superfortress, C-47 Skytrain	Belmont Radio, Wells-Gardner, RCA Corp, Stromberg-Carlson
AN/ARR-15	44.3 lb (20.1 kg) general purpose airborne AM HF radio receiving voice/CW/MCW signals between 1.5–18.5 MHz (199.86–16.20 m) on 10 preset channels, part of AN/ARC-25		Collins Radio
AN/ARR-71	Solid-state AM/FM UHF radio receiver with an automatic servo-controlled 3,500 channel tuner operating between 225–399.95 MHz (1.33–0.75 m)		Electronic Communications
AN/ARR-78	Advanced Sonobuoy Communications Link (ASCL) 115.2 lb (52.3 kg) computer controlled radio receiver using 20 receiver modules on 99 VHF channels up to 30,000 ft (9,100 m)	P-3C Orion, S-3B Viking	GEC-Marconi
AN/ARR-88	Panoramic electronic support measures receiver	RB-52B Stratofortress	

AN/ARS – Airborne Radio Detection/Range and Bearing Search Systems
Designation	Purpose/Description	Location/Used By	Manufacturer
AN/ARS-6	Personnel Locator System (PLS) radio navigation set	AC-130H Spectre, UH-3H Sea King	Cubic Corp

AN/ART – Airborne Radio Transmitter Systems
Designation	Purpose/Description	Location/Used By	Manufacturer
AN/ART-13	100 watt radio transmitter operating up to 18 MHz (16.66 m), part of AN/ARC-8 and AN/ARC-25	B-29 Superfortress	Collins Radio, Stewart-Warner
AN/ART-42	High power UHF radio transmitter		
AN/ART-47	1 kW UHF radio transmitter		

=== ASx – Piloted Aircraft Special/Combination Systems ===
AN/ASB – Airborne Special/Combination Bombing Systems
Designation	Purpose/Description	Location/Used By	Manufacturer
AN/ASB-1	Bomb-director radar system	A-3 Skywarrior	Norden Systems
AN/ASB-7	Bomb-director radar system	A-3B Skywarrior	
AN/ASB-15	Bombing/navigation system, replaced by AN/ASQ-48	B-52 Stratofortress	
AN/ASB-19	128 lb (58 kg) Angle Rate Bombing System (ARBS) day/night target acquisition laser/TV tracker integrated with onboard mission computer and head-up display (HUD)	A-4M Skyhawk II, AV-8B Harrier II Plus	Hughes Aircraft

AN/ASC – Airborne Special/Combination Communications Systems
Designation	Purpose/Description	Location/Used By	Manufacturer
AN/ASC-15	285 lb (129 kg) airborne secure command and control (C^{2}) HF/VHF/UHF AM/FM system with Have Quick II and SINCGARS compatibility operating from 2–400 MHz (149.90–0.75 m)	UH-60 Black Hawk	Rockwell International
AN/ASC-21	Air Force Satellite Communications (AFSATCOM) system	E-4B NEACP	Rockwell Collins
AN/ASC-26	Helicopter mounted UHF/VHF Command and Control Communications Central		

AN/ASD – Airborne Special/Combination Direction Finding/Reconnaissance/Surveillance Systems
Designation	Purpose/Description	Location/Used By	Manufacturer
AN/ASD-5	Black Crow magnetic anomaly detector (MAD) passive phased-array antenna direction finder detecting electrical signals (e.g. produced by gasoline engine ignitions, etc.) at average ranges of 5–6 mi (8.0–9.7 km) and could pick up localized deviations in the Earth's magnetic field normally used to detect submerged submarines	AC-130A/E/H Spectre	

AN/ASG – Airborne Special/Combination Fire Control Systems
Designation	Purpose/Description	Location/Used By	Manufacturer
AN/ASG-15	Fire-control radar	B-52G Stratofortress	
AN/ASG-18	Prototype airborne pulse-doppler fire-control radar with a range of 300 mi (480 km)	Did not enter service, XF-108 Rapier, Lockheed YF-12	Hughes Aircraft
AN/ASG-21	Fire-control radar	B-52H Stratofortress	
AN/ASG-22	Air-to-air target lead computing optical sight with amplifier and gyro	F-4D Phantom II	

AN/ASH – Airborne Special/Combination Recording Systems
Designation	Purpose/Description	Location/Used By	Manufacturer
AN/ASH-30	Tactical Electronic Processing & Evaluation System (TERPES)	EA-6B Prowler	

AN/ASN – Airborne Special/Combination Navigational Aid Systems
Designation	Purpose/Description	Location/Used By	Manufacturer
AN/ASN-6	Early Cold War-era 45-pound (20 kg) airborne automatic dead reckoning navigation computer for continuous latitude and longitude based on integrated data from other systems	US Air Force	Ford Instrument Company
AN/ASN-7	Airborne self-conatined automatic dead reckoning navigation computer calculating and continuously displaying course, distance, latitude/longitude based on integrated data from other systems, developed from AN/ASN-6	US Air Force	Ford Instrument Company
AN/ASN-24	Airborne general-purpose digital computer navigation system which computes current position, heading and other information using data from integrated systems	C-141 Starlifter	General Precision's Kearfott Div
AN/ASN-31	Inertial Navigation System (INS)	A-6A Intruder	Litton Industries
AN/ASN-43	Gyrocompass		
AN/ASN-48	Inertial Navigation System	F-4C Phantom II	Litton Industries
AN/ASN-63	Inertial Navigation System	F-4D Phantom II	
AN/ASN-92	55.4 lb (25.1 kg) Carrier Aircraft Inertial Navigation System (CAINS) senses and measures rotation about each of the aircraft's axes, and horizontal, lateral and vertical accelerations, replaced by AN/ASN-130	A-6E Intruder, EA-6B Prowler, E-2C Hawkeye, F-14A Tomcat, RF-4B Phantom II, S-3A Viking	Litton Guidance & Control Systems
AN/ASN-123	Airborne tactical navigation (TACNAV) system and signal data converter, used with AN/ASN-130	EA-6B Prowler, SH-2F Seasprite, SH-3H Sea King	Electro-Methods Inc, Litton Industries
AN/ASN-128	31 lb (14 kg) lightweight Doppler/GPS Navigation System (DGNS) operating up to 10,000 ft (3,000 m)	AH-1 Cobra, AH-64 Apache, CH-47D Chinook, HH-60 Pave Hawk, UH-1 Iroquois, UH-60 Black Hawk	BAE
AN/ASN-130	35 lb (16 kg) third generation mechanical gyroscope based Carrier Aircraft Inertial Navigation System (CAINS IA), used with AN/ASN-123, replaced AN/ASN-92, replaced by AN/ASN-139	EA-6B Prowler, F-14D Super Tomcat, F/A-18 Hornet	Litton Guidance & Control Systems
AN/ASN-137	Doppler radar		GEC-Marconi
AN/ASN-139	Ring laser gyroscope based Carrier Aircraft Inertial Navigation System (CAINS II), replaced AN/ASN-130	AV-8B Harrier II Plus, C-2A Greyhound, E-2C Hawkeye, EA-6B Prowler, F-14D Super Tomcat, F/A-18C/D Hornet, S-3B Viking	Litton Industries
AN/ASN-149	Global Positioning System (GPS)		Rockwell Collins
AN/ASN-150	Tactical navigation system	SH-2G Super Seasprite	Teledyne
AN/ASN-151	Airborne inertial navigation system (INS) integrated with GPS providing precise position, velocity, and time navigation data for all-weather navigation which may also be integrated with other navigational aid systems		Litton Industries
AN/ASN-157	<13-pound (5.9 kg) integrated 3D navigation system operating up to 10,000 ft (3,000 m)	AH-64D Apache Longbow	BAE

AN/ASQ – Airborne Special/Combination Systems
Designation	Purpose/Description	Location/Used By	Manufacturer
AN/ASQ-8	100 lb (45 kg) Magnetic Anomaly Detector (MAD) anti-submarine warfare detection set with fluxgate magnetometer produced paper charts of anomalies	P-2 Neptune, P-5 Marlin, S-2 Tracker	General Instrument, Dalmo-Victor, Geophysical Service
AN/ASQ-10	About 30 lb (14 kg) servo-stabilized Magnetic detecting (fluxgate magnetometer) set	P-3A Orion	Dubrow Electronic Industries
AN/ASQ-19	Miniaturized communication/navigation/identification suite	F-4D Phantom II	Rockwell Collins
AN/ASQ-38	Bombing/navigation and terrain computer system, uses AN/APN-89, replaced AN/ASQ-48, replaced by AN/AQS-176	B-52G/H Stratofortress	IBM, Raytheon
AN/ASQ-42	Bombing/navigation system	B-58 Hustler	
AN/ASQ-48	Bombing/navigation system, replaced AN/ASB-15, replaced by AN/ASQ-38	B-52 Stratofortress	
AN/ASQ-81	Magnetic Anomaly Detector (MAD) anti-submarine warfare detection set using a saturable-core magnetometer with a signal-to-noise ratio sensitivity improvement of 8-times over the AN/ASQ-10 effectively doubling detection range, used with RO-32 Strip Chart Recorder, forerunner of AN/ASQ-208	MH-60R Seahawk, P-3C Orion, S-3B Viking, SH-2F Seasprite, SH-2G Super Seasprite, SH-3H Sea King, SH-60B/F Seahawk	Lockheed Corp, Raytheon
AN/ASQ-91	Laser-guided bomb weapons release computer, used with AN/AJB-7	F-4 Phantom II	
AN/ASQ-114	Digital data computer anti-submarine warfare sensor data processor along with communications, navigation, and tactical armament status sources, forerunner of AN/ASQ-212	P-3C Orion	Lockheed Martin
AN/ASQ-119	Stellar navigation Astrotracker astrocompass	FB-111A Aardvark	Litton Industries
AN/ASQ-121	Solid-state onboard computer	A-6E Intruder	
AN/ASQ-133	Solid-state Evaluation, Analysis Recording System (EARS) or High Altitude Radiation Detection System (HARDS)	A-6 Intruder	IBM
AN/ASQ-145	Low Light Level Television (LLLTV)	AC-130H Spectre	
AN/ASQ-151	Airborne Electro-optical Viewing System (EVS) comprised AN/AAQ-6 paired with AN/AVQ-22	B-52G/H Stratofortress	Boeing
AN/ASQ-152	Pave Spike laser target designator pod	F-4D Phantom II	Westinghouse Electronic Systems
AN/ASQ-153	Pave Spike electro-optical laser designator targeting pod	F-4D Phantom II, F-4E Phantom II	Westinghouse Electronic Systems
AN/ASQ-155	Cockpit-mounted bombardier/navigator-operated bombing/weapon release computer	A-6E Intruder	IBM
AN/ASQ-170	549.4 lb (249.2 kg) Target Acquisition Designation Sight portion of TADS/PNVS low light level television (LLLTV) weapon director, used with AN/AAQ-11, replaced by Apache Arrowhead system	AH-64D Apache	Honeywell Aerospace, Lockheed Martin, Northrop Grumman, Raytheon
AN/ASQ-184	Avionics management system, integrated with AN/ALQ-161 and AN/ALE-49	B-1B Lancer	
AN/ASQ-208	Digital Magnetic Anomaly Detector (MAD) anti-submarine warfare detection set, developed from AN/ASQ-81	MH-60R Seahawk, P-3C Orion, S-3B Viking, SH-2F Seasprite, SH-2G Super Seasprite, SH-3H Sea King, SH-60B/F Seahawk	Raytheon
AN/ASQ-212	Digital data computer anti-submarine warfare sensor data processor along with communications, navigation, and tactical armament status sources, upgraded AN/ASQ-114 with a Motorola 68030 microprocessor providing a processing speed increase of 30x	P-3C Orion	Lockheed Martin
AN/ASQ-213	90 lb (41 kg) Smart Targeting and Identification via Networked Geolocation (STING) AGM-88 HARM (High-speed Anti-Radiation Missile) targeting pod operating from 0.5–20 GHz (59.96–1.50 cm) providing autonomous detection, identification, and location of radar-guided threats at long ranges	F-16 Fighting Falcon	Texas Instruments, Raytheon
AN/ASQ-228	Multi-sensor, electro-optical Advanced Targeting Forward-Looking Infrared (ATFLIR) pod, replaced AN/AAR-50 and AN/AAS-38	F/A-18C/D Hornet, F/A-18E/F Super Hornet	Raytheon
AN/ASQ-235	Archerfish expendable Airborne Mine Neutralization System (AMNS) (Note: In a single reliable reference source used for this entry, instead of listing the Archerfish AMNS system as AN/ASQ-235, it shows numerous times within the document as AN/AQS-235. But on page 36, section 3, the title refers to the AN/AQS-235 and the next sentence calls it AN/ASQ-235. Considering how many other references (including the Navy factsheet) call it AN/ASQ-235, that is what was used in this Wikipedia list.) with up to four destructors to acquire, identify, and defeat (neutralize) naval un-buried bottom and moored sea mines, paired with AN/AES-1, part of Mine Countermeasures Mission Package	Freedom-class littoral combat ships, Independence-class littoral combat ships, MH-60S Knighthawk	Raytheon
AN/ASQ-236	Dragon's Eye 1,001 lb (454 kg) high resolution advanced active electronically scanned array synthetic-aperture radar pod	F-15E Strike Eagle, B-52 Stratofortress	Northrop Grumman
AN/ASQ-239	Barracuda 185 lb (84 kg) integrated 360° electronic warfare (EW) suite electronic and infrared countermeasures system with long-range threat warning, self-protection, and targeting support	F-35 Lightning II	BAE
AN/ASQ-504	52.5 lb (23.8 kg) Advanced Integrated MAD (magnetic anomaly detection) System (AIMS) anti-submarine warfare set with an optically pumped caesium detection head with a detection range of 3,000 ft (910 m), replaced by AN/ASQ-508	P-3C Orion, P-8A Poseidon, SH-2 Seasprite, SH-60 Seahawk	CAE Inc.

AN/ASW – Airborne Special/Combination Flight/Remote Control Equipment
Designation	Purpose/Description	Location/Used By	Manufacturer
AN/ASW-25	Data link system	F-4J Phantom II,	
AN/ASW-27	Link 4 two-way data link system	F-14 Tomcat	Harris Corp
AN/ASW-28	One-way data link Airborne Launch Control Center System used with automatic carrier landing systems	F-4J Phantom II	

AN/ASX – Airborne Special/Combination Identification/Recognition Systems
Designation	Purpose/Description	Location/Used By	Manufacturer
AN/ASX-1	Target Identification System Electro-Optical (TISEO)	F-4E Phantom II, F-15 Eagle	Northrop Grumman

=== AVx – Piloted Aircraft Visual/Visible Light Systems ===
AN/AVA – Airborne Visual Auxiliary Systems
Designation	Purpose/Description	Location/Used By	Manufacturer
AN/AVA-12	Vertical and horizontal situation display, communications and direction-finders embedded in the AN/AWG-9 radar display	F-14 Tomcat	

AN/AVG – Airborne Visual Fire-Control Systems
Designation	Purpose/Description	Location/Used By	Manufacturer
AN/AVG-12 HUD		F-14 Tomcat	Kaiser

AN/AVQ – Airborne Visual/Visible Light Special/Combination Systems
Designation	Purpose/Description	Location/Used By	Manufacturer
AN/AVQ-9	Pave Light stabilized laser designator	F-4D Phantom II	
AN/AVQ-10	Pave Knife precision targeting pod, replaced by Pave Spike and Pave Tack systems	A-6 Intruder, F-4 Phantom II	Ford Aerospace
AN/AVQ-11	Pave Sword laser tracker/receiver pod	F-4 Phantom II	
AN/AVQ-12	Pave Spot stabilized periscopic night vision sight with laser designator targeting pod	F-4 Phantom II, F-111 Aardvark, O-2A Skymaster	Varo
AN/AVQ-13	Pave Nail stabilized periscopic night sight/laser designator	OV-10 Bronco	
AN/AVQ-14	Pave Arrow laser tracker pod used in conjunction with the Pave Spot laser designator	C-123 Provider, O-2A Skymaster	
AN/AVQ-22	Low Light Level Television (LLLTV) or Steerable TV (STV), paired with AN/AAQ-6 to form the AN/ASQ-151	B-52G/H Stratofortress	Westinghouse Electric
AN/AVQ-23	Pave Spike pylon-mounted electro-optical laser targeting pod, replaced AN/AVQ-10	F-4D Phantom II, F-4E Phantom II	
AN/AVQ-26	Pave Tack electro-optical targeting pod, nicknamed Pave Drag, uses AN/AAQ-9, replaced AN/AVQ-10	F-4 Phantom II, F-111C Pig, F-111F Aardvark	Ford Aerospace
AN/AVQ-29	Pave Tack laser designator and rangefinder	F-4 Phantom II, F-111C Pig, F-111F Aardvark	Ford Aerospace

AN/AVR – Airborne Visual/Visible Receiver/Passive Detection Systems
Designation	Purpose/Description	Location/Used By	Manufacturer
AN/AVR-2	Passive laser warning receiver	AH-1F Cobra, AH-64A Apache, AH-64D Apache, EH-60A Black Hawk, MH-47E Chinook, MH-60K Black Hawk, OH-58D Kiowa	Hughes Aircraft

AN/AVS – Airborne Visual/Visible Light Detection/Range and Bearing Search Systems
Designation	Purpose/Description	Location/Used By	Manufacturer
AN/AVS-6	Dual tube helmet mounted 1.3 lb (0.59 kg) battery operated third-generation Aviator Night Vision Imaging System (ANVIS) allows flight operations in very low ambient light conditions, adapted from AN/PVS-5		
AN/AVS-10	Panoramic Night Vision Goggles (PNVG), also Aviator Night Vision Imaging System (ANVIS) 10 with a total 97º field of view, precursor to the GPNVG-18		Kollsman

=== AWx – Piloted Aircraft Armament Systems ===
AN/AWG – Airborne Armament Fire-control Systems
Designation	Purpose/Description	Location/Used By	Manufacturer
AN/AWG-9	All-weather, multi-mode X-band pulse-Doppler radar and Fire Control System (FCS)	F-14 Tomcat	Hughes Aircraft
AN/AWG-10	Pulse Doppler Fire Control System, paired with AN/APG-59 FCR	F-4J Phantom II, F-4S Phantom II, F-4X Phantom II	Westinghouse Electronic Systems
AN/AWG-11	Pulse Doppler Fire Control System, paired with AN/APG-60 FCR	F-4K Phantom II	Ferranti
AN/AWG-12	Pulse Doppler Fire Control System, paired with AN/APG-61 FCR	F-4M Phantom II	Ferranti
AN/AWG-14	Fully Digital AN/AWG-10 Pulse Doppler Fire Control System, paired with AN/APQ-120		Westinghouse Electronic Systems
AN/AWG-15	Fire Control System	F-14 Tomcat	
AN/AWG-20	Armament Control System, paired with AN/APG-63 radar family, forerunner of AN/AWG-27	F-15C/D Eagle	Hughes Aircraft
AN/AWG-21	Fire Control System for AGM-78 Standard ARM (anti-radiation missile) system	A-6B/E Intruder	Naval Air Warfare Center, Indianapolis
AN/AWG-27	Programmable Armament Control System, paired with AN/APG-63 radar family, developed from AN/AWG-20	F-15E Strike Eagle	Hughes Aircraft

=== AXx – Piloted Aircraft Facsimile/Television Systems ===
AN/AXR – Airborne Facsimile/Television Receiver Systems
Designation	Purpose/Description	Location/Used By	Manufacturer
AN/AXR-1	Aircraft television receiver, works with AN/AXT-2		Farnsworth Radio & Television, RCA Corp

AN/AXT – Airborne Facsimile/Television Transmitter Systems
Designation	Purpose/Description	Location/Used By	Manufacturer
AN/AXT-2	15 watt 110 lb (50 kg) aircraft observation/telemetry television UHF transmitter operating between 264–372 MHz (1.14–0.81 m) in 10 channels with a range of about 30 mi (48 km)	GB-4 glide bomb, JB-4 (MX-607) air-to-surface missile, YP-59 Airacomet	Farnsworth Radio & Television, RCA Corp

AN/AXX – Airborne Facsimile/Television Identification/Recognition Systems
Designation	Purpose/Description	Location/Used By	Manufacturer
AN/AXX-1	Television Camera Set (TCS) for long-range target identification out to 60 mi (52 nmi; 97 km), replaced AN/ALR-23	F-14 Tomcat	Northrop Corp

=== AYx – Piloted Aircraft Data Processing/Computer Systems ===
AN/AYK – Airborne Data Processing/Computer Systems
Designation	Purpose/Description	Location/Used By	Manufacturer
AN/AYK-2	23.6 lb (10.7 kg) airborne navigation computer	SH-2F Seasprite,	
AN/AYK-6	Weapons system computer, used with AN/AJN-16	A-6 Intruder, F-111 Aardvark	IBM
AN/AYK-8	Millicomputer mission systems computer	B-57G Canberra, E-3 Sentry	Westinghouse Electronic Systems
AN/AYK-14	16-bit general-purpose weapons systems computer	AV-8B Harrier II Plus, E-2C Hawkeye, EA-6B Prowler, EP-3E Aries, F-4J Phantom II, F-14 Tomcat, F-18 Hornet, P-3C Orion	Control Data Corp
AN/AYK-15	Digital Avionics Information System (DAIS) 16-bit multimission computer		
AN/AYK-22	Armament control/processor external stores management PowerPC-based computer	EA-18G Growler, F/A-18C/D Hornet, F/A-18E/F Super Hornet	

AN/:
- Top
- A
- B
- C
- D
- F
- G
- M–Z
- See also
- Notes
- References
- Bibliography
- Further reading
- External links
- Main list

== B ==
=== BLx – Submarine Countermeasures Systems ===
AN/BLQ – Submarine Countermeasures Special/Combination Equipment
Designation	Purpose/Description	Submarine Class	Manufacturer
AN/BLQ-10	Submarine based signals intelligence (SIGINT) threat warning/reconnaissance system for radar and communications intelligence, part of the Electronic Support (ES) suite	Columbia-class submarines (future), Los Angeles-class submarines, Ohio-class submarines, Seawolf-class submarines, Virginia-class submarines	Lockheed Martin
AN/BLQ-11	Long-Term Mine Reconnaissance System (LMRS) autonomous unmanned undersea vehicle (UUV) torpedo tube-launched and tube-recovered for underwater search and survey	Los Angeles-class submarines, Seawolf-class submarines, Virginia-class submarines	Boeing Defense, Space & Security

AN/BLR – Submarine Countermeasures Receiver Systems
Designation	Purpose/Description	Location/Used By	Manufacturer
AN/BLR-14	Submarine acoustic warfare system (SAWS) sonar warning receiver with integrated receiver, processor, display and countermeasures launch control	US Navy	Sperry Corp
AN/BLR-15	Passive electronic support measures (ESM) radar warning receiver	US Navy	

=== BPx – Submarine Radar Systems ===
AN/BPS – Submarine Radar Detection/Range and Bearing Search Systems
Designation	Purpose/Description	Submarine Class	Manufacturer
AN/BPS-15	1,772 lb (804 kg) low power 35 kW X-band Automatic Radar Plotting Aid (ARPA) navigation and surface search radar operating from 8.795–8.855 GHz (3.41–3.39 cm)	Los Angeles-class submarines, Ohio-class submarines, Virginia-class submarines	Electromechanical Systems
AN/BPS-16	2,890.4 lb (1,311.1 kg) low power 35 kW X-band Automatic Radar Plotting Aid (ARPA) navigation and surface search radar operating from 8.795–8.855 GHz (3.41–3.39 cm), improved AN/BPS-15, includes the Voyage Management System (VMS) with Electronic Chart Display and Information System (ECDIS-N)	Ohio-class submarines, Seawolf-class submarines, Virginia-class submarines	Northrop Grumman

=== BQx – Submarine Sonar Systems ===
AN/BQH – Submarine Sonar Recording Systems
Designation	Purpose/Description	Submarine Class	Manufacturer
AN/BQH-1	Submarine transistorized depth speed of sound measuring set (velocimeter)		Dyna-Empire Corp
AN/BQH-7	Submarine-launched expendable hydrographic Measurement and Signature Intelligence (MASINT) bathythermograph to measure/record water temperature for acoustic propagation analysis, (Note: AN/BQH-7A was a surface ship version of the same bathythermograph) replaced AN/SSQ-61		Sippican Corp
AN/BQH-71	Surface ship-launched expendable hydrographic Measurement and Signature Intelligence (MASINT) bathythermograph to measure/record water temperature for acoustic propagation analysis		

AN/BQQ – Submarine Sonar Special/Combination Systems
Designation	Purpose/Description	Submarine Class	Manufacturer
AN/BQQ-5	Bow-mounted spherical active/passive sonar with low frequency active interference rejection, dual towed array processing, and full spectrum processing, consists of AN/BQS-13 spherical sonar array and AN/UYK-44 computer, replaced by AN/BQQ-10	Los Angeles-class submarines, Ohio-class submarines	IBM
AN/BQQ-6	Hull-mounted, long-range passive passive sonar, developed from AN/BQQ-5	Ohio-class submarines	Lockheed Martin, Vitro Corp, Southwest Marine
AN/BQQ-10	Towed and hull array active/passive sonar, replaced AN/BQQ-5 and AN/BBQ-6	Virginia-class submarines Ohio-class submarines	Lockheed Martin

AN/BQR – Submarine Sonar Receiver/Passive Detection Systems
Designation	Purpose/Description	Submarine Class	Manufacturer
AN/BQR-2	Passive sonar	Skipjack-class submarines	
AN/BQR-12	Active sonar	Skipjack-class submarines	
AN/BQR-15	Signal Processing and Display (SPAD) thin line towed array, cable 2,640 ft (800 m) in length	Lafayette-class submarines, Ohio-class submarines	Western Electric
AN/BQR-19	Mast mounted HF active sonar for surfacing	Ohio-class submarines	Raytheon

AN/BQS – Submarine Sonar Detection/Range and Bearing Search Systems
Designation	Purpose/Description	Submarine Class	Manufacturer
AN/BQS-4	Active/passive sonar	Skipjack-class submarines	
AN/BQS-13	Bow mounted hydrophone array sonar, part of AN/BQQ-5	Ohio-class submarines	Raytheon
AN/BQS-15	Sail mounted close contact active/passive sonar	Los Angeles-class submarines, Ohio-class submarines	Ametek

=== BRx – Submarine Radio Systems ===
AN/BRD – Submarine Radio Direction Finding/Reconnaissance/Surveillance Systems
Designation	Purpose/Description	Location/Used By	Manufacturer
AN/BRD-6	Radio direction finder and signals intelligence (SIGINT) receiver, replaced by AN/BRD-7		Sanders Associates
AN/BRD-7	Radio direction finder and signals intelligence (SIGINT) receiver, replaced AN/BRD-6	Los Angeles-class submarines, Sturgeon-class submarines, USS Gurnard (SSN-662)	Sanders Associates

=== BSx – Submarine Special/Combination Systems ===
AN/BSY – Submarine Special/Combination Surveillance and Control Systems
Designation	Purpose/Description	Submarine Class	Manufacturer
AN/BSY-1	Submarine Advanced Combat System (SUBACS)	Los Angeles-class submarines	IBM
AN/BSY-2	Submarine Advanced Combat System (SUBACS)	Seawolf-class submarines	

=== BYx – Submarine Data Processing/Computer Systems ===
AN/BYG – Submarine Data Processing/Computer Fire-Control Systems
Designation	Purpose/Description	Location/Used By	Manufacturer
AN/BYG-1	Submarine combat control system	Columbia-class submarines, Los Angeles-class submarines, Ohio-class submarines, Seawolf-class submarines, Virginia-class submarines	General Dynamics Mission Systems

AN/:
- Top
- A
- B
- C
- D
- F
- G
- M–Z
- See also
- Notes
- References
- Bibliography
- Further reading
- External links
- Main list

== C ==
=== CPx – Cryptographic (previously Air Transportable or Cargo) Radar Systems ===
AN/CPN – Air Transportable Radar Navigation Systems
Designation	Purpose/Description	Sites/Users	Manufacturer
AN/CPN-1	Transportable S-band radar beacon		
AN/CPN-2	Short range 30 kW transponder blind bombing aid operating from 290–330 MHz (1.03–0.91 m)		RCA Corp
AN/CPN-3	Transportable S-band radar beacon operating at 3.256 GHz (9.21 cm) with a range of about 150 mi (240 km)	Ship- or land-based	
AN/CPN-4	Transportable combined search and precision approach radar (PAR). Search mode transmits with 600 kW power at 2.78–2.82 GHz (10.78–10.63 cm) with a range of about 36 nmi (41 mi; 67 km) reaching 10,000 ft (3,000 m) while PAR mode operates between 9–9.16 GHz (3.33–3.27 cm) out to about 8 mi (13 km)		Raytheon, ITT-Gilfillan
AN/CPN-6	Minnie 40 kW X-band radar beacon operating at 9.31 GHz (3.22 cm) with a 100 mi (160 km) range, used with AN/APS-10	Ship- or land-based	Galvin Manufacturing Corp
AN/CPN-7	Beam Approach Beacon System (BABS)		
AN/CPN-8	S-band homing beacon (BPS), used with AN/MPN-2		
AN/CPN-11	Transportable master/slave Long Range Navigation (LORAN) beacon in combination with AN/CPN-12, used with aircraft systems AN/APN-4 or AN/APN-9		
AN/CPN-12	Transportable master/slave Long Range Navigation (LORAN) beacon in combination with AN/CPN-11, used with aircraft systems AN/APN-4 or AN/APN-9		
AN/CPN-17	S-band transportable Identification Friend or Foe (IFF) beacon		Galvin Manufacturing Corp
AN/CPN-18	500 kW S-band transportable airport surveillance radar portion of an Air Traffic Control system operating from 2.7–2.9 GHz (11.10–10.34 cm) with a range of up to 70 nmi (81 mi; 130 km)		

AN/CPS – Air Transportable Radar Detection/Range and Bearing Search Systems
Designation	Purpose/Description	Sites/Users	Manufacturer
AN/CPS-1	Heavyweight semi-mobile Microwave Early Warning (MEW) S-band long range and high angle radar operating at 3.2 GHz (9.37 cm) out to a range of 200 mi (320 km), developed as Project 422A, Camp Evans Signal Laboratory		General Electric
AN/CPS-2	Early warning medium-range radar, developed as Project 424B, Camp Evans Signal Laboratory		Federal Telephone and Radio Corp
AN/CPS-3	Transportable search radar, developed as Project 421, Camp Evans Signal Laboratory		
AN/CPS-4	Beaver Tail (or Big Weapon or Big Beaver) transportable S-band medium-range height-finding radar operating from 2.7–2.9 GHz (11.10–10.34 cm) at a distance of up to 90 mi (140 km)	Lashup Radar Network	MIT Radiation Laboratory
AN/CPS-5	Transportable medium weight 750 kW Ground-Controlled Interception (GCI) and early warning radar operating at 1.3 GHz (23.06 cm) to more than 70 mi (110 km) (often as much as 210 mi (340 km)) and up to 40,000 ft (12,000 m) altitude	Lashup Radar Network	General Electric, Bendix Corp
AN/CPS-6	Minnie S-band 1 megawatt search and Ground-Controlled Interception (GCI) radar operating from 2.7–3.01 GHz (11.10–9.96 cm) with a range of up to 240 mi (390 km)	Lashup Radar Network	General Electric
AN/CPS-9	250 kW X-band meteorological radar with a range of 250 mi (400 km) operating from 9.23–9.404 GHz (3.25–3.19 cm)	Air Weather Service (now Air Force Weather Agency)	Raytheon

=== CRx – Cryptographic Radio Systems (Note: Before AN/CRC designated Cryptographic Radios, the first "C" meant "Air Transportable" (ie. Cargo)) ===
AN/CRC – Cryptographical Radio Communication Systems
Designation	Purpose/Description	Sites/Users	Manufacturer
AN/CRC-7	World War II era survival radio operating at 140.58 MHz (2.13 m)		

AN/CRN – Cryptographical Radio Navigational Aid Systems
Designation	Purpose/Description	Sites/Users	Manufacturer
AN/CRN-1	Low-frequency parachute navigation/homing buoy radio beacon		
AN/CRN-2	25 watt trailer mounted instrument landing glide path CW UHF transmitter operating from 329–335 MHz (0.91–0.89 m) at 15 mi (24 km) range using a 30 ft (9.1 m) mast antenna, used with AN/ARN-5	USAAF	
AN/CRN-3	Air transportable 25 watt instrument landing system localizer azimuth transmitter for centerline operating from 108.3–110.3 MHz (2.77–2.72 m), same as AN/MRN-1		

AN/CRT – Air Transportable Radio Transmitter Systems
Designation	Purpose/Description	Sites/Users	Manufacturer
AN/CRT-1	Passive omnidirectional broadband sonobuoy		
AN/CRT-4	Second military sonobuoy		

=== CSx – Cryptographic Special/Combination Systems ===
AN/CSZ – Cryptographic Special/Combination Secure Systems
Designation	Purpose/Description	Sites/Users	Manufacturer
AN/CSZ-9	Hardware random number generator	NSA	

=== CYx – Cryptographic Data Processing/Computer Equipment ===
AN/CYZ – Cryptographic Data Processing/Computer Secure Systems
Designation	Purpose/Description	Sites/Users	Manufacturer
AN/CYZ-10	Data Transfer Device (DTD) for variable length electronic keying material		AlliedSignal

AN/:
- Top
- A
- B
- C
- D
- F
- G
- M–Z
- See also
- Notes
- References
- Bibliography
- Further reading
- External links
- Main list

== D ==
=== DAx – Pilotless Carrier Infrared Systems ===
AN/DAS – Pilotless Carrier Infrared Detection/Range and Bearing Search Systems
Designation	Purpose/Description	Location/Used By	Manufacturer
AN/DAS-1	Multi-spectral Targeting system (MTS-B) EO/IR laser target designator and intelligence, surveillance and reconnaissance (ISR) sensor	MQ-9 Reaper	Raytheon
AN/DAS-2	Common Sensor Payload (CSP) multi-spectral targeting system	MQ-1C Gray Eagle	Raytheon
AN/DAS-4	Next-generation multi-spectral targeting system	RQ-9 Reaper	Raytheon

AN/DAW – Pilotless Carrier Infrared Automatic Flight/Remote Control Systems
Designation	Purpose/Description	Location/Used By	Manufacturer
AN/DAW-1	Improved all-aspect dual-mode mid-range (3–5 μm) infrared homing guidance section	MIM-72C Chaparral	Ford Aeronutronic
AN/DAW-2	Rosette scanning infrared homing guidance section	MIM-72G Chaparral	Ford Aerospace

=== DRx – Pilotless Carrier Radio Systems ===
AN/DRC – Pilotless Carrier Radio Communications Systems
Designation	Purpose/Description	Missile/Drone	Manufacturer
AN/DRC-8	Emergency Rocket Communications System (ERCS)	Intercontinental ballistic missile (ICBM)	Boeing

AN/:
- Top
- A
- B
- C
- D
- F
- G
- M–Z
- See also
- Notes
- References
- Bibliography
- Further reading
- External links
- Main list

== F ==
=== FGx – Fixed Telegraph/Teletype Systems ===
AN/FGC – Fixed Telegraph/Teletype Communications
Designation	Purpose/Description	Sites/Users	Manufacturer
AN/FGC-59	Teletype		Teletype Corp

=== FLx – Fixed Countermeasures Systems ===
AN/FLR – Fixed Countermeasures Receiver/Passive Detection Systems
Designation	Purpose/Description	Location/Used By	Manufacturer
AN/FLR-9	Iron Horse network High Frequency Direction Finding (HF/DF) antenna array, nickname Elephant Cage		GTE-Sylvania

=== FMx – Fixed Meteorological Systems ===
AN/FMQ – Fixed Meteorological Special/Combination Systems
Designation	Purpose/Description	Location/Used By	Manufacturer
AN/FMQ-19	Automated Weather Observing System (AWOS)		Mesotech International
AN/FMQ-22	Automated Weather Observing System (AWOS)		Mesotech International
AN/FMQ-23	Automated Weather Observing System (AWOS)		Mesotech International

=== FPx – Fixed Radar Systems ===
AN/FPA – Fixed Radar Auxiliary Assembly Systems
Designation	Purpose/Description	Location/Used By	Manufacturer
AN/FPA-21	Radar central computer	Ballistic Missile Early Warning System, Pituffik Space Base, Site III	

AN/FPQ – Fixed Radar Special/Combination Systems
Designation	Purpose/Description	Location/Used By	Manufacturer
AN/FPQ-4	C/L-band and UHF radars for the Downrange Anti-missile Measurement Program (DAMP Project), uses AN/FPW-2	USAS American Mariner	
AN/FPQ-6	Land-based C-band radar system used for long-range, small-target tracking	NASA Kennedy Space Center	RCA Corp
AN/FPQ-16	Perimeter Acquisition Radar Attack Characterization System (PARCS) passive electronically scanned array	US Army Safeguard Program	General Electric

AN/FPS – Fixed Radar Detection/Range and Bearing Search Systems
Designation	Purpose/Description	Location/Used By	Manufacturer
AN/FPS-3	L-band early-warning and Ground-Controlled Interception (GCI) radar		Bendix Corp
AN/FPS-4	Height-finder radar		Zenith Electronics, RCA Corp
AN/FPS-5	Nodding height-finder radar		Hazeltine Corp
AN/FPS-6	Height-finder radar, fixed version of AN/MPS-14		Hazeltine Corp
AN/FPS-7	L-band long range stacked-beam air defense and air traffic control search radar		General Electric
AN/FPS-8	L-band medium-range aircraft control and early warning search radar		General Electric
AN/FPS-10	Fixed search radar, stripped-down version of AN/CPS-6B	Lashup Radar Network	General Electric
AN/FPS-12	Surveillance radar supporting Downrange Anti-missile Measurement Program (DAMP)	USAS American Mariner	
AN/FPS-14	S-band medium-range low-altitude search Radar		Bendix Corp
AN/FPS-16	1 MW ground-based monopulse single object tracking radar (SOTR) operating from 5.45–5.825 GHz (5.50–5.15 cm) with a range of 230 mi (200 nmi; 370 km)	NASA, US Air Force, US Army	Naval Research Laboratory
AN/FPS-17	Ground-based fixed-beam detection radar		General Electric
AN/FPS-18	Medium-range S-band gap-filler search radar operating between 2.7–2.9 GHz (11.10–10.34 cm) with a range of 65 mi (105 km)	Semi-Automatic Ground Environment (SAGE)	Bendix Corp
AN/FPS-19	L-band long-range search radar	North American Aerospace Defense Command (NORAD)	Raytheon
AN/FPS-20	L-band early warning and Ground-Controlled Interception (GCI) radar, forerunner of several radar systems		Bendix Corp
AN/FPS-23	Fluttar short-range early-warning radar	Distant Early Warning Line (DEW Line)	Motorola
AN/FPS-24	Two-frequency VHF long range early warning radar		General Electric
AN/FPS-26	Frequency diverse height finder radar	Semi-Automatic Ground Environment (SAGE) radar stations	Avco
AN/FPS-27	S-band frequency diverse search radar		Westinghouse Electronic Systems
AN/FPS-30	Long range early warning radar	Distant Early Warning Line (DEW Line)	
AN/FPS-35	Frequency diverse long range air defense search radar		Sperry Corp
AN/FPS-41	S-band weather radar operating at a frequency of 2.9 GHz (10.34 cm) with a maximum range of 494 nmi (568 mi; 915 km), also called WSR-57		
AN/FPS-49	Five-horn monopulse tracker radar, forerunner of AN/FPS-92	Ballistic Missile Early Warning System (BMEWS)	RCA Corp
AN/FPS-50	UHF radar with an Organ-pipe scanner	Ballistic Missile Early Warning System (BMEWS)	General Electric
AN/FPS-64	Early-warning radar, upgraded version of the AN/FPS-20		
AN/FPS-65	L-band early warning and Ground-Controlled Interception (GCI) radar		Bendix Corp
AN/FPS-66	Early-warning radar, upgraded version of the AN/FPS-20		
AN/FPS-67	Early-warning radar, upgraded version of the AN/FPS-20		
AN/FPS-77	C-band medium-range storm detection radar		Lear Siegler
AN/FPS-82	Early-warning radar, upgraded version of the AN/FPS-20	Semi-Automatic Ground Environment (SAGE) radar stations	
AN/FPS-85	Phased array spacetrack radar	Eglin AFB Site C-6	Bendix Corp
AN/FPS-87	Early-warning radar, upgraded version of the AN/FPS-20, forerunner of AN/FPS-93	Semi-Automatic Ground Environment (SAGE) radar stations	
AN/FPS-90	S-band long range height finder radar		
AN/FPS-91	Early-warning radar, upgraded AN/FPS-20	Semi-Automatic Ground Environment (SAGE) radar stations	General Electric
AN/FPS-92	Radar set, upgraded version of the AN/FPS-49	Ballistic Missile Early Warning System, Clear Space Force Station	RCA Corp
AN/FPS-93	Upgraded from Canadian version of AN/FPS-87	Semi-Automatic Ground Environment (SAGE) radar stations	
AN/FPS-95	Cobra Mist ground-based over-the-horizon radar		
AN/FPS-100	L-band early warning and Ground-Controlled Interception (GCI) radar, modified AN/FPS-20 adding a digital Moving target indicator (MTI)	Semi-Automatic Ground Environment (SAGE) radar stations	Bendix Corp
AN/FPS-107	L-band long range search radar		Westinghouse Electronic Systems
AN/FPS-108	Cobra Dane is a passive electronically scanned array radar	Shemya island (now Eareckson Air Station)	Raytheon
AN/FPS-113	Early warning and Ground-Controlled Interception (GCI) radar		General Dynamics
AN/FPS-115	PAVE PAWS Phased Array Warning System early warning radar	United States Space Surveillance Network	Raytheon
AN/FPS-116	Long-range S-band height finding radar, upgraded version of the AN/FPS-6		General Electric
AN/FPS-117	L-band Active Electronically Scanned Array (AESA) air surveillance and theater ballistic missile (TBM) detection 3D radar, forerunner of AN/TPS-59 and AN/TPS-77		GE Aerospace
AN/FPS-118	Over-The-Horizon-Backscatter (OTH-B) radar		General Electric, Raytheon, Sylvania Electric
AN/FPS-120	PAVE PAWS Solid State Phased Array Radar System (SSPARS), replaced AN/FPS-50		Raytheon
AN/FPS-123	PAVE PAWS Solid State Phased Array Radar System (SSPARS)		Raytheon
AN/FPS-124	Short range doppler unattended radar (UAR)	North Warning System	
AN/FPS-126	PAVE PAWS Solid State Phased Array Radar System (SSPARS)		Raytheon
AN/FPS-129	HAVE STARE dual band (S-band/X-band) ground space tracking radar, also called Globus II		Raytheon
AN/FPS-130	65 kW long-range solid-state 3D L-band Air Route Surveillance Radar (also known as ARSR-4) operating from 1.215–1.4 GHz (24.7–21.4 cm) with a 250-nautical-mile (460 km; 290 mi) range	Joint Surveillance System	Northrop Grumman
AN/FPS-132	Upgraded Early Warning Radar (UEWR) Solid State Phased Array Radar System (SSPARS)		Raytheon
AN/FPS-133	Continuous Wave (CW) VHF multistatic radar operating around 216.98 MHz (1.38 m)	United States Space Surveillance Network	

AN/FPW – Fixed Radar Automatic/Remote Flight Systems
Designation	Purpose/Description	Location/Used By	Manufacturer
AN/FPW-2	RIM-8 Talos Guidance Pedestal for the Downrange Anti-missile Measurement Program (DAMP Project), slaved to AN/FPQ-4	USAS American Mariner	

=== FRx – Fixed Radio Systems ===
AN/FRD – Fixed Radio Direction Finding/Reconnaissance/Surveillance Systems
Designation	Purpose/Description	Location/Used By	Manufacturer
AN/FRD-10	Wullenweber circularly disposed antenna array (CDAA) high frequency direction finder (HF/DF)		Sylvania Electric, RCA Corp, Kenton Electric

AN/FRM – Fixed Radio Maintenance/Test Assembly Systems
Designation	Purpose/Description	Location/Used By	Manufacturer
AN/FRM-23	Communications Systems Analyzer		

=== FSx – Fixed Special/Combination Systems ===
AN/FSA – Fixed Special/Combination Auxiliary Assembly Systems
Designation	Purpose/Description	Location/Used By	Manufacturer
AN/FSA-12	Detector-Tracker Group, Data Processing and Display Subsystem	AN/GPA-73 Radar Course Directing Group	
AN/FSA-21	Weapons Control Group computer	AN/GPA-73 Radar Course Directing Group	
AN/FSA-23	Jammer Tracker Group	AN/GPA-73 Radar Course Directing Group	
AN/FSA-31	Radar Signal Processor	AN/GPA-73 Radar Course Directing Group	

AN/FSG – Fixed Special/Combination Fire Control Systems
Designation	Purpose/Description	Location/Used By	Manufacturer
AN/FSG-1	Anti-aircraft defense system, Project Nike, surface-to-air missile Command, control and coordination system (CCCS)	Missile Master installations	The Martin Company

AN/FSQ – Fixed Special/Combination Systems
Designation	Purpose/Description	Location/Used By	Manufacturer
AN/FSQ-7	Computerized air defense command and control system, Combat Direction Central	Semi-Automatic Ground Environment (SAGE)	IBM
AN/FSQ-8	Air defense command and control system; Combat Control Central		IBM
AN/FSQ-27	RW-400 real-time Data Processing Central computer		TRW
AN/FSQ-28	Missile Impact Predictor Set duplex, general purpose computer	Ballistic Missile Early Warning System, Pituffik Space Base, formerly known as Thule Air Base	Sylvania Electric
AN/FSQ-31	Command, control, and coordination system (CCCS)	Strategic Automated Command and Control System (SACCS)	IBM
AN/FSQ-32	Semi-Automatic Ground Environment (SAGE) solid state Computer		
AN/FSQ-53	Radar Monitoring Set, with console and Signal Data Converter Group	Ballistic Missile Early Warning System	Sylvania Electric
AN/FSQ-88	Lefox Purple Cold War-era fixed site communications intercept (COMINT) computer improving VHF/UHF voice intercept rocessing throughput time for collection, transcription and reporting capabilities, application of the Lefox Grey program.	Army Security Agency, INSCOM	

AN/FSS – Fixed Special Detection/Range and Bearing Search Systems
Designation	Purpose/Description	Location/Used By	Manufacturer
AN/FSS-7	SLBM detection radar with a range of about 750 nmi (1,390 km; 860 mi), modified AN/FPS-26, provides data to AN/GSQ-89	474N Submarine Launched Ballistic Missile Detection and Warning System (SLBMD&W System)	Avco

AN/FST – Fixed Special/Combination Transmitter Systems
Designation	Purpose/Description	Location/Used By	Manufacturer
AN/FST-2	Coordinate Data Transmitting Set (CDTS) computer system	416L Semi-Automatic Ground Environment (SAGE) radar stations	Burroughs Corp

=== FYx - Fixed Data Processing/Computer Systems ===
AN/FYA – Fixed Data Processing/Computer Auxiliary Assembly Systems
Designation	Purpose/Description	Location/Used By	Manufacturer
AN/FYA-2	Integrated data transfer console command, control, and coordination system	IBM 473L Command and Control System	

AN/FYQ – Fixed Data Processing/Computer Special/Combination Systems
Designation	Purpose/Description	Location/Used By	Manufacturer
AN/FYQ-9	Data processing and display for air defense command, control, and coordination system	Alaskan Air Command	
AN/FYQ-11	Data Processor set	IBM 473L Command and Control System, Did not enter service	Librascope
AN/FYQ-40	Radar video data processor		
AN/FYQ-93	Computer air defense command, control, and coordination system	Joint Surveillance System	Hughes Aircraft
AN/FYQ-155	Advanced Interface Control Unit (AICU)	US Air Force Battle Control System-Fixed (BCS-F)	

AN/:
- Top
- A
- B
- C
- D
- F
- G
- M–Z
- See also
- Notes
- References
- Bibliography
- Further reading
- External links
- Main list

== G ==
=== GKx – Ground Telemetering Systems ===
AN/GKA – Ground Telemetering Auxiliary Assembly Systems
Designation	Purpose/Description	Location/Used By	Manufacturer
AN/GKA-1	Flight Control Group	AN/GPA-37 Course Directing Group	General Electric
AN/GKA-10	Converter Group	AN/GPA-73 Radar Course Directing Group	RCA Corp
AN/GKA-11	Converter Group	AN/GPA-73 Radar Course Directing Group	RCA Corp
AN/GKA-12	Receiver Group	AN/GPA-73 Radar Course Directing Group	General Electric
AN/GKA-13	Monitor Transmitter Group	AN/GPA-73 Radar Course Directing Group	RCA Corp

=== GPx – Ground Radar Systems ===
AN/GPA – Ground Radar Auxiliary Assembly Systems
Designation	Purpose/Description	Location/Used By	Manufacturer
AN/GPA-23	Computing-Tracking Group	AN/GPA-37 Course Directing Group	General Electric
AN/GPA-27	L-band early-warning radar, upgraded AN/FPS-3		
AN/GPA-34	Converter Group for processing radar data	AN/GPA-37 Course Directing Group	General Electric
AN/GPA-35	Ground Environment, surface-to-air missile (SAM) weapons direction system	CIM-10 Bomarc	Westinghouse Electronic Systems
AN/GPA-37	Course Directing Group air defense command, control, and coordination system (CCCS)	Air Defense Command	General Electric
AN/GPA-67	Time Division Data Link	AN/GPA-37 Course Directing Group	General Electric
AN/GPA-73	Course Directing Group air defense command, control, and coordination system (CCCS)		General Electric

AN/GPG – Ground Radar Fire Control Systems
Designation	Purpose/Description	Location/Used By	Manufacturer
AN/GPG-1	Anti-aircraft tracker radar for 75-mm gun mount		Sperry Corp

AN/GPN – Ground Radar Navigational Aid Systems
Designation	Purpose/Description	Location/Used By	Manufacturer
AN/GPN-2	200 kW S-band short range airport surveillance radar operating between 2.869–2.9 GHz (10.45–10.34 cm) with a range of 35 mi (30 nmi; 56 km) up to 5,000 ft (1,500 m)	Military air traffic control	Bendix Corp
AN/GPN-6	500 kW S-band airport terminal area radar operating between 2.7–2.9 GHz (11.10–10.34 cm) with a range of 69 mi (60 nmi; 111 km)	Military air traffic control	Laboratory for Electronics
AN/GPN-12	425 kW S-band airport surveillance radar (also called ASR-7) operating from 2.7–2.9 GHz (11–10 cm) with a range of 69 mi (60 nmi; 111 km)	Military air traffic control	Texas Instruments
AN/GPN-20	1.4 MW S-band solid-state all-weather dual-channel airport surveillance radar operating from 2.7–2.9 GHz (11–10 cm) (also called ASR-8) with a range of 69 mi (60 nmi; 111 km)	Military air traffic control	Raytheon
AN/GPN-27	1.3 MW airport surveillance radar (also called ASR-9) operates between 2.7–2.9 GHz (11–10 cm) with a range of 58 mi (50 nmi; 93 km)	Military air traffic control	Northrop Grumman
AN/GPN-30	25 kW S-band Digital Airport Surveillance Radar (DASR) (also called ASR-11 in civilian use) operating between 2.7–2.9 GHz (11–10 cm) out to a ranges of 69 mi (60 nmi; 111 km) on the primary antenna and 140 mi (120 nmi; 230 km) secondary, replaced AN/GPN-12, AN/GPN-20 and AN/GPN-27	Military air traffic control	Raytheon

=== GRx – Ground Radio Systems ===
AN/GRA – Ground Radio Auxiliary Assembly Equipment
Designation	Purpose/Description	Location/Used By	Manufacturer
AN/GRA-6	HF Control Radio Set, replaced by AN/GRA-39	US Marine Corps	
AN/GRA-39	UHF/VHF radio control group, replaced AN/GRA-6	US Marine Corps	
AN/GRA-50	100 watt maximum half-wave dipole 75 ft 3 in (22.94 m) antenna group weighing 11.75 lb (5.33 kg) for both transmission and reception of RF signals between 1.5–20 MHz (200–15 m), used with AN/GRC-19		
AN/GRA-114	5 watt VHF radio data link, an artillery sound ranging system operating between 80–151 MHz (3.75–1.99 m), often with AN/TNS-10		Ferranti

AN/GRC – Ground Radio Communications Systems
Designation	Purpose/Description	Location/Used By	Manufacturer
AN/GRC-9	15 watt HF long range vacuum-tube radio operating between 2–12 MHz (149.90–24.98 m) in CW, MCW and AM modes, replaced Signal Corps Radio SCR-694, replaced by AN/PRC-62		
AN/GRC-46	Vehicle mounted 60 words per minute (45.5 Baud) half duplex radioteletype (or Radio Automatic Teletypewriter - RATT) set weighing 1,200 lb (540 kg) transmitting between 1.5–20 MHz (199.86–14.99 m) at 100 watts and receiving between 0.5–32 MHz (599.58–9.37 m), replaced by AN/GRC-142	US Army	
AN/GRC-103	Lightweight long range solid-state FM UHF tactical line-of-sight radio relay operating between 220–1,850 MHz (1.36–0.16 m) over 5 frequency bands with a range of up to 120 mi (190 km)		Canadian Marconi Company, Magnavox
AN/GRC-106	200 watt 120 lb (54 kg) two-way HF AM continuous wave (CW) upper side band radio with frequency-shift keying (FSK) operating from 2–30 MHz (149.90–9.99 m) having a 3.2 kHz bandwidth, used with AN/UGC-74 teletype, replaced AN/GRC-19		General Dynamics, Tadiran
AN/GRC-109	HF radio transmitter/receiver/power-supply	Special Forces, Central Intelligence Agency	Admiral Corp
AN/GRC-112	UHF radio	US Marine Corps	
AN/GRC-142	Vehicle mounted half duplex radioteletype (or Radio Automatic Teletypewriter - RATT) operating between 2–29.99 MHz (149.90–10.00 m), replaced AN/GRC-46, used with AN/UGC-74 teletype	US Army	
AN/GRC-160	Vehicular mounted VHF radio	US Marine Corps	
AN/GRC-171	UHF radio set operating between 225–399.975 MHz (1.33–0.75 m)	Marine Air Command and Control System (MACCS) agency	Rockwell Collins
AN/GRC-193	Half duplex HF tactical communications radio set operating between 2–29.99 MHz (149.90–10.00 m)	US Marine Corps	Harris Corp
AN/GRC-201	Multi-channel digital radio, modified version of AN/TRC-97	US Marine Corps	
AN/GRC-213	Lightweight HF 20-watt radio set operating between 2–29.99 MHz (149.90–10.00 m)	US Marine Corps	
AN/GRC-231	Tactical 125-watt radio set operating between 1.6–30 MHz (187.37–9.99 m)	US Marine Corps	Harris Corp
AN/GRC-239	Lightweight full duplex FM microwave line-of-sight Tropo/Satellite Support Radio (TSSR) system	US Marine Corps	Microwave Radio Communications

AN/GRD – Ground Radio Direction Finding/Reconnaissance/Surveillance Systems
Designation	Purpose/Description	Location/Used By	Manufacturer
AN/GRD-6	Direction finder		Sylvania Electric

AN/GRQ – Ground Radio Special/Combination Systems
Designation	Purpose/Description	Location/Used By	Manufacturer
AN/GRQ-16	Radio repeater	US Marine Corps	
AN/GRQ-21	Radio repeater	US Marine Corps	
AN/GRQ-26	Remote sensor, audio relay VHF repeater operating in 2 bands, 162–165 MHz (1.85–1.82 m) and 171–174 MHz (1.75–1.72 m)	US Marine Corps	
AN/GRQ-32	Sensor communications relay radio repeater set	US Marine Corps	Nova Manufacturing

=== GSx – Ground Special/Combination Systems ===
AN/GSA – Ground Special/Combination Auxiliary Assembly Systems
Designation	Purpose/Description	Location/Used By	Manufacturer
AN/GSA-51	Radar Course Directing Group air defense command, control, and coordination system (CCCS)	Semi-Automatic Ground Environment (SAGE)	Burroughs Corp

AN/GSC – Ground Special/Combination Communications Systems
Designation	Purpose/Description	Location/Used By	Manufacturer
AN/GSC-54	Fiber optic converter set, used with the Fiber Optic Cable System (FOCS), provides an optical communication link for up to 3.7 mi (6 km) in length	US Marine Corps	
AN/GSC-68	Mounted-Data Communications Terminal (M-DACT)	Marine Air Ground Task Force Command, Control, Communications, Computers, and Intelligence (MAGTF C^{4}I)	Tadiran, Raytheon

AN/GSG – Ground Special/Combination Fire Control Systems
Designation	Purpose/Description	Location/Used By	Manufacturer
AN/GSG-5	Battery Integration and Radar DIsplay Equipment (BIRDIE)	Project Nike Command, control and coordination system (CCCS)	The Martin Company
AN/GSG-6	Battery Integration and Radar DIsplay Equipment (BIRDIE)	Project Nike Command, control and coordination system (CCCS)	The Martin Company
AN/GSG-10	TACFIRE Gun data computer automates selected field artillery command and control functions, used with AN/PSG-2		

AN/GSQ – Ground Special/Combination Systems
Designation	Purpose/Description	Location/Used By	Manufacturer
AN/GSQ-16	Automatic Language Translator system	US Air Force	IBM
AN/GSQ-33	Transistorized ground guidance computer MOD1	SM-65 Atlas Intercontinental Ballistic Missile (ICBM) defense system	Burroughs Corp
AN/GSQ-89	Submarine Launched Ballistic Missile Detection and Warning System (SLBMD&W System) synthesized flight tracks from radar returns taking input data from AN/FSS-7 radars		
AN/GSQ-160	Electromagnetic Intrusion Detector (EMID) can detect moving personnel through walls operating at 57.6–60 MHz (5.20–5.00 m)		
AN/GSQ-187	Passive acoustic Improved Remote Battlefield Sensor System (I-REMBASS) uses monitored magnetometer, seismometer infrared, and acoustic sensors placed on likely enemy avenues of approach to detect vehicles (16–273 yd (15–250 m)), tracked vehicles (27–383 yd (25–350 m)) and personnel (3.3–54.7 yd (3–50 m)	US Army	
AN/GSQ-235	Region Operations Control Center/Airborne Warning And Control Systems (ROCC/AWACS) Digital Information Link (RADIL), co-located with AN/FYQ-93, uses AN/USQ-76	Joint Surveillance System	
AN/GSQ-257	VHF Unattended Ground Sensor Set (UGSS) suite of sensors detecting vehicle and personnel movement, referred to as Tactical Remote Sensor System (TRSS) Phase V, operating from 138–153 MHz (2.17–1.96 m).	US Marine Corps	
AN/GSQ-259	Miniature Intrusion Detection System (MIDS) attended ground sensor system operating from 143.6–143.75 MHz (2.09–2.09 m)	US Marine Corps	
AN/GSQ-261	Tactical Remote Sensor System (TRSS) unattended suite of sensors to detect vehicle and personnel movement	US Marine Corps	
AN/GSQ-272	Sentinel Collection, Processing, exploitation, Analysis and Dissemination (CPAD) Distributed Common Ground System (DCGS)		

AN/GSS – Ground Special/Combination Detection/Range and Bearing Search Systems
Designation	Purpose/Description	Location/Used By	Manufacturer
AN/GSS-1	Medium-range transportable Electronic Search Central system comprising AN/TPS-1D search radar and AN/TPX-19 Identification Friend or Foe (IFF) interrogator	Project Nike	Bell Labs, MIT Radiation Laboratory
AN/GSS-7	Mobile 500 kW tactical radar operating between 1.25–1.35 GHz (23.98–22.21 cm)		Raytheon

=== GVx – Ground Visual/Visible Light Systems ===
AN/GVS – Ground Visual/Visible Light Detecting/Range and Bearing Search Systems
Designation	Purpose/Description	Location/Used By	Manufacturer
AN/GVS-3	Ruby laser ranging system with photomultiplier detector and red outer precious stone light exciter		
AN/GVS-5	5 lb (2.3 kg) hand-held laser rangefinder with 7× power telescope and 7° field of view, it has a 33 ft (10 m) accuracy at a distance of 6.2 mi (10 km)	US Army	RCA Corp

=== GYx – Ground Digital Processing/Computer Systems ===
AN/GYC – Ground Data Processing/Computer Communication Systems
Designation	Purpose/Description	Location/Used By	Manufacturer
AN/GYC-7	Two-man transportable Unit Level Message Switch (ULMS)	US Marine Corps	

AN/GYK – Ground Data Processing/Computer Systems
Designation	Purpose/Description	Location/Used By	Manufacturer
AN/GYK-3	D825 modular data processing computer	AN/GSA-51 Radar Course Directing Group	
AN/GYK-12	Ruggedized computer for use in the TACFIRE tactical fire direction system		Litton Industries
AN/GYK-29	Battery Computer System (BCS) for artillery fire missions		
AN/GYK-47	General field artillery computer set, replaced by AN/GYK-60	US Marine Corps	
AN/GYK-60	Advanced Field Artillery Tactical Data System (AFATDS) automated Command and Control (C^{2}) system for fire support operations	US Marine Corps	General Dynamics

AN/GYQ – Ground Data Processing/Computer Special/Combination Systems
Designation	Purpose/Description	Location/Used By	Manufacturer
AN/GYQ-92	Global Command and Control System (GCCS) automates data processing of Command, Control, Communications, Computers and Intelligence (C^{4}I) tasks	US Marine Corps	

AN/:
- Top
- A
- B
- C
- D
- F
- G
- M–Z
- See also
- Notes
- References
- Bibliography
- Further reading
- External links
- Main list

== See also ==
- Joint Electronics Type Designation System – Unclassified designation system for United States military electronic equipment - The AN/ system defined
- Signal Corps Radio – U.S. Army radio systems
- Category:Military electronics of the United States
- Wikipedia:Stand-alone lists

=== Lists ===
- List of equipment of the United States Armed Forces
- List of equipment of the United States Air Force
- List of equipment of the United States Army
- List of equipment of the United States Coast Guard
- List of equipment of the United States Marine Corps
- List of equipment of the United States Navy
- List of United States radar types
- List of U.S. Signal Corps Vehicles (V-list)
- List of World War II electronic warfare equipment

== Bibliography ==
- Army Science Board (January 1979). Military Operations in Built-Up Areas (MOBA) (PDF) (Report). Washington, D.C.: Office of the Assistant of the Army. DTIC ADB034309. (155 pages)
- Bittencourt, Raul Pereira (June 1976). Electronic warfare technology (PDF) (Electrical Engineer thesis). Monterey, California: Naval Postgraduate School. hdl:10945/17747. DTIC ADA028210. (147 pages)
- Caton, Maj Scott William (August 1980). Landing Force Organizational Systems Study (LFOSS) Annual Report for 1979 (LFOSS-79) (PDF) (Report). Quantico, Virginia: Headquarters, US Marine Corps. DTIC ADA118028. (371 pages)
- Crawford, Richard H; Cook, Lindsey F (9 April 1952). United States Army in World War II - Statistics - Procurement (PDF). Office of the Chief of Military History - Department of the Army. (96 pages)
- DoD (1964). Department of Defense Appropriations for Fiscal Year 1965. Washington, D.C.: United States Government Printing Office. (1,744 pages)
- Fales, David; Lorence, Robert J; Hauptman, Robert; Day, John M; Hesse, George L (May 1967). ECOM-0006-1 High Altitude Radio Relay Systems - Semi-Annual Report (PDF) (Report). Fort Monmouth, New Jersey: US Army Communications-Electronics Command. DTIC AD0659400. (323 pages)
- Gaitanakis, George-Konstantinos; Vlastaras, Andreas; Vassos, Nikolaos; Limnaios, George; Zikidis, Konstantinos C (2019). "Infrared Search and Track Systems as an Anti-Stealth Approach" (PDF). Journal of Computation & Modelling. 9 (1). Scientific Press: 33–53. ISSN 1792-8850. (21 pages)
- Holler, Roger A (January 2014). The Evolution of the Sonobuoy from World War Ii to the Cold War (U) (PDF). Navmar Applied Sciences Corp. (27 pages)
- Jewell, Larry; Clancey, Patrick (20 November 1945). Radar Bulletin NO. 2A (RADTWO A) - The Tactical Use of Radar in Aircraft. Navy Department - Chief of Naval Operations. (173 pages)
- JPRS Report (29 December 1987). Soviet Union, Foreign Military Review, No. 6 (PDF) (Report). Arlington, Virginia: Joint Publications Research Service. DTIC ADA348280. (53 pages)
- Kleinschmidt (February 1970). Military Telecommunications Equipment (PDF) (Product Catalog). Deerfield, Illinois: Kleinschmidt. (61 pages)
- MIL-HDBK-162A (15 December 1965). "Radar Equipment". TM 11-487C-1 Military Standardization Handbook United States (PDF) (Technical Manual). Vol. 1. Washington, D.C.: Headquarters, Department of the Army. (1,531 pages)
- NAVSHIPS (December 1965). "Section 4.12 - Miscellaneous Test Equipment". NAVSHIPS 94200.4-2 - Supplement 2: Directory of Electronics Test Equipment (PDF) (Technical Manual). Great Lakes, Illinois: US Navy Electronics Supply Office. (222 pages)
- Petterson, Göran Sven Erik (September 1993). An illustrated overview of ESM and ECM systems (PDF). CORE (Master of Science in Systems Engineering thesis). Naval Postgraduate School. p. 85. (145 pages)
- Pollock, David (1996). "Countermeasure Systems". In Accetta, Joseph S; Shumaker, David L (eds.). The Infrared and Electro-optical Systems Handbook (PDF). Vol. 7. Bellingham, Washington: SPIE. ISBN 0819410721. OCLC 912063854. DTIC ADA364021. (520 pages)
- Teague, James "Ralph"; Schmieder, David (October 2021). The History of Forward-Looking Infrared (FLIR) (PDF) (Report). Defense Systems Information Analysis Center. (127 pages)
- Travis, Maj Kenneth L (12 May 1988). The Integration of US Army Electronic Warfare Capabilities in J-SEAD Operations (PDF) (Report). Maxwell AFB, Alabama: Air Command and Staff College, Air University. DTIC ADA192616. (44 pages)
- Wahl, Katrina G; Riordan, James L (30 December 2005). TM 2000-OD/2C Principal Technical Characteristics of US Marine Corps Communication-Electronics Equipment (PDF) (Technical Manual). Quantico, Virginia: US Marine Corps. (364 pages)
