= SCR-720 =

Type of aircraft radar

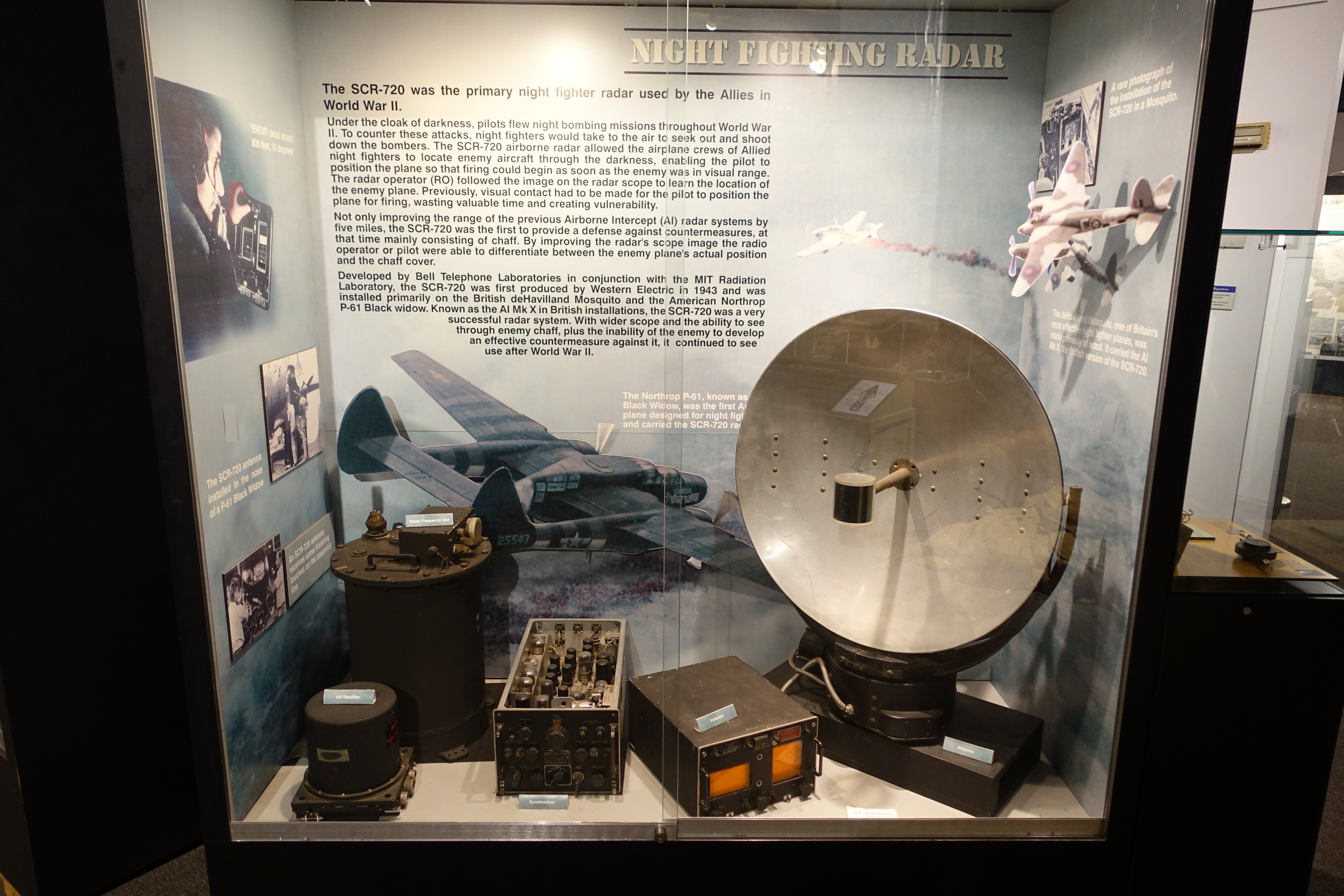
- An SCR-720 displayed at the US National Electronics Museum
- Country of origin: United States of America
- Designer: Bell Telephone Laboratories; MIT Radiation Laboratory
- Introduced: 1944
- Type: Aircraft interception
- Frequency: 3.3 GHz (S-band)
- PRF: 1500 pps (357 for beacons)
- Beamwidth: ~10º
- Pulsewidth: 3/4 μs (2 1/4 μs for beacons)
- RPM: 360 (100 for beacons)
- Range: 375 to 50,000 ft (114–15,240 m)
- Altitude: 500 ft (150 m) and up
- Diameter: 29 in (74 cm)
- Azimuth: 75º to either side
- Elevation: 50º up, 30º down
- Precision: 5º
- Power: 70 kW
- Other names: SCR-520, SCR-517, AI Mk. X, ARI 5570

The SCR-720 was a World War II aircraft interception radar designed by the Radiation Laboratory (RadLab) at MIT in the United States. It was used by US Army Air Force night fighters as well as the Royal Air Force (RAF) in a slightly modified version known as Radar, Aircraft Interception, Mark X, or AI Mk. X for short.

SCR-720 was the first radar to successfully use the "helical-scan" technique, which became common in night fighter radars. The concept was first raised in early 1940 as part of UK research using the cavity magnetron as the basis of a microwave-frequency radar system. They abandoned this approach as they were unable to solve the problem of feeding microwave power to a spinning antenna. The concept was revealed to US researchers as part of the Tizard Mission during the summer of 1940, and the RadLab decided to press on with the concept. This led to the SCR-520 of 1942, designed for installation on large aircraft like the P-70 Havoc and P-61 Black Widow. Only 108 were produced, and most were later converted to the sea-search role as the SCR-517.

Western Electric started a redesign and introduced a somewhat lighter and much simpler version as the SCR-720 in late 1942. It arrived in the midst of RAF Bomber Command's efforts to introduce the "window" which proved to be equally effective on German radars as well as the RAF's own. A search for a solution led to the SCR-720 being accepted by the RAF, and window was released for use in 1943. Production versions of the Mk. X did not arrive until much later than expected, in December 1943, and did not start replacing the older AI Mk. VIII radar in front-line units until early 1944. This was just in time; the Luftwaffe began using window over the UK in January 1944 as part of their Operation Steinbock.

The SCR-720 was used by the US for only a short time as newer and longer-ranged radar systems were developed in the post-war era. The same was supposed to be true in RAF service as well, but a lengthy series of delays in various programs kept the Mk. X in service well into the 1950s. The last aircraft with Mk. X, the de Havilland Sea Vixen, remained in second-line roles until 1970.

== Development ==
=== Cavity magnetron ===
The UK had led development of airborne radars with the introduction of the AI Mk. IV radar system, which reached operational service in 1940. This system was built using conventional vacuum tube (valve) electronics from an experimental television receiver. The tubes could operate at a maximum frequency of about 200 MHz before their efficiency fell off dramatically. Generally, an antenna has to be at least 1/2 the wavelength being used to get good gain; the Mk. IV's 200 MHz frequency corresponds to a 1.5 m wavelength, requiring antennas to be on the order of a metre. This proved difficult to arrange on an aircraft, and both resolution and detection range suffered as a result.

The need for shorter wavelengths was also important to the Royal Navy, who needed improve resolution to detect the conning towers of semi-submerged U-boats. They led research into shorter-wavelength systems. As part of this research, they began funding the University of Birmingham's efforts with klystrons. These were not successful, but two Birmingham physicists with little else to do ended up producing a solution, the cavity magnetron. Their first example produced 500 W of radio power, better than the best klystrons in the world. They pushed this to over 1,000 W within weeks. The main Birmingham team gave up on the klystron and began work solely on the magnetron. GEC was introduced to the work and applied their tube-making knowledge to the system, almost immediately introducing models producing 5 kW and by the summer had examples producing 15 kW.

=== Tizard Mission ===
In the summer of 1940 the situation in the UK was dire; the British Expeditionary Force barely escaped a total loss during the Dunkirk evacuation and the RAF was outmatched perhaps three to one by the Luftwaffe. Although great effort had been made to install the Chain Home radars and the Dowding system to manage it, the possibility of losing an air war and subsequent invasion was very real. Henry Tizard, who played a founding role in the development of radar as leader of the Tizard Committee, was aware that the pressing needs of the immediate war effort meant that the UK would be unable to fully take advantage of the many technological advances they had made. He began to press for permission to show these technologies to his counterparts in the US, where American production capacity could be used to get these devices into the war effort in much greater quantity.

A great debate broke out over the relative merits of revealing so many advances to a country that would be able to make immediate use of them to great financial reward. In August 1940, Winston Churchill had enough of the arguments and personally directed Tizard to begin contacting US researchers. Tizard formed up a group of seven, including himself as the lead and John Cockcroft as his deputy. For the scientific portion of the group, Tizard brought "Taffy" Bowen who had led development of the AI Mk. IV before being sidelined due to managerial fighting with A.P. Rowe, who ran the Air Ministry's radar research establishment. Tizard and a military liaison flew to Washington, DC on 22 August 1940, while the rest of the team left for Canada on the Canadian ocean liner RMS Duchess of Richmond on 30 August.

In Washington, Tizard met with Vannevar Bush, who had arranged the formation of the National Defense Research Committee (NDRC) only weeks earlier in late June. The rest of the team arrived in Halifax on 6 September, and Washington on the 12th. The initial meetings did not go well as both groups seemed reluctant to tip their hand on their research. The logjam broke on 19 September when the topic of radar came up. The British team was surprised to learn that the US had already begun deployment of a longwave radar system similar to their own Chain Home.

The key moment came when one of the US Navy representatives demonstrated an experimental microwave tube that worked at 10 cm, but noted that it made only tens of watts and that they had reached a dead end in development. As soon as the statement was made, Bowen reached into his "black box" (Note: Literally a black box, Bowen placed the magnetron and many design papers in large black metal box originally intended for deeds and similar legal papers.) and pulled out E1189 No. 12, a magnetron operating at 9.1 cm and capable of producing at least 10 kW. The reveal had the effect of a bombshell, cutting away remaining reticence on both sides, who quickly began sharing details of all of their research.

=== Rad Lab ===
The magnetron came under the scrutiny of Alfred Loomis, a successful businessman turned researcher who had already set up a "Microwave Committee" within the NDRC. With this clear demonstration that microwaves were practical, Loomis began to form a dedicated research lab which opened in November as the Radiation Laboratory at MIT. In spite of great secrecy, news of the Rad Lab became well known in research circles, and scientists from around the country and Canada were travelling to Boston on nothing more than rumour. When they heard what was being done, they would instantly ask to join the effort. By mid-November this was up to one prominent scientist a day.

Bowen stayed in the US while most members of the team returned to the UK. He travelled to the General Electric labs in New Jersey and demonstrated the magnetron to the researchers from GE and Bell Labs. The device managed 15,000 W on 6 October. Bell took up production, delivering the first 30 by the end of the month. These were split among a number of groups, especially Loomis' group, and a number of microwave projects started. Western Electric, Bell's production arm, also took up production of the existing VHF Mk. IV set to speed production and help supply RAF needs. This emerged as the SCR-540, but saw limited use.

The Rad Lab started their magnetron experiments with a simple system using separate transmit and receive antennas, each consisting of a short dipole antenna positioned in front of a parabolic reflector. They set it up on the roof of the Rad Lab, and on 4 January 1941 they were able to pick up reflections from buildings on the other side of the Charles River. They then began modifying this "roof system" for a single-antenna using a duplexer similar to the ones used in the UK's experimental sets. This used a network of tuned conductors cut to specific lengths. As was the case in the UK, the system significantly reduced the output signal strength. Bowen notes that a hint of pessimism took over as they attempted to solve these problems. The system was finally tuned and working by early February, and on the 7th they detected echoes from an aircraft flying over Boston Airport some 4 to 5 miles (6.4–8.0 km) away.

=== Helical vs. spiral ===
During this period, the UK researchers at TRE had been continuing to work on the problems caused by the tuned switching network. The solution came from a suggestion by Arthur H. Cooke of the Clarendon Laboratory, who suggested that a vacuum tube filled with a dilute gas would "flash over" due to the high energy from the transmitter, conducting the energy to the antenna, but then quickly de-ionize and stop conducting as soon as the signal ended. A perfect tube for this purpose turned out to have been just invented to solve another problem with microwave radars, and the resulting soft Sutton tube was able to rapidly move into production in March 1941. As the Sutton tube absorbed very little energy, the output of the radar systems immediately doubled, and the constant retuning of the network was eliminated.

With this problem finally solved, the team began plans to bring the system, known as "AIS" for "Aircraft Interception, Sentimetric", into service as soon as possible. The last remaining significant problem was how to use the radar's narrow beam to scan the sky in front of the fighter. They had originally considered a method known as "helical-scan", which spun the parabolic reflector dish around a vertical axis, causing the beam to make a series of horizontal stripes while the dish angled up and down to scan vertically. Feeding microwave energy from the magnetron to a spinning antenna presented a problem that would take some time to solve.

Looking for expedient solutions, they began to consider simpler ways to move the antenna that did not require a complex connection. Eventually, following experiments by Bernard Lovell, they decided on leaving the dipole antenna on a fixed mounting facing forward, and nutating the parabolic reflector in circles behind it. This "spiral-scan" system meant the antenna could be fed using a simple coaxial cable, with the downside that the beam became increasingly de-focused at greater angles from the centreline.

At the RadLab, the immediate need to solve the scanning problem was not as pressing, and they decided to continue to develop the helical-scan solution. They quickly solved the problems, and had a working system by March 1941. This was fit in the nose of an obsolete Douglas B-18 Bolo bomber. The aircraft took to the air for the first time on 10 March 1941, the very same day that the British AIS with spiral-scanning flew for the first time in the UK. During this flight, Bowen estimated the maximum range of the US unit to be about 10 miles (16 km), and on their return flight they flew past the naval yards at New London, Connecticut and detected a surfaced submarine at about 4 to 5 miles (6.4–8.0 km).

Having heard of this performance, Hugh Dowding, who was visiting the US at the time, pressed to see it for himself. On 29 April, after detecting a target aircraft at about 2 to 3 miles (3.2–4.8 km) Dowding asked Bowen about the minimum range (Note: Dowding had earlier flown with Bowen while testing the Mk. IV and had asked for a demonstration of minimum range, and was apparently unhappy with the results. This had been a topic of considerable debate while Bowen developed the Mk. IV, and was one of the main reasons for his dismissal and move to the US.) which they demonstrated to be about 500 feet (150 m). Dowding was impressed, and before leaving to return to the UK, met with his counterpart, General Cheney, telling him about the system's performance and pressing for its immediate development for purchase by the RAF.

=== Testing the system ===
Western Electric was given the contract to deliver five more units with all haste, under the name AI-10, for "Aircraft Interception, 10 cm". One of these would be kept by Western Electric, another by Bell Telephone, one would replace the original lash-up in the B-18, another sent to the National Research Council (NRC) in Canada, and the final one sent to the UK. Originally the UK copy was to be installed in either a Douglas A-20 Havoc or the RAF version known as the Boston, but neither of these aircraft were available. Instead, the Canadian NRC supplied a Boeing 247 airliner, and after a test fit to ensure the radar could be mounted properly, the aircraft was disassembled and shipped to the UK. It arrived at RAF Ford and was re-assembled on 14 August and given the UK registration DZ203. The set was widely tested, to everyone's satisfaction. (Note: Lovell states it was tested in a Vickers Wellington, not DZ203. White makes the same claim, but given the context, he is likely repeating Lovell.)

AI-10 was similar in performance to the AIS systems of the same vintage, but Bowen found no strong desire on the part of the RAF to buy the device. This has been attributed to a number of factors including overwork by the AMRE team fitting their own equipment and lacking time to test AI-10, as well as hinting of "not invented here" syndrome. However, two technical issues appear to be the main reasons offered in other sources. One was that the system did not display range directly on the pilot's display, (Note: The British Mk. IX featured a line that grew as the aircraft approached its target, allowing the pilot to tell the range at a glance.) and had to be switched to a separate display mode that was described as essentially useless. Moreover, in spite of having been designed to fit in the Beaufighter, the set that emerged was too large and far too power hungry for that aircraft.

=== SCR-520 ===
In spite of UK indifference, the US began pushing for production for their own use in the P-61 Black Widow. This resulted in the SCR-520 entering production even though the British cancelled their order. There were two variations, the original SCR-520-A, and the -B which added an IFF receiver which could also be used for beacon tracking, the latter of which required the maximum range to be extended to 100 miles (160 km). The SCR-520-B, used in the P-70, weighed 600 pounds (270 kg) in twelve pieces, with six large units that had to be mounted near the radar dish, the largest of which was about a 1 yard (0.91 m) on a side. Further, the dish rotated on a vertical axis required room between it and the nearest part of the aircraft. These limitations meant it could be fitted in only the largest aircraft and so was unsuitable for the smaller, high-performance fighters used in the UK, like the de Havilland Mosquito.

The same basic equipment was also used for a variety of other developments. One AI-10 unit was adapted with a plan-position indicator (PPI) and fit to Lockheed Electra Junior XJO-3. This first flew on 1 August 1941 and in testing between then and 16 October proved to be able to detect aircraft at about 3.5 miles (5.6 km) and ships at 40 miles (64 km). The air-to-air range was no better than the basic AI-10 set, but the PPI display and long range against ships made an excellent air-to-surface-vessel (ASV) radar system. This was put into production as the AN/APS-2 for patrol aircraft and the ASG for K-class blimps. Post-war, the AN/APS-2 would be adapted as some of the earliest dedicated weather radar systems.

=== SCR-720 ===
Western Electric took the original MIT design and modified it to produce the slightly smaller SCR-720-A, and then to the definitive SCR-720. This was otherwise similar in performance to the SCR-520-B but was significantly smaller and reduced 20% in weight to 412 pounds (187 kg). With the introduction of the SCR-720, the older SCR-520 units were adapted for shipping detection, as this task was normally carried out from large patrol aircraft with ample room for the system. These units became known as SCR-517.

By the summer of 1942, RAF Bomber Command was in the midst of gearing up for a major bombing campaign that would result in some of the first 1,000 bomber raids. The Luftwaffe responded by dramatically increasing the number and performance of their night fighter fleet, while also greatly improving command and control systems to make them effective. Sending in large numbers of aircraft against these improved defences was a significant concern. One solution that had been developed was "window", today more widely known as chaff, which would confuse the German radars and make tracking individual aircraft difficult. Window consisted of nothing more than aluminized paper strips, so it would be trivial for the Germans to make their own version as soon as they learned of it, and potentially re-open the air war against England. A furious debate broke out between Bomber Command who demanded its immediate use, and Fighter Command who wanted to test their defences against window.

Testing window against the Mk. VIII in September 1942 demonstrated the radar was rendered almost useless. This was cause for concern, but a potential solution was already at hand. In parallel with the development of the microwave systems, other teams in the TRE had been working on a system known as "lock follow", today better known as radar lock-on, which automatically tracked a selected target. It was believed this system would ignore the window, which rapidly moved away from the aircraft dropping it. In tests in November 1942 it was found this new Mk. IX radar would instead strongly lock onto the window and made tracking the aircraft impossible. Its designer came up with some simple changes to improve its behaviour. On 23 December 1942 during the first tests of the improved version, the aircraft was attacked by a pair of friendly Supermarine Spitfires and shot down, destroying the only prototype and killing the lead designer.

That same month, the RAF received its first example of the SCR-720. In tests carried out in January 1943, it was found that by rapidly switching between the different range settings, the aircraft could be picked out even in heavy window. The set was then moved to Mosquito DZ659 for further tests, which were considered very successful. Only minor concerns were found; the radio frequency feeder cable was poor, they wanted a new visor around the B-scope display, the range settings should be changed to 3, 5, 10 and 100 miles. The TRE sent in an order of 2,900 sets under the name AI Mk. X, known as SCR-720B in the US.

Western Electric had been concentrating on the original SCR-520 up to this point, to fill earlier orders for the P-61. When this aircraft ran into delays of its own, the USAAF ordered examples of Beaufighters and Mosquitoes for their own night fighter units. With both the RAF and USAAF ordering examples, Western Electric changed their production schedules and promised initial units in May 1943 and full production by August. They promised 250 to the RAF by the end of 1943, and 120 a month after that date. With this agreement in hand, window was released for use in July 1943.

=== In service ===
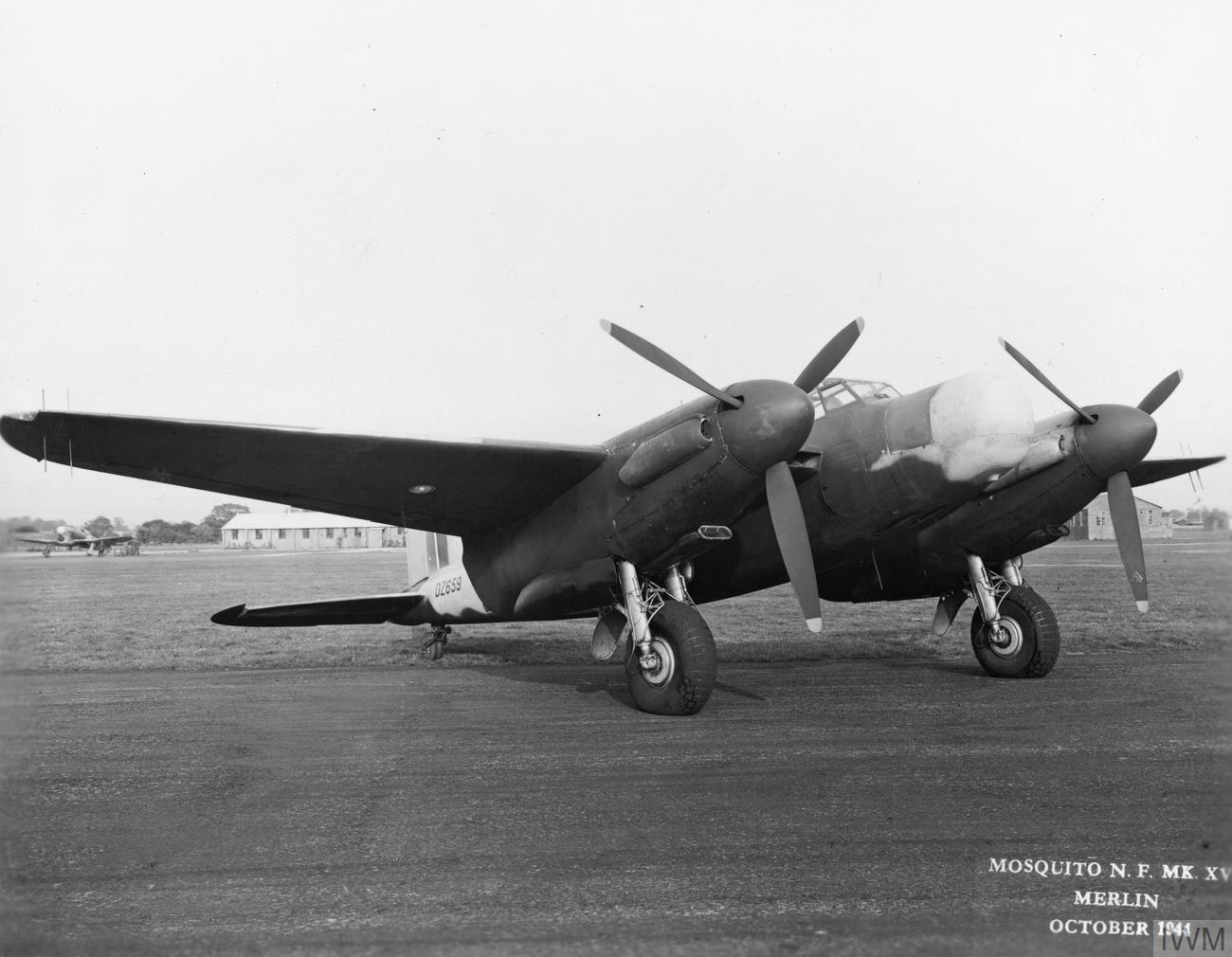
The use of the "universal radome", as seen on this Mosquito Mk. XVII, allowed either the Mk. X or Mk. VIII to be used without major changes.

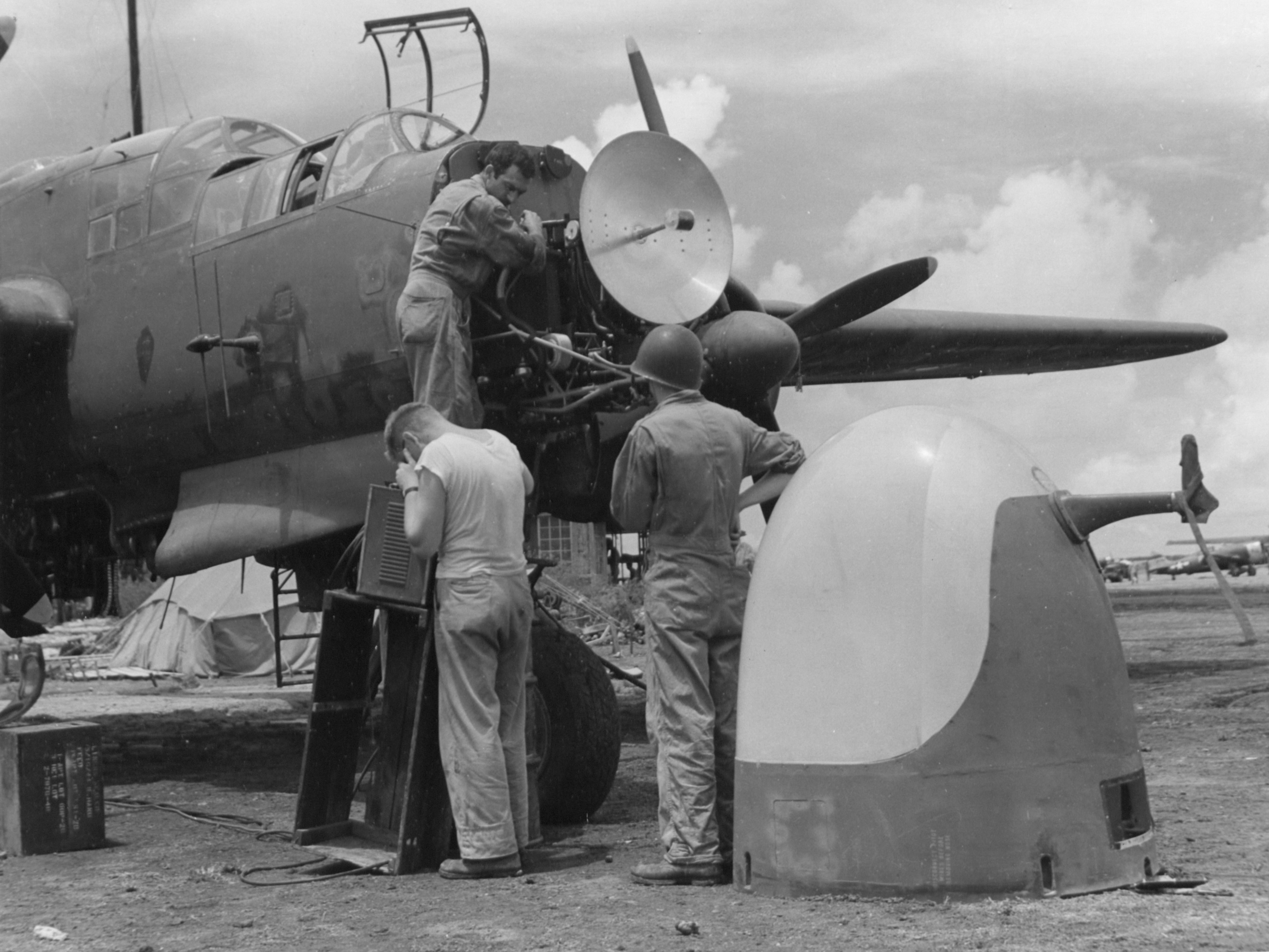
The SCR-720 radar unit mounted to a P-61 Black Widow of the 425th Night Fighter Squadron undergoes maintenance on Saipan some time in 1945.

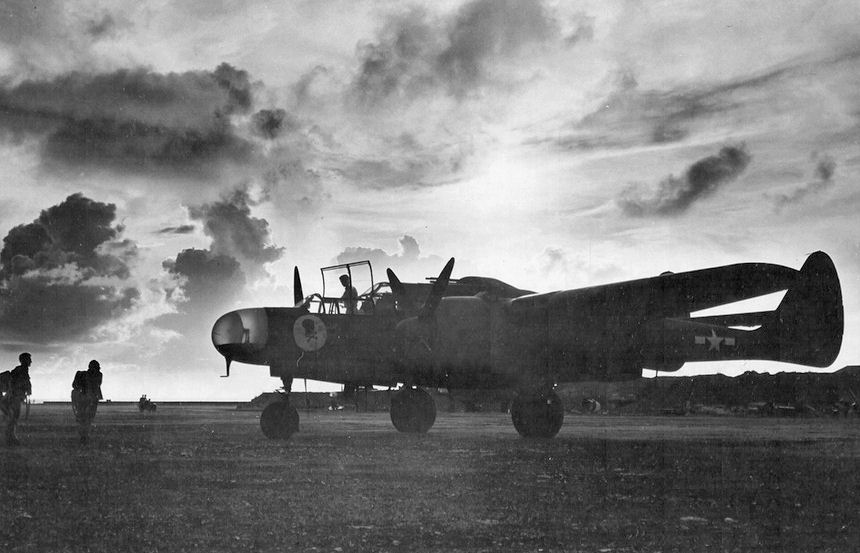
This shot clearly shows the SCR-720 in its partially transparent plexiglass radome on the P-61. The far forward mounting of the dish that allows it to spin vertically is evident.

The delivery promises proved optimistic. The first example did not arrive in England until 12 July, lacking any of the requested changes. Forty had arrived by the late autumn, again without the modifications. These were then hand-modified by staff at the TRE. During tests, it was found that noise from the transmitter was interfering with the voice radio set, enough to be considered "serious". This required another series of modifications including new RF chokes, moving items about and moving the radio antennas outside the aircraft. The first fully operational production example was delivered at the end of January 1944.

Two squadrons had been selected for conversion to Mk. X, No. 85 and No. 25, both of which had received their units by the end of February. This timing turned out to be extremely lucky. As it turned out, the Germans were indeed making their own version of Window, Dupple, with an aim of opening a new air campaign against the UK in late 1943. Due to many delays of their own, their aircraft were not assembled and readied until late January 1944, when Operation Steinbock opened with comical results. During the month of February, the two squadrons had sixty contacts but only seven successful interceptions. The poor results were attributed not to the German Dupple, but that the contacts were often Focke-Wulf Fw 190s, which the Mosquito was barely able to catch, as well as the "vigorous evasive tactics" used by the Luftwaffe pilots.

P-61's, the first US aircraft with the system, normally the SCR-520, arrived in the UK in late June 1944 as part of 422 NFS and started flying operational missions in July. By this time Steinbock had been long abandoned and the aircraft mostly flew as intruders. June also saw the first deliveries of the P-61 to Guadalcanal. Missions in the Pacific generally did not find any targets, but on the occasions they did, the enemy was normally flying in formation and the P-61s would often shoot down several in a row. P-61s remained in service in Europe after the war, waiting for replacement by jet powered designs, but these took some time to arrive. The last P-61 unit, the 68th Fighter Squadron, received its aircraft in from the 421st Fighter Squadron and operated until 1950 when it became part of a fighter-bomber group with the F-82 Twin Mustang and moved to Korea.

=== Post-war ===
In the immediate post-war era, the British felt another war was at least a decade off. At the time, radar was undergoing rapid development. For both of these reasons, the Air Ministry felt there was no reason to introduce a new design as by the time they might be needed far better units would be available. Wartime Mk. X units were fit to the improved post-war Mosquitos that formed the backbone of the night fighter squadrons. With the introduction of the Tu-4 Bull, the Soviet copy of the Boeing B-29 Superfortress, the RAF carried out tests of their Mosquitos against US Superfortresses and found they were almost useless against these aircraft. This led to the rapid conversion of the Gloster Meteor as a night fighter with Mk. X awaiting an improved design. They were happy to see that detection range in the Meteor was slightly better than it was in the Mosquito, although this may have been due to the switch to metal aircraft as test targets, whereas earlier tests had normally been carried out with Mosquitos as both the radar aircraft and test target.

A more capable dedicated night fighter was under development, the Gloster Javelin, which would mount a new radar that was also under development, AI.17. Early during that program, the Korean War broke out, and suddenly a war in Europe appeared much closer than ten years. An Egyptian order for de Havilland Vampires was cancelled and these were also fit with Mk. X to round out the night fighter ranks whilst awaiting Javelin. de Havilland had also been working on an updated Vampire known as the Venom, also mounting Mk. X, and saw service in four RAF squadrons. As Javelin ran into delays, the decision was made to extend the life of the Meteor and Vampire fleet by mounting new radars, either Mk. 21 or Mk. 22, the US-built AN/APS-57 and AN/APQ-43, respectively. All of these were eventually replaced by the Javelin and it is not clear when the last Mk. X went out of service in the RAF.

The Royal Navy found the Venom interesting and took it on as Sea Venom in a number of squadrons. Many of these saw combat during the Suez Crisis. These remained in service with Mk. X until being replaced by the much more capable de Havilland Sea Vixen in 1959, mounting AI.18. In front-line service for only a few years, the Mk. X was not upgraded. Sea Venom aircraft continued flying in second-line duties until 1970.

== Description ==
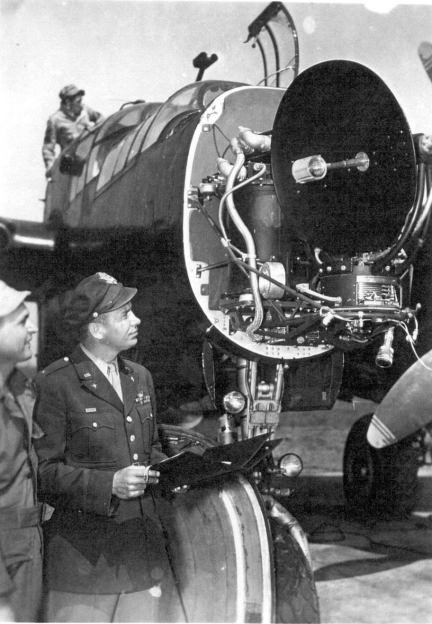
Details of the antenna's mounting and rotation motor are clear in this post-war image. This aircraft was one of several P-61's being used in the Thunderstorm Project to characterize storms using microwave radar.

The SCR-720 had four in-cockpit units, the Control Box BC-1150-A, Synchronizer BC-1148-A, (Operator's) Indicator BC-1151-A and (Pilot's) Indicator BC-1152-A. The Control Box was the primary power control and included an ammeter and the main power switches for the receiver, transmitter, antenna motor and a rotating dial to control the antenna tilt limits. Most of the operating controls were on the Synchronizer, which included tuning and gain, range settings, the mode switch for radar or beacon tracking, and the brightness controls for the intensity of the range scale range marker on the B-scope.

The Operator's Indicator had two 5 inches (130 mm) rectangular cathode ray tube displays. The display on the right was used for the initial detection and approach. It displays the range of targets along the Y axis, and their angle relative to the aircraft heading along X. A target directly ahead of the aircraft would be positioned in the center of the X axis, and displaced upward from the bottom to display the range relative to the current range setting as selected on the Synchronizer. A rough estimate of the range and angle could be made by comparing the position of any "blips" to an illuminated scale on the front of the display. The scale lighting intensity was the only major control mounted on the Indicator, along with smaller controls for less-frequently used controls to focus and center the displays.

Once a target "blip" of interest was seen, the operator would use the Range Dial on the Synchronizer to move a line, or "strobe", up and down the display until it lay on top of the blip. Any objects within a small displacement of this selected range would then appear on the left-hand display. The left hand display was a C-scope, displaying the relative angle horizontally along X and vertically along Y. Any blips on this display were also sent to the Pilot's Indicator, a smaller version of the same display. As a C-scope does not directly display range, which is needed for the pilot to know when to look up from the display, this information was instead provided by a series of three Range Lamps above and to the right of the display.
