= WSR-1 =

WSR-1 – 4
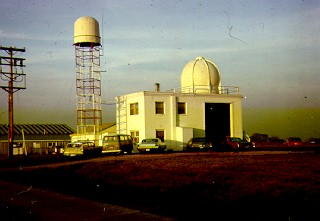
- The upper air and radar (WSR-1) site, on the left, at the North Omaha Airport from 1954 to 1974.
- Country of origin: United States
- Introduced: 1946
- No. built: 82
- Type: Weather radar
- Frequency: 3.3 GHz (S band)
- PRF: 325 and 650 Hz
- Beamwidth: 3.5°
- Pulsewidth: 1 and 2μs excepted 1 and 4 μs on WSR-4
- Range: more than 100 kilometres (62 mi)
- Diameter: 2 m
- Azimuth: 0 to 360º
- Elevation: -2 to 50º
- Power: 50 kW

The WSR-1 or Weather Surveillance Radar-1 was one of the first weather radars and the first used by a civilian organization in the US. The WSR-1 series was a modified version of the AN/APS-2F radar, which the Weather Bureau (now the National Weather Service) acquired from the Navy. The WSR-1A, WSR-3, and WSR-4 were also variants of this radar. The first WSR-1 in the USA was at Washington National Airport in Washington, D.C., in 1947, and the last WSR-3 was retired by 1978.

== History ==
In 1946, the US Weather Bureau (ancestor of the National Weather Service) retrieved 25 AN/APS-2F aeronautical radars from the US Navy. The radars have been modified and adapted to meteorology and then delivered at the rate of five per year. The modifications were conducted by the weather service and the modified radars took the successive names of WSR-1, WSR-1A, WSR-3 and WSR-4, depending on the gradual improvement of hardware. The first WSR-1 was put into service at the Washington, DC, national airport on March 12, 1947. The second began service on June 1, 1947 in Wichita, Kansas, in the heart of the Tornado Alley. In August of the same year, the WSR-1 installed at Norfolk, Nebraska proved its usefulness and cost savings by alerting the Elkhorn Valley power system of the approach of thunderstorms.

Three particularly severe weather events occurred during the spring of 1953 and led to the establishment of the Texas Tornado Warning Network. Major cities in Texas have been asked to fund the operation (both the private and public sectors) of modifying and implementing the WSR-1, WSR-1A, WSR-3 and WSR-4. The Weather Bureau agreed to operate these radars and maintain them in order to alert the public in case of danger, as soon as a visual confirmation was obtained. The establishment of the network became effective during a kick-off meeting on June 24, 1953. It took nearly six years for the network to be fully operational; 17 radars have been modified and installed thanks to the joint efforts of local authorities, the state, federal agencies and a university.

The APS-2F modified by Texas A & M University, although not actually part of the tornado surveillance network, was at least once used for warning purposes on April 5, 1956. After 1956 the modification of the APS-2F radars in their WSR-1, WSR-1A, WSR-3 and WSR-4 versions was assigned to the Weather Office headquarters which had to move some antennas that had originally been installed to locations where it was difficult to ensure the maintenance.

In April 1975, at the peak of the program, 82 WSR-1, WSR-1A, WSR-3 and WSR-4 were in service. Some were replaced by WSR-57s, but most remained in service until they were replaced by WSR-74s during a period from 1976 to 1980. No more remains in service today.

== Characteristics ==
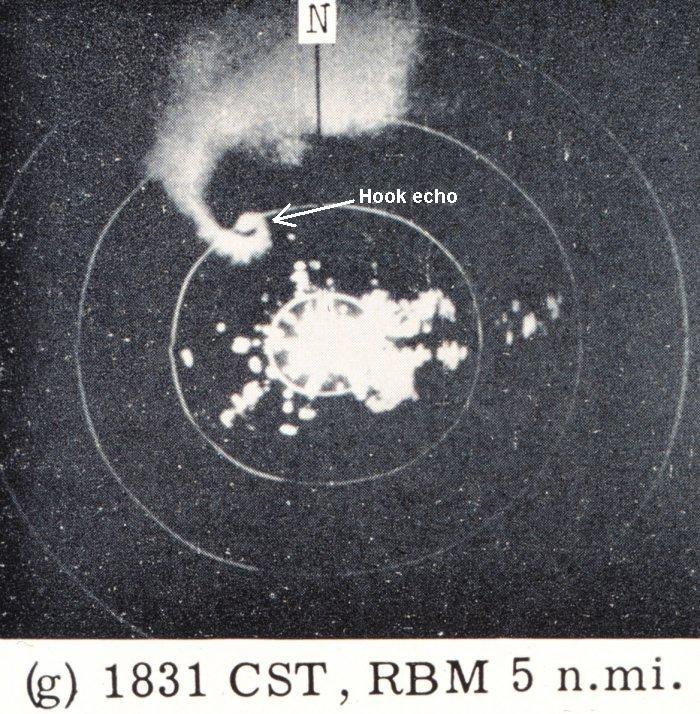
Meriden, Kansas, tornado as observed by the Topeka Weather Bureau WSR-3 radar.

The WSR-1 to 4 series, the first operational weather radar in the United States, used the AN/APS-2F electronics, including a superheterodyne receiver, but with a larger antenna. As time progressed and experience with the original design increased, the Weather Bureau felt confident enough to upgrade the WSR-1 to WSR-1A, eventually finalizing on the WSR-3 and WSR-4 model. The WSR-4 upgrades included the removal of the original aircraft-oriented antenna in favor of a larger antenna, and the addition of a power converter such that it would now have the ability to function on conventional power.

The main difference between the versions was their display and the control of the probed atmospheric volume. The diameter of the dish was nearly 2 meters by the WSR-4. The wavelength used was about 10 cm which corresponds to a frequency of 3 GHz. This frequency is in the S band which is still used by the current US weather radar network. Thanks to the radars operative frequency, the attenuation due to the rain was almost zero, but the detection of a light rain or snow was delicate because of the weakness of the signal emitted by the radar (50 kW).

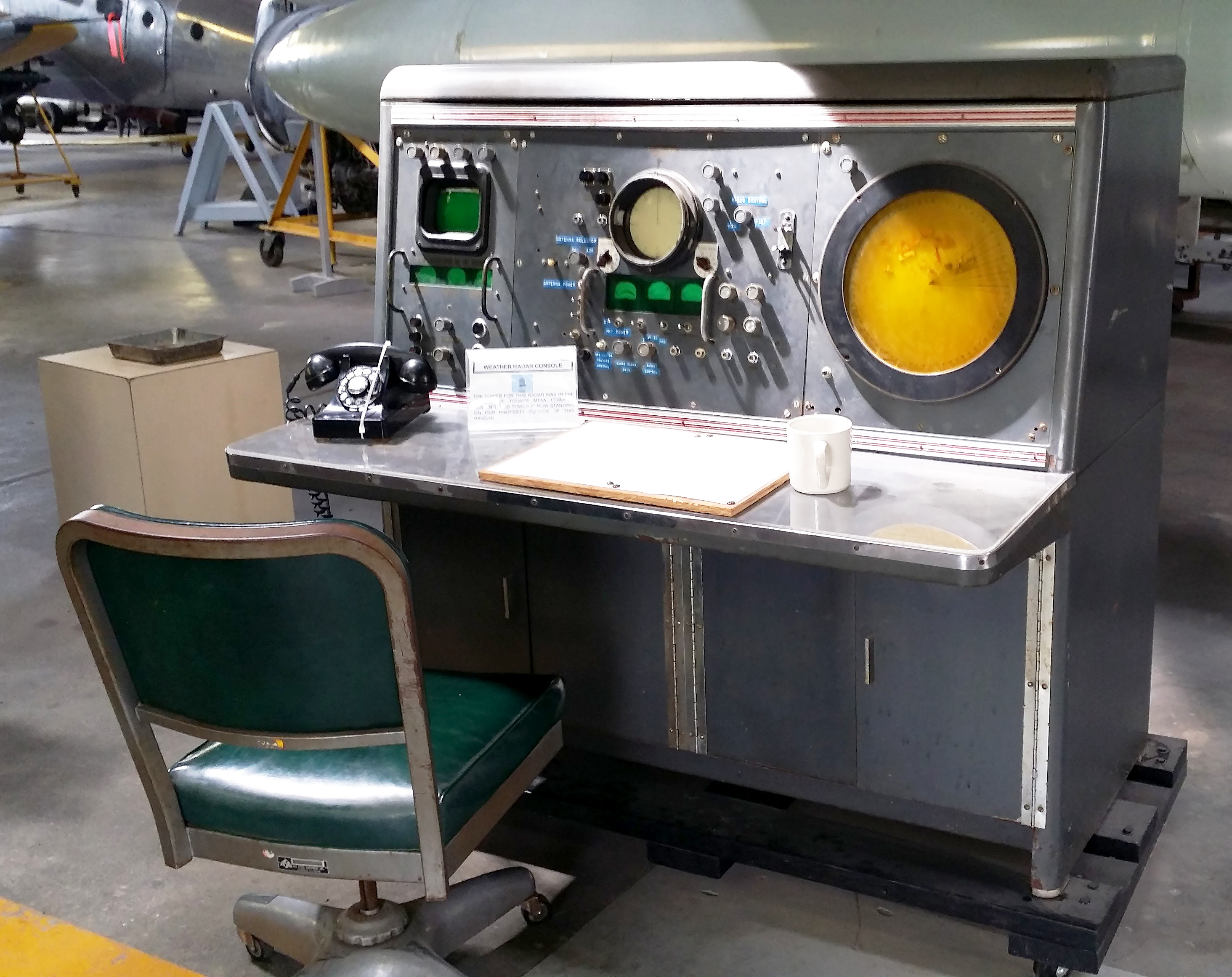
WSR-3 console

The WSR-1 used a panoramic display (PPI) placing weather echoes in azimuth/distance coordinates on a circular screen whose center represented the position of the radar, and also a linear oscilloscope (A-Scope) showing the intensity of the echoes according to their distance from the radar. Everything was mounted on a rack. The WSR-3 and WSR-4 used A-Scope displays and height/distance displays (RHI) which allows a vertical sectional view in a chosen direction. They were mounted next to each other on a console. The WSR-1A used the same displays but stacked vertically. From a technical point of view, the WSR-4 had a traveling-wave tube that improved the sensitivity compared to the WSR-3.

== Radar Sites ==
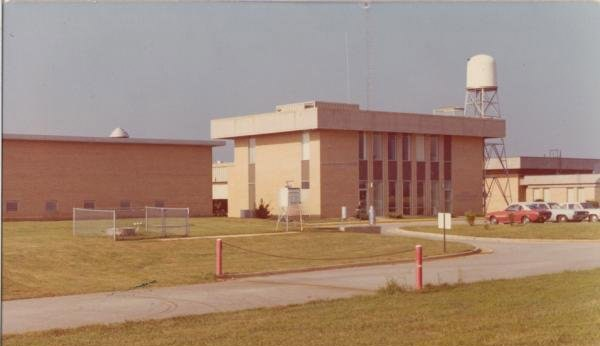
NWS office and WSR-3 radar Huntsville International Airport

The 82 radar sites of WSR1, 1A, 3 and 4 are listed below

WSR-1 and 1A sites

Location	Commissioned	Decommissioned	Replaced by
Baton Rouge, LA	August 16, 1955	1973?	
Burrwood, LA	1956	1960	WSR-4
Fort Worth, TX	April 21, 1954	April 1961	WSR-57
Hartford, CT	1955	1959	WSR-3
Dodge City, KS	June 13, 1954	July 25, 1963	WSR-3
Lubbock, TX	1954	August 1972	WSR-74C
Norfolk, NE	July 27, 1947	1976	WSR-74C
North Omaha, NE	1955	1977	WSR-74C
Oklahoma City, OK	March 1, 1955	1960	WSR-57
Philadelphia, PA	November 20, 1959	?	
Pittsburgh, PA	1952?	October 4, 1963	
Port Arthur, TX	July 15, 1955	?	
St. Louis, MO	June 1955	1960	WSR-57
Shreveport, LA	November 1955	1976	WSR-74C
Sioux Falls, SD	1956	1976?	WSR-74C
Springfield, MO	June 28, 1957	?	
Tampa, FL	1956	1960	WSR-57
Topeka, KS	1953	1957	WSR-3
Tulsa, OK	May 4, 1956	1976	WSR-74C
Waco, TX	April 28, 1955	1976	WSR-74C
Washington, DC	March 12, 1947	?	
Wichita, KS	June 1, 1947	June 5, 1956	WSR-3
Wichita Falls, TX	April 25, 1956 (Replaced a military APS-2F radar)	1977	WSR-74C
Worcester, MA	March 16, 1956	1976	WSR-74C

WSR-3 sites

Location	Commissioned	Decommissioned	Replaced by
Abilene, TX	25 March 1972	27 August 1977	WSR-74C
Albany, NY	12 November 1958	27 July 1977	WSR-74C
Astoria, OR	1 June 1959	1 November 1967	
Binghamton, NY	15 June 1959	8 March 1978	WSR-74S
Chicago/Midway, IL	19 April 1958	January 1963	WSR-57
Cleveland, OH	13 May 1957	WSR-74C	
Columbia, MO	August 1957	November 1977	WSR-74C
Columbus, OH	12 February 1959	19 January 1977	
Detroit, MI	1 May 1957	12 September 1962	WSR-57
Dodge City, KS	25 July 1963	25 July 1972	
Eureka, CA	1957	June 1972	Given to California State University in Humboldt
Flint, MI	15 November 1957	15 January 1978	
Fort Smith, AR	30 August 1960	29 December 1975	WSR-74C
Fort Wayne, IN	1957	12 March 1976	WSR-74C
Hartford, CT	29 April 1959	April 1977	WSR-74C
Hunstville, AL	October 1958	1977	WSR-74C

Location	Commissioned	Decommissioned	Replaced by
Indianapolis, IN	October 1959	September 1977	WSR-74C
Jackson, MS	1959	1969	WSR-57
Little Rock, AR	19 December en remplacement d'un AN/APS-2E militaire	19 April 1962	WSR-57
Macon, GA	21 April 1958	18 April 1977	WSR-74C
Madison, WI	29 March 1958	15 May 1979	WSR-74C
Memphis, TN	1957	?	
Meridian, MS	16 August 1959	2 November 1976	WSR-74C
Miami, FL	Durant la Seconde Guerre mondiale	?	
Montgomery, AL	October 1958	1971	WSR-74C in 1977
Muskegon, MI	9 May 1957	25 March 1976	WSR-74C
Nashville, TN	2 April 1957	31 October 1970	WSR-57
Richmond, VA	7 July 1958	October 1959	
Rochester, MN	September 1960	April 1976	WSR-74C
Scottbluff, MO	Summer 1969	1978	
Tatoosh Island, WA	1 October 1960	January 1964	
Topeka, KS	1957	1976	WSR-74C
Wichita, Kansas	5 June 1956	22 June 1960	WSR-57

WSR-4 sites

Location	Commissioned	Decommissioned	Replaced by
Burrwood, LA	1960	?	
Concordia, KS	1 June 1962	18 February 1977	WSR-74C
Savannah, GA	7 April 1960	1970	
