= AN/APS-2 =

WWII-era military aircraft surface search radar

The AN/APS-2, originally known as ASG (air-surface, model G), was a surface search radar developed by Philco originally for use in US Coast Guard blimps to detect German submarines. It proved better than several similar models then being built, and was ordered by the RAF Coastal Command where it was known as ASV Mark V. It was used primarily on British Liberator GR bombers, where they were instrumental in closing the Mid-Atlantic Gap and the subsequent destruction of the German U-boat fleet in May/June 1943.

In the post-war era, many APS-2s were passed off for other services. Some of the USA's first weather radars were modified APS-2F radars.

In accordance with the Joint Electronics Type Designation System (JETDS), the "AN/APS-2" designation represents the second design of an Army-Navy airborne electronic device for search radar equipment. The JETDS system also now is used to name all Department of Defense electronic systems.

== Radar history ==
The US Weather Bureau (precursor to the National Weather Service) obtained 25 AN/APS-2F aircraft radars from the Navy in 1946. The radars were modified for meteorological use and put into operation at a rate of about five per year. The modifications were performed by the Weather Bureau, which called the modified APS-2F radars WSR-1s, -1As, -3s, and -4s.

Three particularly severe weather events in the spring of 1953 led to the formation of a Texas Tornado Warning Network. Major cities in Texas were approached for funds (some from the private sector and some from the public sector) to modify and install the APS-2Fs (as models WSR-1, -1A, -3, and -4) in Weather Bureau offices. The Weather Bureau agreed to operate and maintain the radars and provide warnings to the public when confirmed sightings were made. Formation of the network began at a kickoff meeting held on June 24, 1953. Approximately six years were required before the network attained full strength; about 17 radars were modified and installed under this joint effort by local government, state, and federal agencies, and a university.

The modified APS-2F at Texas A&M University, although not formally a part of the Texas Tornado Warning Network, was used at least once for warning purposes, on April 5, 1956.

After 1956, the task of modifying the APS-2F radars so they could be fielded as WSR-1s, -1As, -3s, and -4s was transferred to Weather Bureau headquarters, which had to relocate some antennas that had been mounted in locations where they were difficult to maintain. At the height of the program in April 1975, 82 of the WSR-1s, -1As, -3s, and -4s were operational. A few were replaced by the WSR-57, but most continued in service until replaced by the WSR-74C over an extended period from 1976 to 1980. None are in service today.

== Radar properties ==
- The radar used a wavelength of about 10 cm. This corresponds to an operating frequency of 3.3 GHz. This frequency is in the S band, which is also used by today's weather radar network.
- Dish diameter after modification was 6 feet (1.8 m)
- The AN/APS-2F weighed 280 pounds (130 kg) (before modification).

These radars had S-band wavelengths, so attenuation by rain was almost entirely avoided; however, detection of light rain and snow was minimal due to system performance limitations.

Modifications made to the radars included a new antenna pedestal to support a 6 ft (1.8 m) parabolic reflector, a rack-mounted PPI and A-scope, and a fiberglass radome to protect the antenna and allow operation without wind and ice loading.

== See also ==
- List of radars
- List of military electronics of the United States
