= Aviation Building =

Disestablished building in Miami, Florida

Coordinates: 25.8063°N 80.2422°W

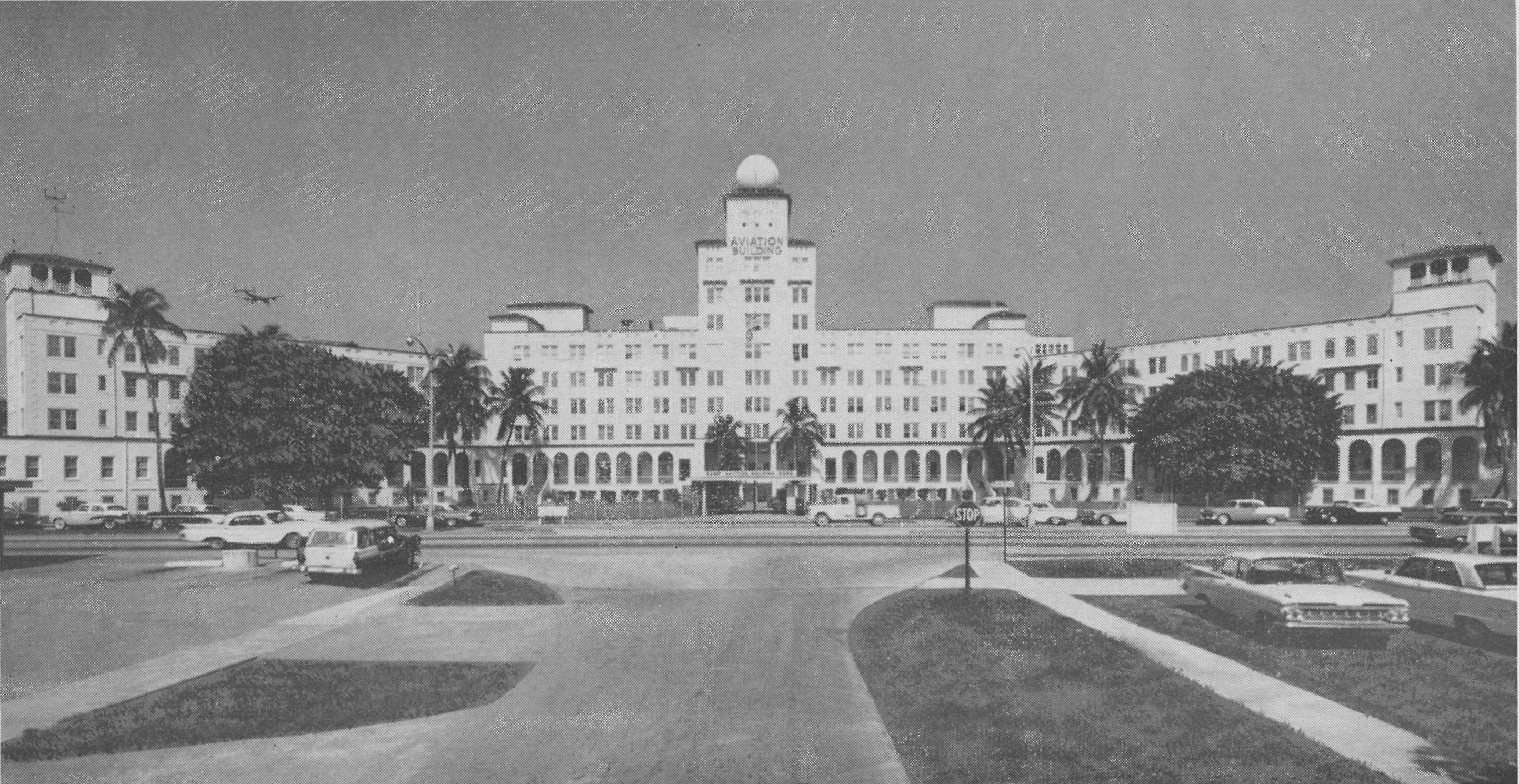
The Aviation Building with a WSR-57 radar antenna on top.

The Aviation Building, also known as the Fritz Hotel, was a building located in unincorporated Dade County, Florida, United States. The building stood from 1927 to the mid-1970s when it was torn down and replaced. The address of the building was 3240 NW 27th Avenue which was 16 blocks east of the east end of runway 9/27 at Miami International Airport. The building was used for a number of purposes, none of which was a hotel.

== History ==
=== Construction ===
Construction for the Fritz Hotel began in 1925 by M.R. Harrison Construction Company. By 1927 three quarters of the construction was completed, but halted due to the Great Depression. The unfinished building was never used as a hotel. The building served many other purposes throughout its 50-year history as the owners repurposed the hotel's shell. After being unoccupied for 10 years, the building was rented out to small businesses. The owners would complete various building components in accordance with various manufacturers' specifications.

=== Hen House ===
The first use of the building was a temporary hen house where it held up to 60,000 hens. Because such an expensive building was used for hens, it was often nicknamed the "Million Dollar Hen House".

=== Embry-Riddle ===
In November 1940 the Technical Division of Embry-Riddle School of Aviation (now Embry-Riddle Aeronautical University) moved into the south wing of the building. The Technical Division handled aircraft mechanic training. By 1941 Embry-Riddle had acquired the entire building, filled it with offices, classrooms, workshops, military barracks, a cafeteria, library, and clinic, and renamed it the Aviation Building. In April 1965 the school was packed into trucks and moved to Daytona Beach, Florida, overnight.

=== National Weather Service ===
On June 1, 1958, the National Weather Service (NWS) Forecast Office of Miami, Florida, moved into part of the building, while Embry-Riddle remained there. A WSR-57 network radar was installed on top of the building on June 26, 1959. The NWS moved its offices out of the building on December 23, 1964.

=== Clothing factory ===
After the NWS and Embry-Riddle moved out the building remained vacant for a few years. In the late 1960s the building was used as a clothing factory. Lorenzo Blanco owned the structure.

=== Removal ===
The building was demolished in May 1971 and replaced with a county juvenile detention center and courthouse.
