= AN/APQ-13 =

USAAF WWII-era aircraft bombsight radar

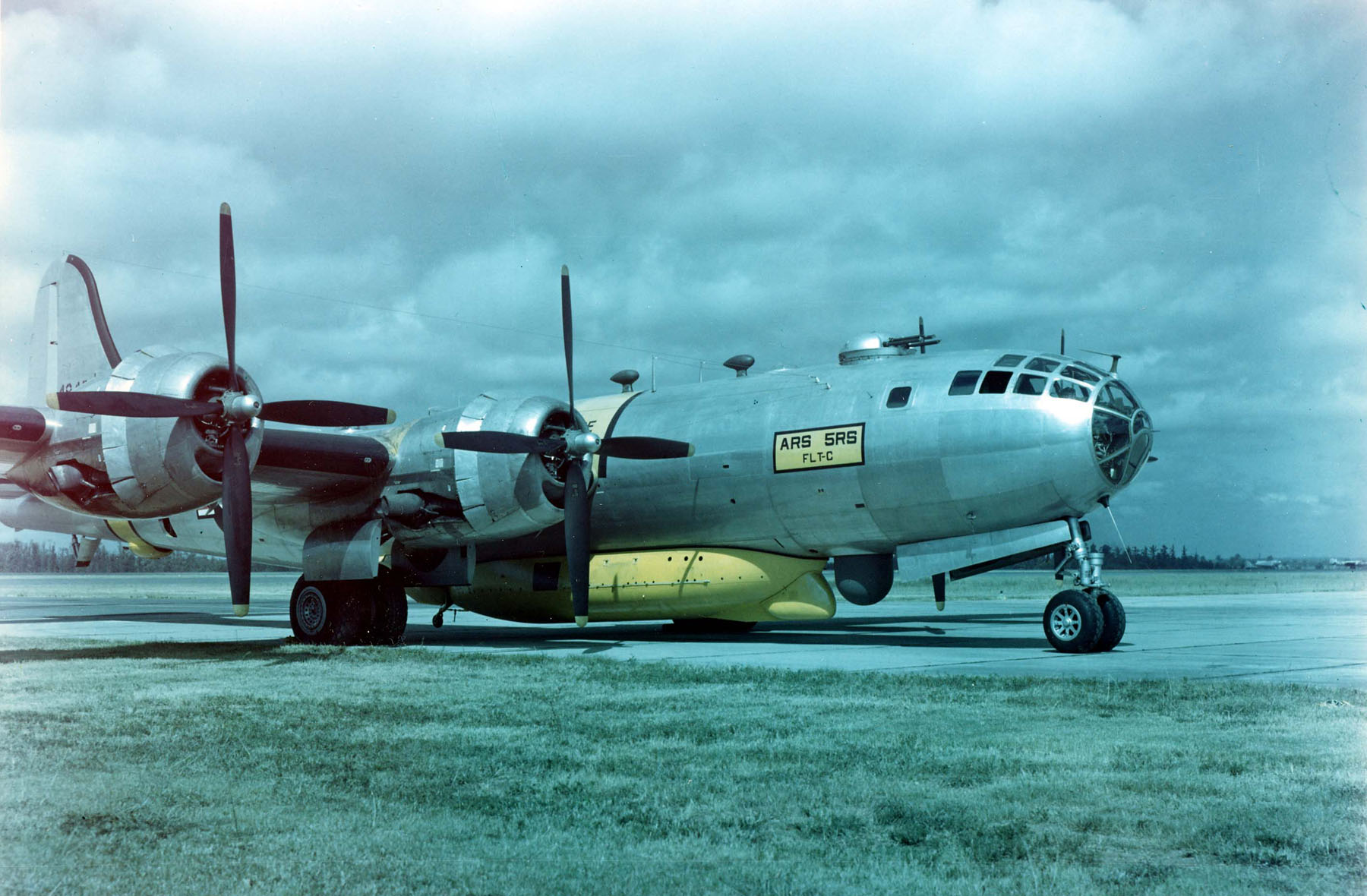
Boeing SB-29 "Super Dumbo" with AN/APQ-13 radome between the nose landing gear and the airborne lifeboat

The AN/APQ-13 radar was an American ground scanning radar developed by Bell Laboratories, Western Electric, and MIT as an improved model of the airborne H2X radar, itself developed from the first ground scanning radar, the British H2S radar. It was used on B-29s during World War II in the Pacific theater for high altitude area bombing, search and navigation. Computation for bombing could be performed by an impact predictor. A range unit permitted a high degree of accuracy in locating beacons. The radome was carried on the aircraft belly between the bomb bays and was partially retractable on early models. The radar operated at a frequency of 9375 ± 45 megahertz and used a superheterodyne receiver.

In accordance with the Joint Electronics Type Designation System (JETDS), the "AN/APQ-13" designation represents the 13th design of an Army-Navy airborne electronic device for radar special equipment. The JETDS system also now is used to name all Department of Defense electronic systems.

== Weather radar use ==
The AN/APQ-13 radar was the first military radar converted to civilian use as a weather warning radar. About 30 systems were converted, starting in late 1945. They were installed in the aircraft at military bases.

The last operational APQ-13 was removed from the Fort Sill, Oklahoma post weather station in October 1977 for display at what is now the National Museum of the United States Air Force. The museum intended to display it in its original configuration as a navigation and bombing radar, but would note the radar's much longer history as an operational weather radar.

The AN/APQ-13 weather radars were generally replaced by the AN/CPS-9, which was specifically designed as a weather radar.

== See also ==
- List of radars
- List of military electronics of the United States
