= Embry–Riddle Aeronautical University =

Private U.S. university system specializing in aviation and aerospace

- Type: Private university
- Established: 1926; 100 years ago
- Accreditation: SACS
- Academic affiliations: AITU; ORAU; Space-grant
- Endowment: $359.25 million (2025)
- President: P. Barry Butler
- Faculty: 2,639 full-time (2023)
- Students: 32,103 (2023–24)
- Location: Daytona Beach, Florida and Prescott, Arizona, United States; 29.18857°N 81.04871°W
- Campus: Daytona Beach: Small city, 289 acres (1.17 km^{2}); Prescott: Fringe town, 539 acres (2.18 km^{2})
- Campuses: Daytona Beach; Prescott
- Newspapers: The Avion; The Pioneer
- Colors: Unrivaled Blue, Stratus White, and Sunrise Yellow
- Nickname: Eagles
- Sporting affiliations: Daytona Beach: NCAA Division II (Sunshine State · PBC); Prescott: NAIA (Cal Pac)
- Mascot: Ernie the Eagle
- Website: erau.edu

Embry–Riddle Aeronautical University (ERAU) is a private university focused on aviation and aerospace programs based in Daytona Beach, Florida, and Prescott, Arizona, United States. It is the largest accredited university system specializing in aviation and aerospace. It has numerous online programs and academic programs offered at satellite locations.

Founded at Lunken Field in Cincinnati in 1926, it began as a regional school for pilots and aircraft mechanics. With the expansion and development of aviation and related space programs, the university enrolls over 32,000 undergraduate and graduate students across all campuses.

== History ==
On December 17, 1925, Talton Higbee Embry and John Paul Riddle founded the Embry–Riddle Company at Lunken Airport in Cincinnati, Ohio. In spring 1926, the company opened the Embry–Riddle School of Aviation. Following a merger with the Aviation Corporation (AVCO), the Embry–Riddle flying school was closed in 1930.

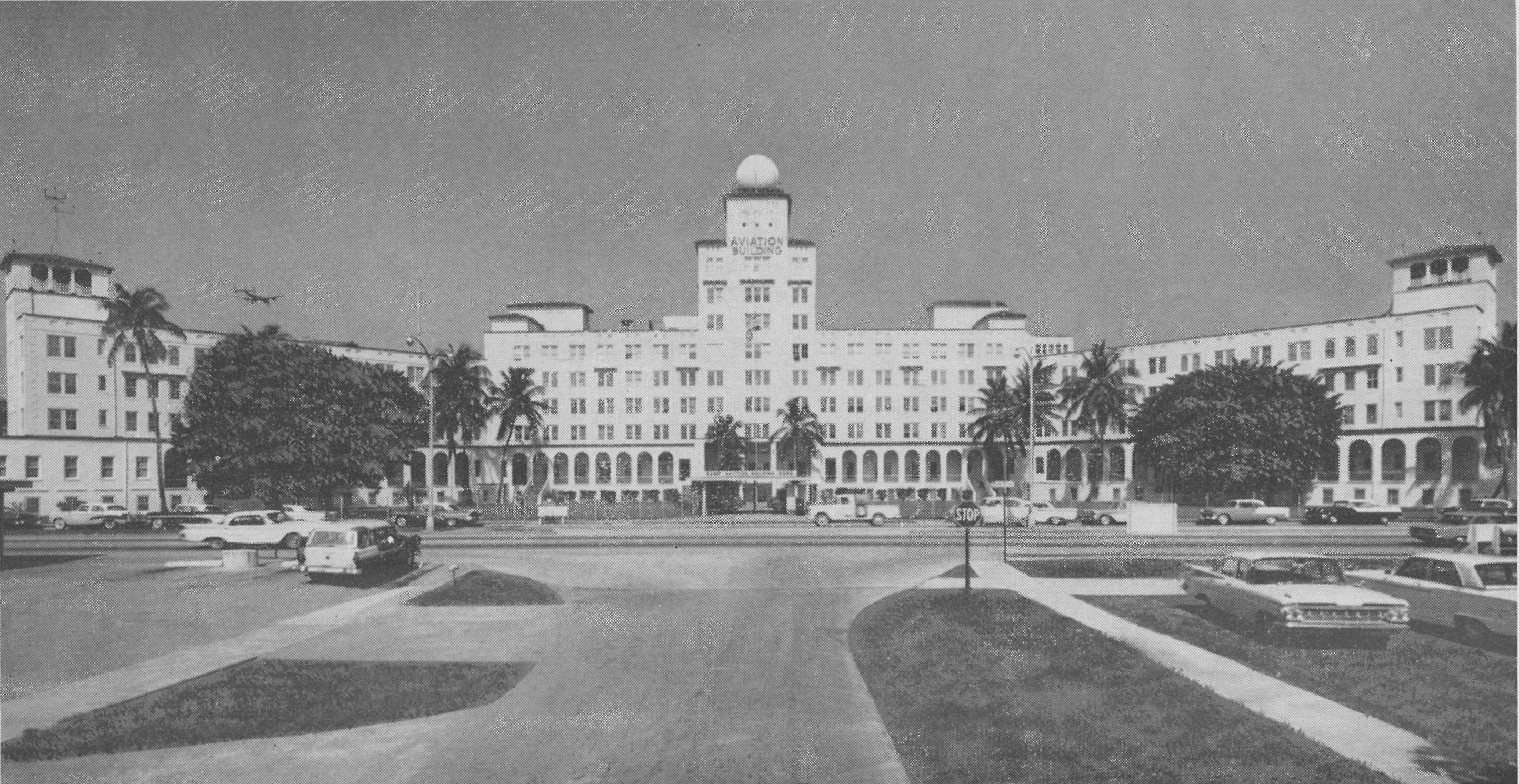
The Fritz Hotel in Dade County. Embry–Riddle occupied the building prior to moving to Daytona Beach, Florida.

In 1939, Riddle, John Graham McKay and wife Isabel re-established the school in Miami. Keeping the name, they partnered with the University of Miami to provide flight training under the Civilian Pilot Training Program, and rapidly increase the number of qualified pilots immediately preceding World War II. Alumni of this school included John F. Kennedy, who served in the United States Navy in the war, and was elected as President of the United States in 1960. Following rapid expansion, the school took over the former Fritz Hotel.

Embry–Riddle became a nonprofit in 1959. In advance of the announced closure of Tamiami Airport, where the Embry–Riddle Aeronautical Institute was conducting its flight operations, the school moved to Daytona Beach, Florida, in April 1965.

Having expanded its programs of study, Embry–Riddle was awarded university status in 1968. It took the name Embry–Riddle Aeronautical University in 1970. It started its international program the same year. In 1978 it opened a second residential campus in Prescott, Arizona.

== Academics ==
The non-profit university is accredited as a level VI institution by the Southern Association of Colleges and Schools to award degrees at the associate, bachelor, master's, and doctoral levels. The university's programs in aviation maintenance, air traffic management, applied meteorology, aeronautical science, aerospace and occupational safety, flight operations, and airport management are accredited by the Aviation Accreditation Board International (AABI).

The bachelor and master's programs in business are accredited by the Association of Collegiate Business Schools and Programs (ACBSP). All engineering programs are accredited by ABET.

The programs in aeronautics, air traffic management, applied meteorology, and aerospace studies are certified by the Federal Aviation Administration (FAA). In July 2014, the university became the nation's first FAA-approved training provider for student airline certification.

=== Professional programs ===
ERAU hosts a variety of aviation-focused short courses. These courses – ranging in topic from Unmanned Aircraft Systems to Aircraft Accident Investigation and Management – are tailored for professionals involved in the operations, management, and supervision of aviation organizations. The "Worldwide campus" offers courses either online, via video, or face-to-face globally.

The Embry–Riddle Prescott Campus is home to the Robertson Safety Institute (RSI); this is a center for research, development, short courses, and corporate outreach in safety education. The campus has resources including the Robertson Crash Lab, Aviation Safety and Security Archives, and access to advanced engineering, scientific, and forensic resources.

== Campuses ==
=== Daytona Beach, Florida ===
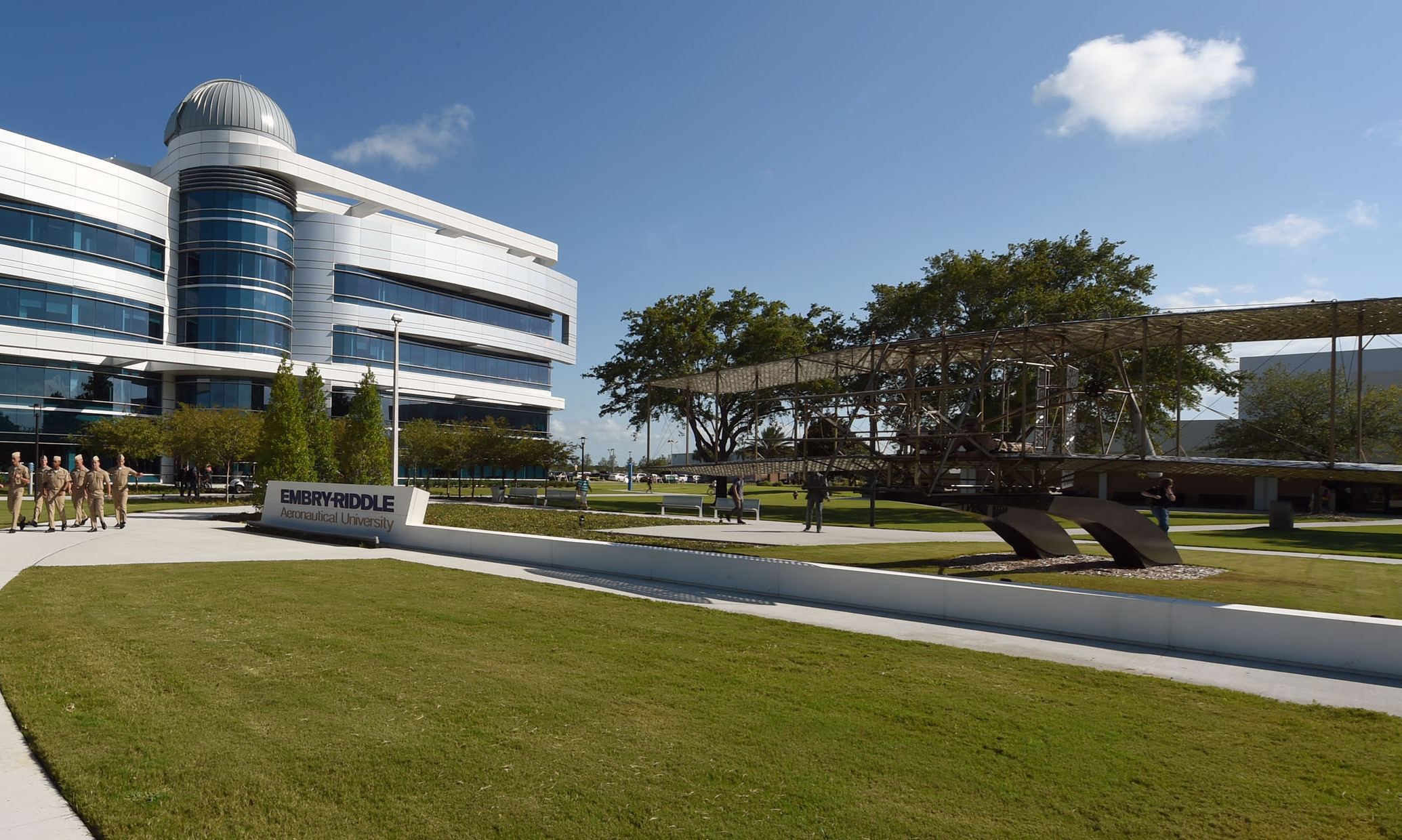
Daytona Beach campus, with its iconic replica of the Wright Flyer and the Arts & Sciences building with its observatory dome

Embry–Riddle's oldest residential campus (185-acre [0.75 km^{2}]) and academic headquarters has been in Daytona Beach, Florida, since 1965. Built adjacent to the Daytona Beach International Airport, the campus is connected to an aircraft ramp owned by the university for flight training. The main campus consists of an aviation complex, academic quad, and residence halls surrounding the student center and Jack R. Hunt Aviator Park. The campus has seven residence halls and one off-campus housing complex. Athletic facilities, the Brigadier General William W. Spruance ROTC Center, and the ICI Center are on the east side of campus.

This university's eastern campus serves 6,740 undergraduates and 781 graduate students from nearly 100 countries. All first-year students live on campus with sophomores, juniors, and seniors. Fifty-two majors are offered at this location for 2020–21. The engineering physics program at the Daytona Beach campus is among the largest undergraduate engineering physics program in the country and the only one specializing in aerospace.

The Daytona Beach campus has a fleet of 88 Cessna Skyhawks and 14 Diamond DA42-VI's. The ERAU Flying Club's three Tecnam P92 Echo Mk2s of the Eagles Flight Team are also parked on the ramp.

Embry–Riddle's Daytona Beach campus has one of the most extensive Reserve Officers' Training Corps (ROTC) programs in the United States and the nation's largest Air Force ROTC program.

=== Prescott, Arizona ===
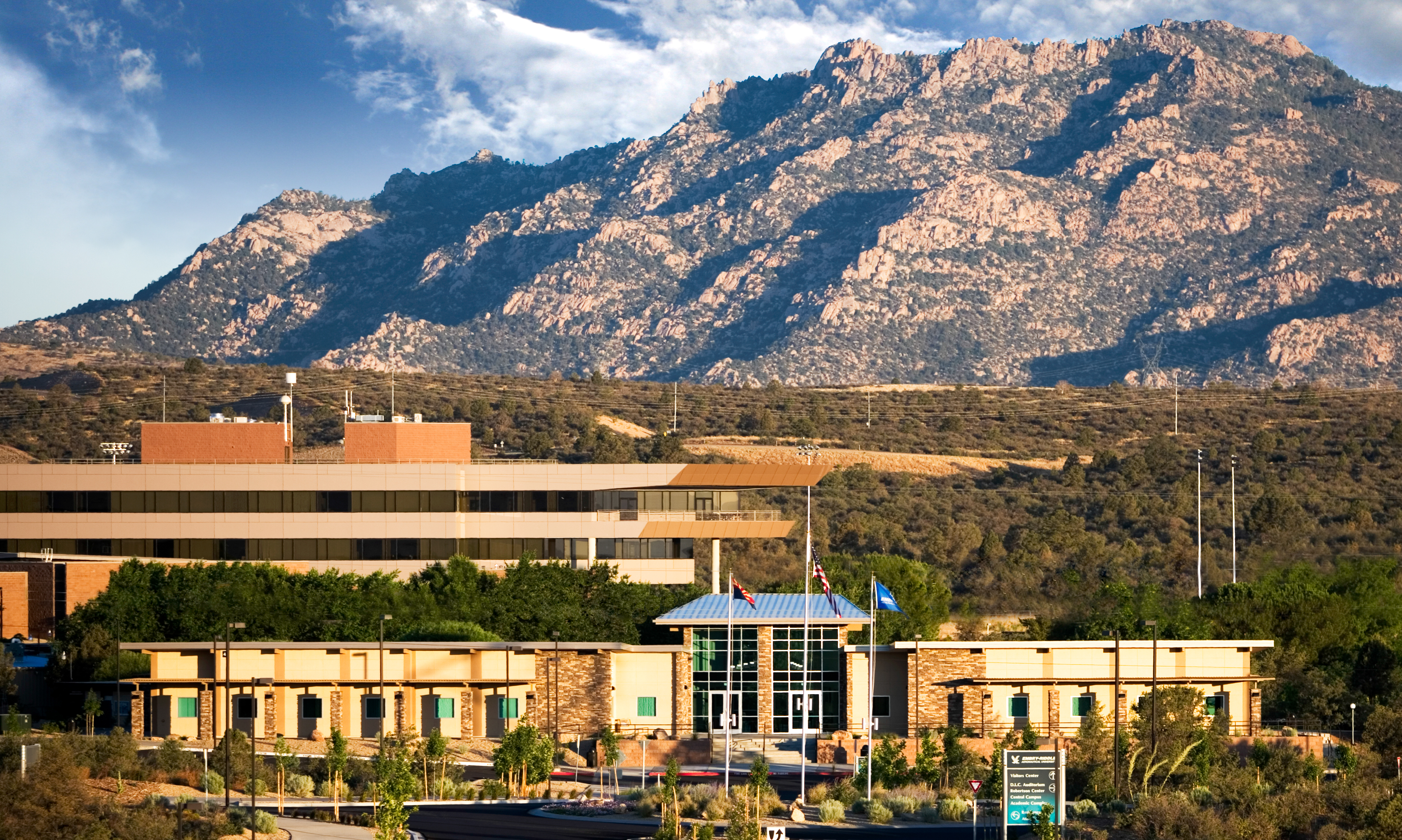
Prescott campus

Embry–Riddle Aeronautical University's campus in Prescott, Arizona, opened in 1978. The campus is 100 miles (160 km) north of Phoenix, Arizona. The campus has an enrollment of about 2,000 students and covers 539 acres (218 ha) of western terrain.

The flight training center is at nearby Ernest A. Love Field. Facilities at the Prescott Campus include the Aerospace Experimentation and Fabrication Building, a wind tunnel lab with one supersonic and four subsonic wind tunnels, the aviation safety center with an accident investigation lab, library, the 48,000 sq ft (4,500 m^{2}) academic complex, the engineering and technology center, chapel, dining hall, student union and residence halls. The Prescott Campus features four academic colleges and offers 19 bachelor's degrees and two master's degrees, as well as educational programs for youths, students, and working professionals.

The Prescott campus offers the only Global Security and Intelligence Studies program in the US.

The First Year Experience program is designed to help students transition to college on academic, social, and educational levels. Students in FYE housing are grouped together by major, when possible, and reside with a staff that is specially trained to handle first-year transitional issues. All first-year students who have graduated high school within 12 months of matriculation are required to live in university housing for their first full academic year. Exceptions are made for students who are over 21 years old, are married or have a dependent, have a permanent address in Yavapai County at time of application to ERAU, or students who have lived on-campus at another institution of higher education for at least two semesters. FYE students reside in the Mingus Mountain Complex or the Thumb Butte Complex and are required to participate in the Dining Services meal program.

Embry–Riddle's two Air Force Reserve Officer Training Corps (AFROTC) detachments form the largest university-based United States Air Force commissioning source in the United States. Embry–Riddle's AFROTC detachments also produce more commissioned officers and more pilots and other rated officers for the U.S. Air Force than any other institution in the United States except the United States Air Force Academy. The Army Reserve Officers' Training Corps (ROTC) also operates a large detachment on the Prescott campus.

The Prescott campus is home to the Golden Eagles Flight Team, which competes in the National Intercollegiate Flying Association. Prescott's Golden Eagles Flight Team has won the regional championship each year for the past 31 years, and the team is also thirteen-time National Champions winning in 1993, 1997, 1999, 2003, 2005, 2007, 2008, 2012, 2013, 2016, 2017, 2018 and 2022. With their twelve national wins, the team has also been inducted into the San Diego Air & Space Museum's Hall of Fame.

=== Worldwide campus ===
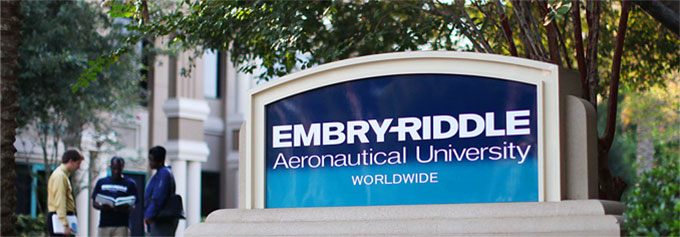
Sign outside worldwide headquarters in Florida

Embry–Riddle serves more than 22,000 students online and at 130 campuses, more than 100 on military bases and the option to take online courses. It offers 40 degree programs covering many areas in aviation, business, communication, computers, emergency services, engineering, human factors, management, safety, security, logistics, and unmanned systems. Classes are offered online, via video to a classroom or home, or face-to-face.

Embry–Riddle Worldwide campus was established in 1970 and became a network of more than 130 learning locations, including military bases. The largest worldwide location is Embry–Riddle Aeronautical University Asia campus in Singapore. Embry–Riddle Worldwide also provides a virtual "online campus". Facilities with aviation functions are available for students not able to attend a residential campus. Programs of study are offered at the undergraduate and graduate level (as well as certificate and non-degree), including the Master of Business Administration in Aviation (MBA-A),.

== Research ==
=== Daytona Beach ===
While rooted in aviation, research at Embry–Riddle's Daytona Beach Campus has expanded to include a diverse range of areas, including engineering, cyber and homeland security, human factors, modeling and simulation, and business. The same technologies and expertise faculty have developed and applied to aerospace and aviation related research, they now apply directly to other areas – space systems, high-performance vehicles, unmanned and autonomous systems, robotics, alternative and sustainable energy, medical human factors, commercial space operations and more.

The university is expanding its partnerships with industry in developing the Aerospace Research and Technology Park adjacent to the Daytona Beach campus. Embry–Riddle also manages the FAA NextGen Florida Test Bed, where technology is being developed that will support the nation's expanding air transportation needs. Research will contribute to reducing fuel consumption and associated emissions, improving situational awareness for pilots, and providing safer and more efficient passenger service.

In 2017, Embry–Riddle partnered with an Orlando, Florida, non-profit, FireSpring Fund, to aid five startups in their research and creation process. FireSpring awarded each startup $25,000 and Embry–Riddle offered each entrepreneurial support, seed funding, mentorship and a home base at the new university research park. The startups were: Embedded Control Designs LLC, Myers Devices LLC, Censys Technologies Corporation, Weintraus LLC, and Sensatek Propulsion Technology Inc. They researched and designed in the areas of: gas-turbine stability, drone data processing and communications, medical safety devices and spacecraft transportation.

=== Prescott ===
At the Prescott Campus, $60,000 in Eagle-Prize (E-Prize) Grants are available each year for student teams participating in collegiate, national or international design or research competitions. Teams that participate in high-stature competitions, have a diverse membership and demonstrate a great likelihood of success with sound methodology and clear business plans are more likely to receive funding.

Ignite Grants, part of Embry–Riddle's Quality Enhancement Plan, are available up to $48,000 annually for students wishing to participate in research and innovation under the tutelage of a faculty mentor.

== Athletics ==
=== Daytona Beach Eagles ===
The athletic teams of Embry–Riddle's Daytona Beach (main) campus are called the Eagles. The university is a member of the NCAA Division II ranks, primarily competing in the Sunshine State Conference (SSC) as a provisional member since the 2015–16 academic year for most their sports (achieving D-II full member status in 2017–18); while its men's and women's track and field teams compete in the Peach Belt Conference (PBC) as associate members.

ERAU–Daytona Beach competes in 22 intercollegiate varsity sports: Men's sports include baseball, basketball, cross country, golf, lacrosse, rowing, soccer, tennis, and track and field (indoor and outdoor); while women's sports include basketball, cross country, golf, lacrosse, rowing, soccer, softball, tennis, track and field (indoor and outdoor), and volleyball; and co-ed sports include cheerleading.

Prior to joining the NCAA and the SSC, the Eagles competed in the National Association of Intercollegiate Athletics (NAIA) as a founding member of the Sun Conference (formerly known as the Florida Sun Conference (FSC) until after the 2007–08 school year) from 1990–91 to 2014–15. The university announced in July 2014 that it had been accepted into the NCAA Division II membership process. During their time in the NAIA, the athletics program at the Daytona Beach Campus won the Sun Conference Commissioner's Cup for 15 consecutive years.

=== Prescott Eagles ===
The athletic teams of Embry–Riddle's Prescott campus are called the Eagles. The university is a member of the National Association of Intercollegiate Athletics (NAIA), primarily competing in the Great Southwest Athletic Conference (GSAC; formerly the Golden State Athletic Conference until after the 2023–24 school year) since the 2024–25 academic year. The Eagles previously competed in the California Pacific Conference (Cal Pac) from 2012–13 to 2023–24.

Embry–Riddle Prescott competes in 14 intercollegiate varsity sports: men's sports include baseball, basketball, cross country, golf, soccer, track and field (outdoor only) and wrestling; women's sports include basketball, cross country, golf, soccer, softball, track and field (outdoor only) and volleyball.

== Rankings ==
Academic rankings

Regional
- U.S. News & World Report: 2 (tie)

National
- Forbes: 417

Global
- THE: 801-1000

Embry-Riddle earned ten placements in the U.S. News & World Report 2027 Best Colleges rankings in the Regional Universities South category:

- Regional Universities South – Tie – 2nd
- Top Private Schools – Tie – 1st
- Best Value Schools – 29th
- Best Undergraduate Engineering Programs – Tie – 87th
  - Best Undergraduate Aerospace / Aeronautical / Astronautical Engineering Programs – Tie – 6th
- Computer Science – Tie – 173rd
- Best College for Veterans – 2nd
- Best Undergraduate Teaching – Tie – 9th
- Most Innovative Schools – 3rd
- Top Performers on Social Mobility – Tie – 100th

== The Avion ==
The Avion is the school's student magazine. It is published bi-monthly with circulation of 1,000 and distributed for free. The Avion is a division of the Embry-Riddle Student Government Association, which partially funds the organization. The magazine is run entirely by students, and most contributors are volunteers. The editor-in-chief is elected by a majority vote of the publication's staff and receives a 25% tuition voucher for their services. Executive Board members are also elected by the staff and each receives a 10% tuition voucher. The magazine was founded in 1969 as a traditional newspaper. In 2023, it launched a student-led news broadcast program.
