= Aggie Doppler Radar =

Weather radar at Texas A&M University

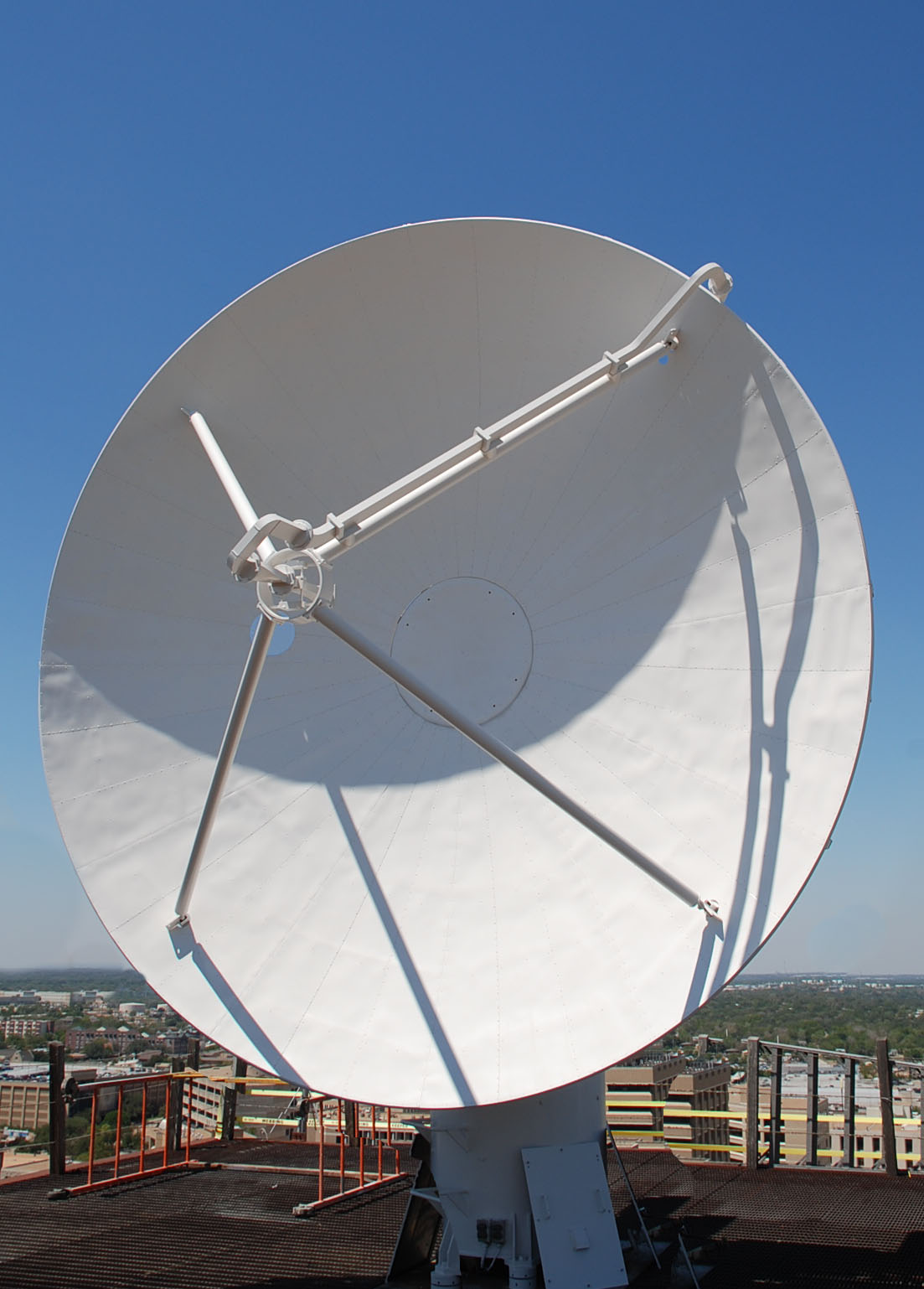
The current Aggie Doppler Radar dish

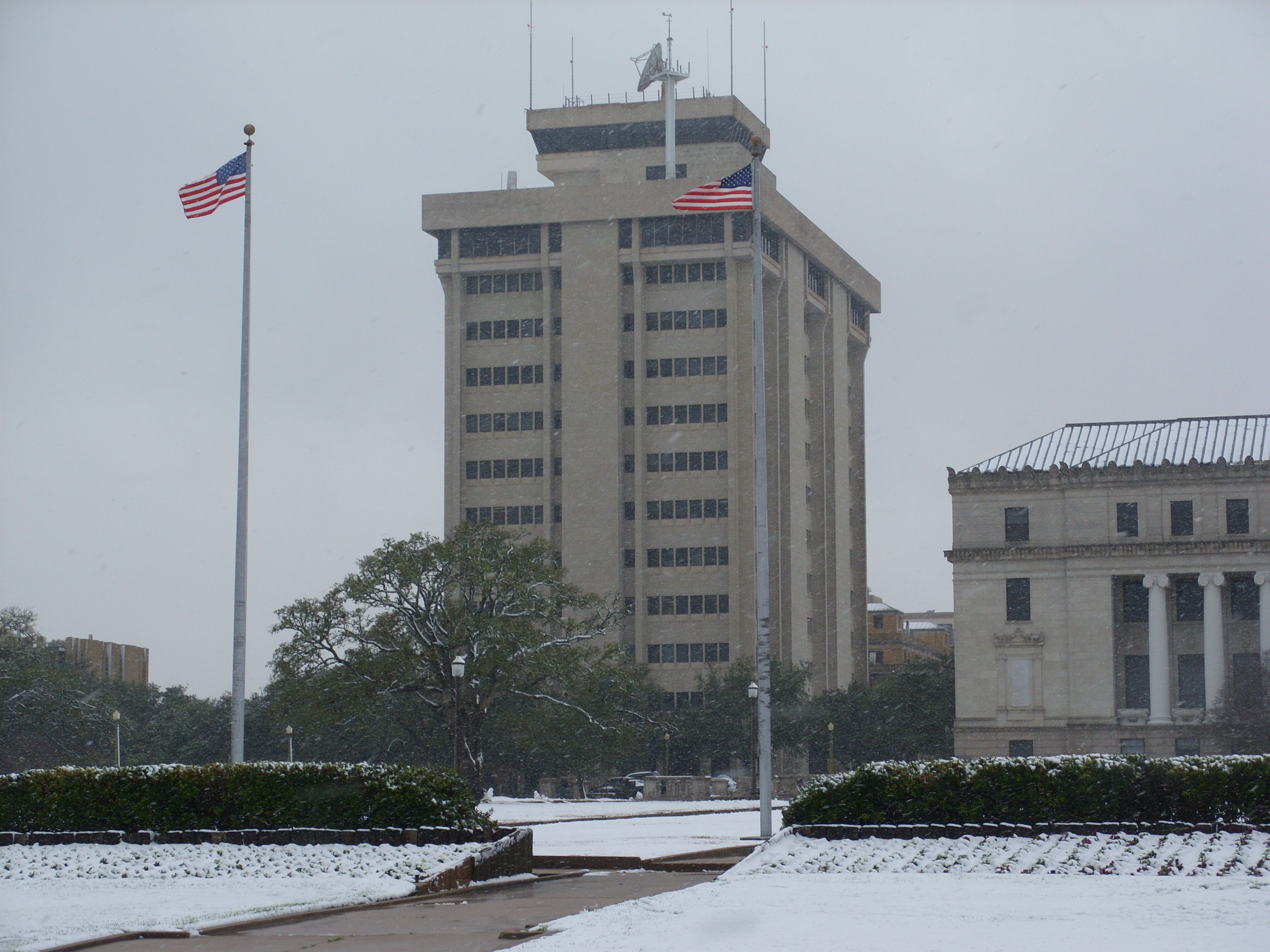
The Aggie Doppler Radar in operation atop the Eller O&M Building at Texas A&M University during a rare southern Texas snow storm on February 23, 2010

The Aggie Doppler Radar (ADRAD) (1973–2024) was a Doppler weather radar located on the roof of the Eller Oceanography & Meteorology Building on the Texas A&M University campus in College Station, Texas.

== History ==
The Meteorology department first began its study of convective storms with the use of a three cm wavelength radar in the early 1950s. In 1962, they upgraded to a ten cm, and in 1966, dual wavelength capability was added. After several modifications, the radar was placed on top of the newly completed Eller O&M Building in 1973. In 1992, the Aggie Doppler RADar was born with the installation of doppler capability. A final upgrade to the pedestal, removal of the side dishes, new processor, and work station occurred in 1997.

=== AN/CPS-9 ===
In the early 1950s, the department received a three cm weather radar, AN/CPS-9, from the US Air Force. Using this three cm radar, researchers studied mid-latitude mesoscale systems, severe storms, and land-falling cyclones. The AN/CPS-9 model was the first purpose-built weather radar.

=== April 5, 1956, tornado warning ===
"The modified APS-2F at Texas A&M University, although not formally a part of the Texas Tornado Warning Network, was used at least once for warning purposes (Bigler 1956). On 5 April 1956, a tornado that produced damage in Bryan and College Station, Texas, was detected by the Texas A&M University radar. At noon that day, the Weather Bureau Forecast Center at Kansas City, Missouri, had issued what we would today call a tornado watch for an area just to the north of Bryan. The Texas A&M University radar observed strong, tall, hook-shaped echoes with V-notch signatures after 1400 LT. At 1445 LT, Texas A&M University meteorologists called the Bryan Police Department and forecast that a tornado would touch down 30 min. later. Actual damage started at 1509 LT. Texas A&M University also warned the College Station Consolidated School System, which decided to keep the children in their school buildings instead of releasing them at the scheduled time of 1500 LT. This is probably the first warning based solely on interpretation of radar data and is a good example of effective interaction between warning meteorologists and the local community. Today, with improved warning dissemination methods, increased community preparedness, and better radar capabilities and coverage, it would be less likely that a research team would be issuing warnings to communities directly."

=== WSR/TAMU-1 and TAMU-ADRAD ===
In 1962, a longer wavelength radar, 10-cm, was constructed and designated WSR/TAMU-1. The TAMU-1 was updated in 1966 to allow dual wavelength operations. After several modifications, the radar was placed on top of the newly completed Eller O&M Building in 1973. More modifications were made in 1989 in anticipation of adding Doppler capability.

One of the storms that was tracked with this radar was Hurricane Alicia in 1983. As the storm made landfall, the Galveston NWS office lost its radar. The A&M radar tracked the remnants as they moved inland.

The integration of a Lassen Research PSP-32 processor in 1992 enabled Doppler capability. The new system was renamed the TAMU Aggie Doppler Radar (TAMU-ADRAD). This system was updated in 1993. A final upgrade to the pedestal, removal of the side dishes, new processor, and work station occurred in 1997. Starting in October 1998, live radar pictures from the ADRAD were available online during storms.

In 2016, ADRAD data became available for use by the National Weather Service offices and research teams through Gibson Ridge Analyst software (GRLevelX).

=== Replacement ===
ADRAD was taken down in late June 2024 and subsequently replaced by a Climavision Ranger X5 Doppler weather radar.

== Radar properties ==
The current antenna is a parabolic solid with a 4.88 metres (16.0 ft) diameter. It is situated 172.5 metres (566 ft) above mean sea level. It rotates at 2.5 RPM (15 degrees per second) or 4.5 RPM maximum (27 degrees per second). Elevation can be set from -1 to 90 degrees.

The transmitter is an Enterprise Electronics DWSR-88S, operating on a wavelength of 10.56 cm (corresponding to 2840 MHz). This frequency is in the S band, which is also used by the NEXRAD network. Peak power is 1 megawatt.

The new radar atop the Eller Oceanography and Meteorology building has a frequency in the X band with an 8 feet (2.4 m) antenna and 12 feet (3.7 m) radome. It has dual polarization, useful for distinguishing different types of meteorological targets.

== See also ==
Texas A&M University is also a partner in the Smart-R mobile research radars. See the following for more information - https://web.archive.org/web/20060418035945/http://www.met.tamu.edu/smartr/Smart-R.html
