= Arthur Hafford Cooke =

English academic administrator

Arthur Hafford Cooke, MBE (13 December 1912 – 31 July 1987) was an English physicist at the University of Oxford who served as Warden of New College, Oxford.

Cooke was educated at Wyggeston Grammar School and Christ Church, Oxford. He became a research lecturer at Christ Church in 1939. During World War II he conducted radar research for the Admiralty. He was a fellow of New College, Oxford, from 1946 to 1976; university lecturer in physics from 1944 to 1971; reader in physics from 1971 to 1976; and Warden of New College from 1976 to 1985.
