= AN/CPS-9 =

Meteorological radar

The AN/CPS-9 radar, the first radar specifically designed for meteorological use, was produced in the United States around 1949 and unveiled by the Air Weather Service (now the Air Force Weather Agency) in 1954.

In accordance with the Joint Electronics Type Designation System (JETDS), the "AN/CPS-9" designation represents the 9th design of an Army-Navy air transportable electronic device for search radar equipment. The JETDS system also now is used to name all Department of Defense electronic systems.

== AN/CPS-9 installations ==
The AN/CPS-9 was installed at military bases worldwide, as well as laboratories, such as the Air Force Cambridge Research Center, the Air Force Geophysics Laboratory (AFGL), the Phillips Laboratory (PL), and all weather training facilities and universities. Fifty-six CPS-9s were produced for all services combined, and less than 50 went into operational use in the Air Force; AN/APQ-13s had to be kept in operation at facilities that did not receive a CPS-9. The first operational CPS-9 was installed at Maxwell AFB, Alabama, on 20 June 1954; that radar remained operational for 30 years before finally being replaced on 14 July 1984 by a more modern radar, the AN/FPS-77 (Fuller 1990a). In 1966, the Air Weather Service still had 40 CPS-9s in operation. By 1974, the number was reduced to 11. None are in the operational inventory today.

Texas A&M University was one of the universities to receive a CPS-9. The Condon Report on Unidentified Flying Objects refers to Texas A&M research using the AN/CPS-9.

== Radar properties ==
- The AN/CPS-9 radar used an operating frequency in the X band. This corresponds to a wavelength of about 3 cm.
- These radars had a dish diameter of a little less than 8 feet.
- The radar beamwidth was 1 degree.
- The CPS-9 antenna required no radome, and the entire radio frequency (RF) transmitter–receiver package rode on the back of the antenna.

The CPS-9 became known for having good sensitivity. However, nearby rain would attenuate the signal from distant rain, making rainfall measurement less accurate. Hail may also have diminished the radar returns from storms, due to the way that X band radar energy reflects off hail. Despite this, researchers could identify storms strong enough to produce hail by looking for areas with those diminished returns.

== See also ==
- List of radars
- List of military electronics of the United States
