= WSR-74 =

Weather surveillance radar

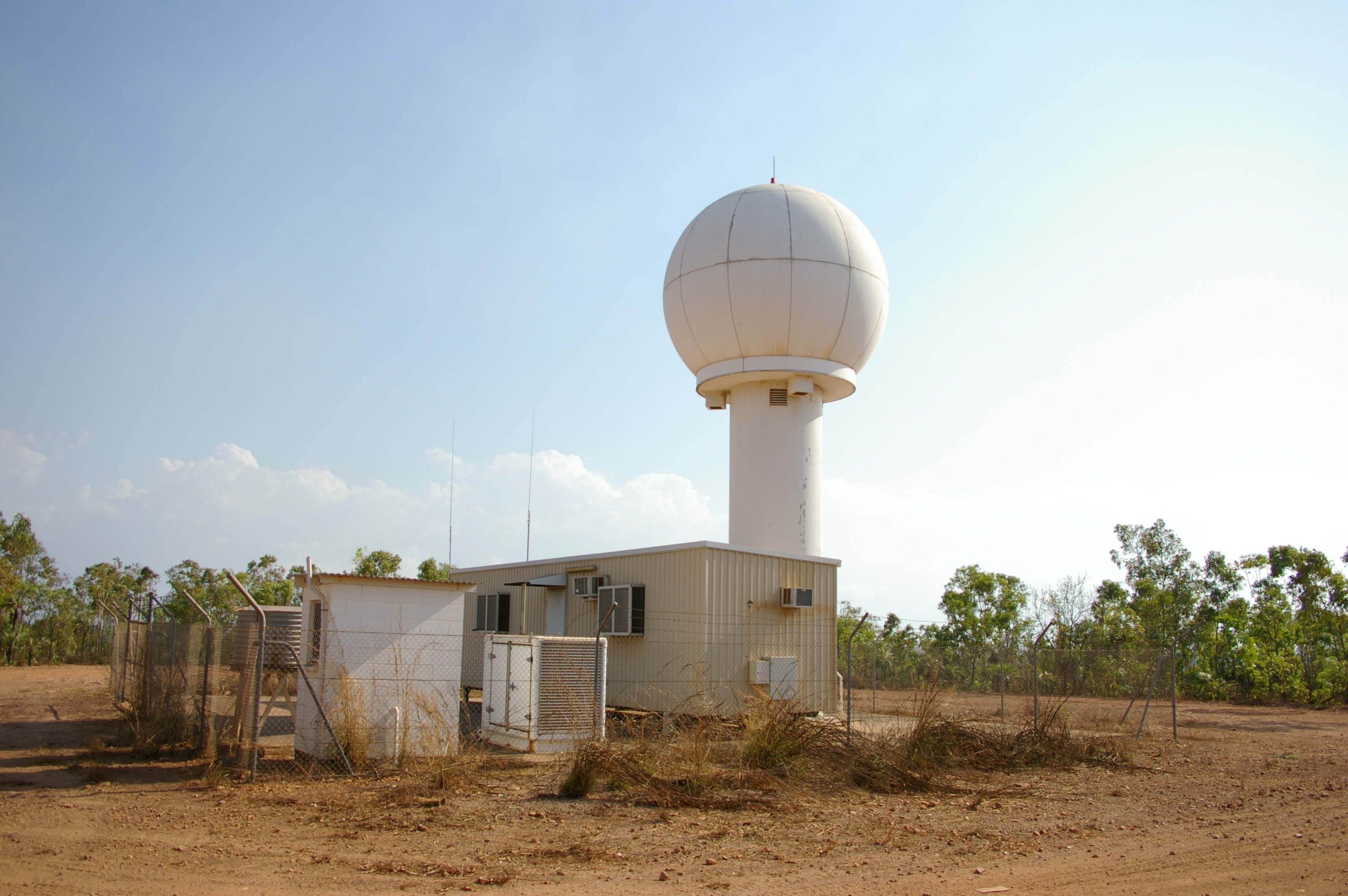
- WSR-74C Radar in Darwin, Northern Territory Australia
- Country of origin: United States
- Introduced: 1974
- No. built: 68 WSR-74C; 5 WSR-74S
- Type: Weather radar
- Frequency: 2890 MHz (WSR-74S S band); 5400 MHz (WSR-74C C band)
- PRF: 259 Hz (WSR-74C); 545 and 162 Hz (WSR-74S)
- Beamwidth: 1.6° (WSR-74C); 2° (WSR-74S)
- Pulsewidth: 3 μs (WSR-74C); 1 and 4 μs (WSR-74S)
- Range: 579 km
- Diameter: 2.6 m (8.5 ft) (WSR-74C); 3.7 m (12 ft) (WSR-74S)
- Precision: 0.9 km (0.56 mi) in range
- Power: 250 KW (WSR-74C); 500 KW (WSR-74S)

WSR-74 radars were Weather Surveillance Radars designed in 1974 for the National Weather Service. They were added to the existing network of the WSR-57 model to improve forecasts and severe weather warnings. Some have been sold to other countries like Australia, Greece, and Pakistan.

== Radar properties ==
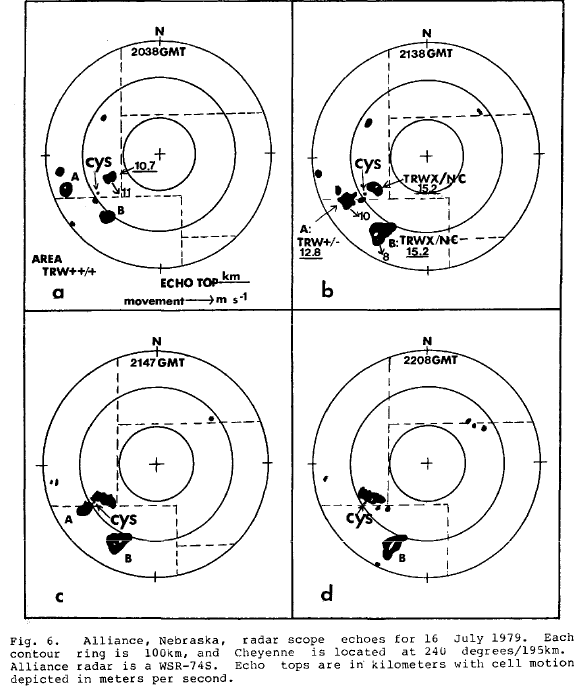
The supercell that produced an F3 tornado in Cheyenne, Wyoming, as seen on WSR-74S imagery

There are two types in the WSR-74 series, which are almost identical except for operating frequency. The WSR-74C (used for local warnings) operates in the C band, and the WSR-74S (used in the national network) operates in the S band (like the WSR-57 and the current WSR-88D). S band frequencies are better suited because they are not attenuated significantly in heavy rain while the C Band is strongly attenuated, and has a generally shorter maximum effective range.

The WSR-74C uses a wavelength of 5.4 cm. It also has a dish diameter of 8 feet, and a maximum range of 579 km (313 nm) as it was used only for reflectivities (see Doppler dilemma).

== History ==
The WSR-57 network was very spread out, with 66 radars to cover the entire country. There was little to no overlap in case one of these vacuum-tube radars went down for maintenance. The WSR-74 was introduced as a "gap filler", as well as an updated radar that, among other things, was transistor-based. In the early 1970s, Enterprise Electronics Corporation (EEC), based out of Enterprise, Alabama won the contract to design, manufacture, test, and deliver the entire WSR-74 radar network (both C and S-Band versions).

WSR-74C radars were generally local-use radars that didn't operate unless severe weather was expected, while WSR-74S radars were generally used to replace WSR-57 radars in the national weather surveillance network. When a network radar went down, a nearby local radar might have to supply updates like a network radar. NWS Lubbock received the first WSR-74C in August 1973 following widespread attention from the F5 Lubbock tornado of 1970.

128 of the WSR-57 and WSR-74 model radars were spread across the country as the National Weather Service's radar network until the 1990s. They were gradually replaced by the WSR-88D model (Weather Surveillance Radar - 1988, Doppler), constituting the NEXRAD network. The WSR-74 had served the NWS for two decades.

The last WSR-74C used by the NWS was located in Williston, ND, before being decommissioned at the end of 2012.

No WSR-74S's are in the NWS inventory today, having been replaced by the WSR-88D, but some of these radars are in commercial use.

== Radar sites in the US ==
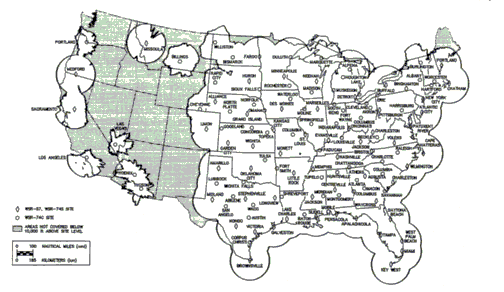
Circles showing the coverage of the WSR-57 and WSR-74 radars. Note the large gap over the western United States.

WSR-74 sites include the following two categories:

| WSR-74C Site | Commissioned | Decommissioned |
|---|---|---|
| Abilene, TX (ABI) | August 27, 1977 | April 30, 1997 |
| Akron, OH (CAK) | June 1, 1977 | November 15, 1995 |
| Albany, NY (ALB) | July 27, 1977 | November 2, 1995 |
| Alpena, MI (APN) | June 8, 1977 | December 9, 1996 |
| Atlanta, GA (ATL) Was atop the WSFO building at 3420 Norman Berry Drive | October 20, 1976 | February 1, 1996 |
| Augusta, GA (AGS) | July 1, 1976 | July 30, 1996 |
| Austin, TX (AUS) | April 9, 1976 | October 13, 1995 |
| Baton Rouge, LA (BTR) | October 20, 1978 | May 14, 1996 |
| Beckley, WV (BKW) | November 1, 1977 | January 12, 1996 |
| Billings, MT (BIL) | April 18, 1978 | May 30, 1996 |
| Bismarck, ND (BIS) | October 5, 1978 | February 28, 1996 |
| Burlington, VT (BTV) | Late 1977 | January 29, 1998 |
| Charlotte, NC (CLT) | February 28, 1978 | September 17, 1996 |
| Chattanooga, TN (CHA) | Early 1980s | June 10, 1998 |
| Cheyenne, WY (CYS) | September 15, 1976 | April 24, 1996 |
| Cleveland, OH (CLE) | August 4, 1976 Replaced a WSR-3. | November 15, 1995 |
| Columbia, MO (COU) | November 9, 1977 Replaced a WSR-3. | June 19, 1996 |
| Columbia, SC (CAE) | January 26, 1976 Replaced a WSR-1. | October 25, 1995 |
| Columbus, GA (CSG) | April 2, 1979 | April 3, 1996 |
| Columbus, OH (CMH) | June 9, 1977 Replaced a WSR-3. | December 1, 1995 |
| Concordia, KS (CNK) | February 18, 1977 Replaced a WSR-3. | November 9, 1995 |
| Corpus Christi, TX (CRP) | February 1, 1976 | March 10, 1997 |
| Duluth, MN (DLH) | 1977 | March 25, 1997 |
| Erie, PA (ERI) | August 30, 1977 | January 15, 2000? |
| Fort Smith, AR (FSM) | November 25, 1975 Replaced a WSR-3. | July 7, 1998 |
| Fort Wayne, IN (FWA) | March 12, 1976 Replaced a WSR-3. | July 8, 1998 |
| Goodland, KS (GLD) | June 6, 1978 Replaced a WSR-3. | October 25, 1995 |
| Harrisburg, PA (HAR) Atop the Federal Building | June 28, 1977 | January 12, 1996 |
| Hartford, CT (BDL) | April 1977 | November 2, 1995 |
| Houghton Lake, MI (HTL) | February 1, 1977 | December 9, 1996 |
| Huntsville, AL (HSV) (Doppler capability after July 1991) | 1977. Replaced a WSR-3. | December 15, 1999? Now the ARMOR radar, still used by Local Media/NWS. |
| Indianapolis, IN (IND) | September 28, 1977 | February 28, 1996 |
| Las Vegas, NV (LAS) | 1976 | September 1, 1995 |
| Los Angeles, CA (LAX) On top of the Federal Building in Westwood to this day. | | May 15, 1995 |
| Louisville, KY (SDF) | April or May 1978 | July 19, 1994 |
| Lubbock, TX (LBB) | August 1973 | April 3, 1996 |
| Macon, GA (MCN) | April 18, 1977 | April 3, 1996 |
| Madison, WI (MSN) At Madison Airport. | June 19, 1979 Replaced a WSR-3 | May 7, 1996 |
| Marquette, MI (MQT) | | July 16, 1996 |
| Meridian, MS (MEI) | November 2, 1976 | December 26, 1996 |
| Mobile, AL (MOB) | | October 12, 1995 |
| Moline, IL (MLI) | August 30, 1977 | January 19, 1996 |
| Montgomery, AL (MGM) (Doppler capability after 1982) | 1977 | June 4, 1996 |
| Muskegon, MI (MKG) | March 25, 1976 | August 13, 1996 |
| Norfolk, NE (OFK) | May 14, 1976 | March 25, 1997 |
| North Platte, NE (LBF) | | November 27, 1996 |
| Omaha, NE (OVN) | 1977 | July 10, 1996 |
| Paducah, KY (PAH) At the Paducah Airport. | 1984 | February 23, 1996 |
| Phoenix, AZ (PHX) | | August 15, 1994 |
| Portland, OR (PDX) | | January 30, 1996 |
| Raleigh, NC (RDU) | May 19, 1977 | December 22, 1995 |
| Rapid City, SD (RAP) | | November 4, 1996 |
| Rochester, MN (RST) | April 1976 | January 9, 1997 |
| San Angelo, TX (SJT) | October 1977 | April 22, 1997 |
| Savannah, GA (SAV) | November 15, 1982 | February 11, 1997 |
| Shreveport, LA (SHV) | June 1976 | June 5, 1996 |
| Sioux Falls, SD (FSD) | 1976 | October 4, 1996 |
| South Bend, IN (SBN) | October 22, 1982 | July 8, 1998 |
| Springfield, IL (SPI) | October 16, 1980 | July 30, 1996 |
| Topeka, KS (TOP) | 1976 | November 2, 1995 |
| Tucson, AZ (TUS) | January 1983 | March 14, 1996 |
| Tulsa, OK (TUL) | March 12, 1976 | April 5, 1995 |
| Tupelo, MS (TUP) | April 1, 1983 | December 6, 1995 |
| Waco, TX (ACT) | November 8, 1976 | September 13, 1995 |
| Waterloo, IA (ALO) | November 19, 1976 | January 17, 1997 |
| Wichita Falls, TX (SPS) | February 5, 1977 | December 26, 1996 |
| Williston, ND (ISN) | February 21, 1978 | December 31, 2012 |
| Worcester, MA (ORH) | July 2, 1976 | April 5, 1995 |

| WSR-74S Site | Commissioned | Decommissioned |
|---|---|---|
| Alliance, NE (AIA) | June 10, 1977 | January 17, 1997 |
| Binghamton, NY (BGM) | March 8, 1978 | September 26, 1995 |
| Charleston, WV (CRW) WSR-74S providing local coverage | May 16, 1977 | January 12, 1996 |
| Chatham, MA (CHH) | May 6, 1983 | April 5, 1995 |
| Detroit, MI (DTW) | March 9, 1984 Replaced a WSR-57. | November 9, 1995 |
| Fargo, ND (FAR) | February 1, 1978 Was a WSR-74C from Oct. 9, 1976 to Nov. 27, 1977 | November 27, 1996 |
| Jackson, KY (JKL); WSR-74S providing local coverage | April 1, 1981 | July 1, 1997 |
| Key West, FL (EYW) | May 9, 1983 Replaced a WSR-57. | October 20, 1998 |
| Longview, TX (GGG) | March 1, 1978 | March 14, 1996 |
| Marseilles, IL (MMO) (Doppler capability) | November 1, 1974. Replaced a WSR-57 at Chicago. | January 19, 1996 |
| Memphis, TN (MEG) At East Memphis/Agricenter site | January 1986. Replaced a WSR-57. | June 21, 1995 |
| Patuxent River, MD (NHK) At Patuxent River NAS | Early 1980s. Replaced a WSR-57 at Washington, DC. | November 17, 1995 |
| Portland, ME (PWM) | March 5, 1985 Replaced a WSR-57. | September 13, 1995 |
| San Juan, Puerto Rico (SJU) WSR-74S providing local coverage | | February 26, 1999 |
| Volens, VA (VQN/7VM) | April 12, 1977 | December 1, 1995 |
| West Palm Beach, FL (PBI) WSR-74S providing local coverage. Became part of the national network after the WSR-57 at Miami was destroyed in Hurricane Andrew. | December 17, 1980 | October 13, 1995 |
