= WSR-57 =

Weather radar used by the U.S. Weather Bureau

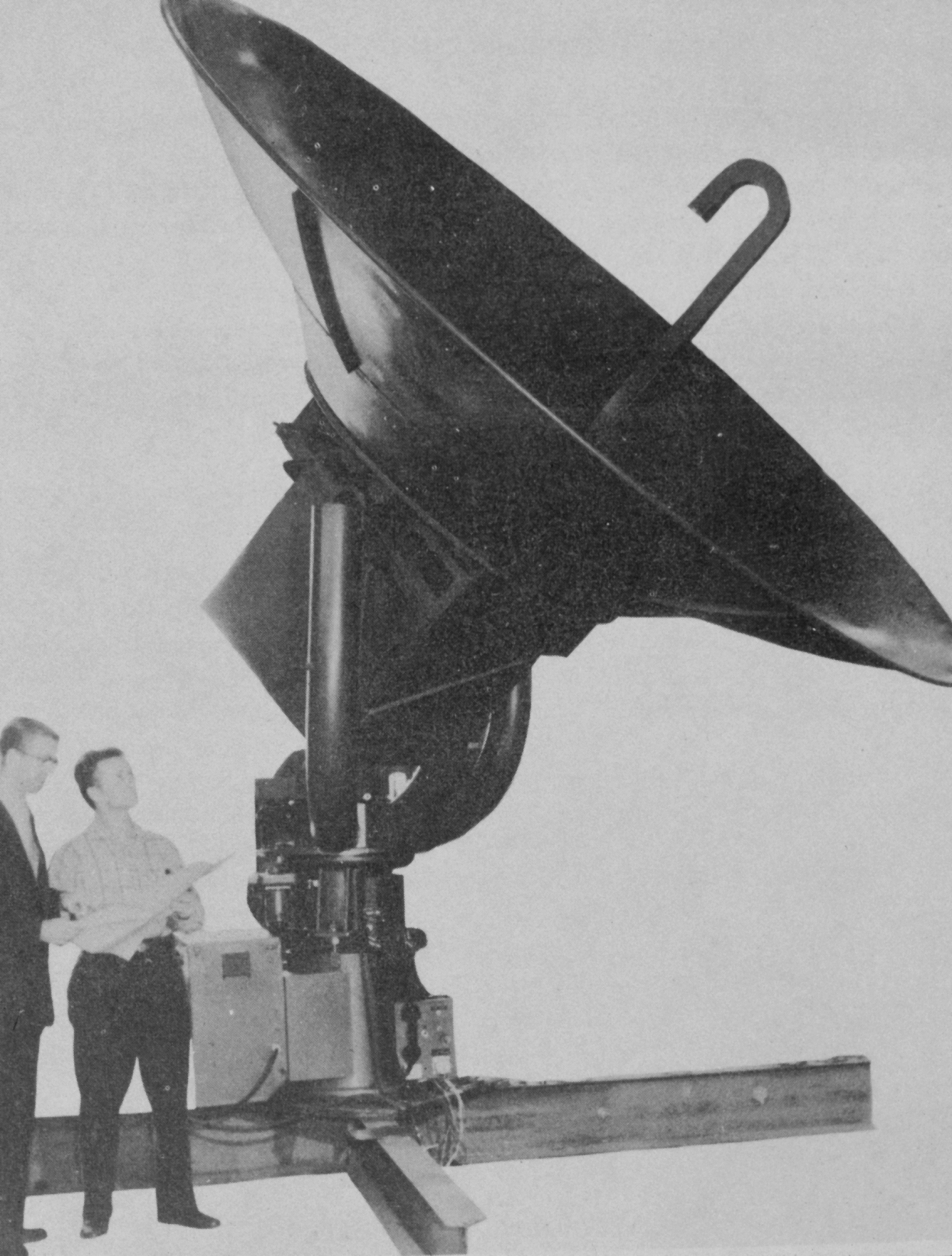
- WSR-57 radar antenna
- Country of origin: United States
- Designer: Dewey Soltow
- Introduced: 1957
- Type: Weather radar
- Frequency: 2,890 MHz (0.104 m) - S band
- PRF: 164 Hz (long range) or 545 Hz (short range)
- Beamwidth: 2°
- Pulsewidth: 0.5 or 4 μs
- Range: 494 to 171 nmi (915 to 317 km; 568 to 197 mi)
- Diameter: 3.66 m (12.0 ft)
- Precision: 0.15 km (0.093 mi) or 1.2 km (0.75 mi) in range
- Power: 410 KW
- Other names: AN/FPS-41

WSR-57 radars were the primary weather surveillance radar used by the United States for over 35 years. The National Weather Service operated a network of this model radar across the country, watching for severe weather.

== History ==
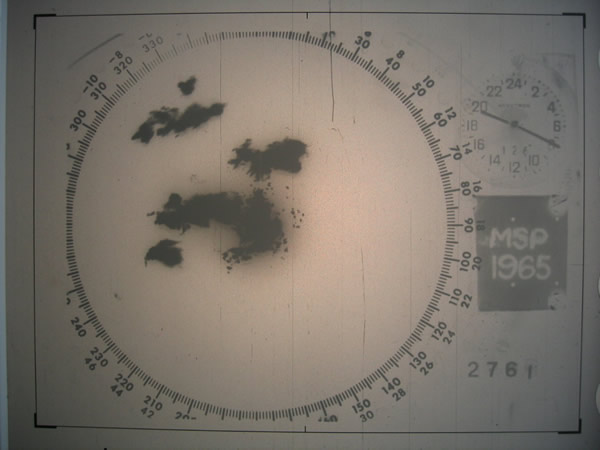
Radar image of tornado-producing supercells over Minneapolis, 1965

The WSR-57 (Weather Surveillance Radar – 1957) was the first 'modern' weather radar. Initially commissioned at the Miami Hurricane Forecast Center, the WSR-57 was installed in other parts of the Contiguous United States (CONUS). The WSR-57 was the first generation of radars designed expressly for a national warning network.

The WSR-57 was designed in 1957 by Dewey Soltow using World War II technology, using modified versions of those used by United States Navy aircraft. In accordance with the Joint Electronics Type Designation System, it was designated AN/FPS-41, as the 41st design of an Army-Navy fixed radar(pulsed) electronic device for searching. It provided only coarse reflectivity data and no velocity data, which made it extremely difficult to predict tornadoes. Weather systems were traced across the radar screen using grease pencils. Forecasters had to manually turn a crank to adjust the radar's scan elevation, and needed considerable skill to judge the intensity of storms based on green blotches on the radar scope.

The National Oceanic and Atmospheric Administration (NOAA) has pictures of the Charleston, SC, WSR-57 radar image of the 1989 Hurricane Hugo. A WSR-57 dish, located on the roof of the National Hurricane Center (NHC), was blown away by Hurricane Andrew. The NHC report on Hurricane Andrew shows its last radar image, as well as images from nearby WSR-88D radars.

As the network of WSR-57 radars aged, some were replaced with WSR-74S models of similar performance but with better reliability. WSR-57 operators sometimes had to scramble for spare parts no longer manufactured in this country. 128 of the WSR-57 and WSR-74 model radars were spread across the country as the National Weather Service's radar network until the 1990s. The WSR-57 radars were gradually replaced by the Weather Surveillance Radar - 1988, Doppler, WSR-88D, which NOAA named the NEXRAD network. The last WSR-57 radar in the United States was decommissioned on December 2, 1996.

== Radar properties ==
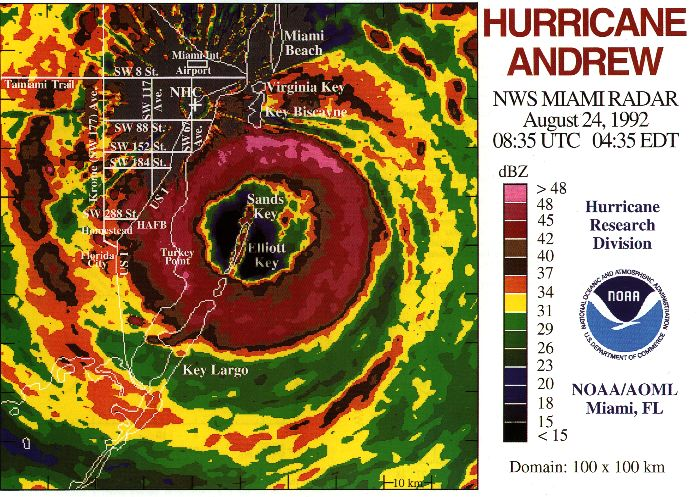
The last image from NWS Miami's WSR-57 at the National Hurricane Center, taken just moments before the radar was blown off its mounts by Hurricane Andrew.

- Operates on a wavelength of 10.3 cm (2,900 MHz), in the S band, which is also used by today's weather radar network.
- WSR-57 radars had the following statistics:
  - Dish diameter: 12 feet (3.7 m)
  - Power output: 410,000 watts
  - Maximum range: 494 to 171 nmi (915 to 317 km; 568 to 197 mi) depending on Pulse-repetition frequency (PRF) used

== Radar sites ==
The 66 former sites of the WSR-57 include the following:

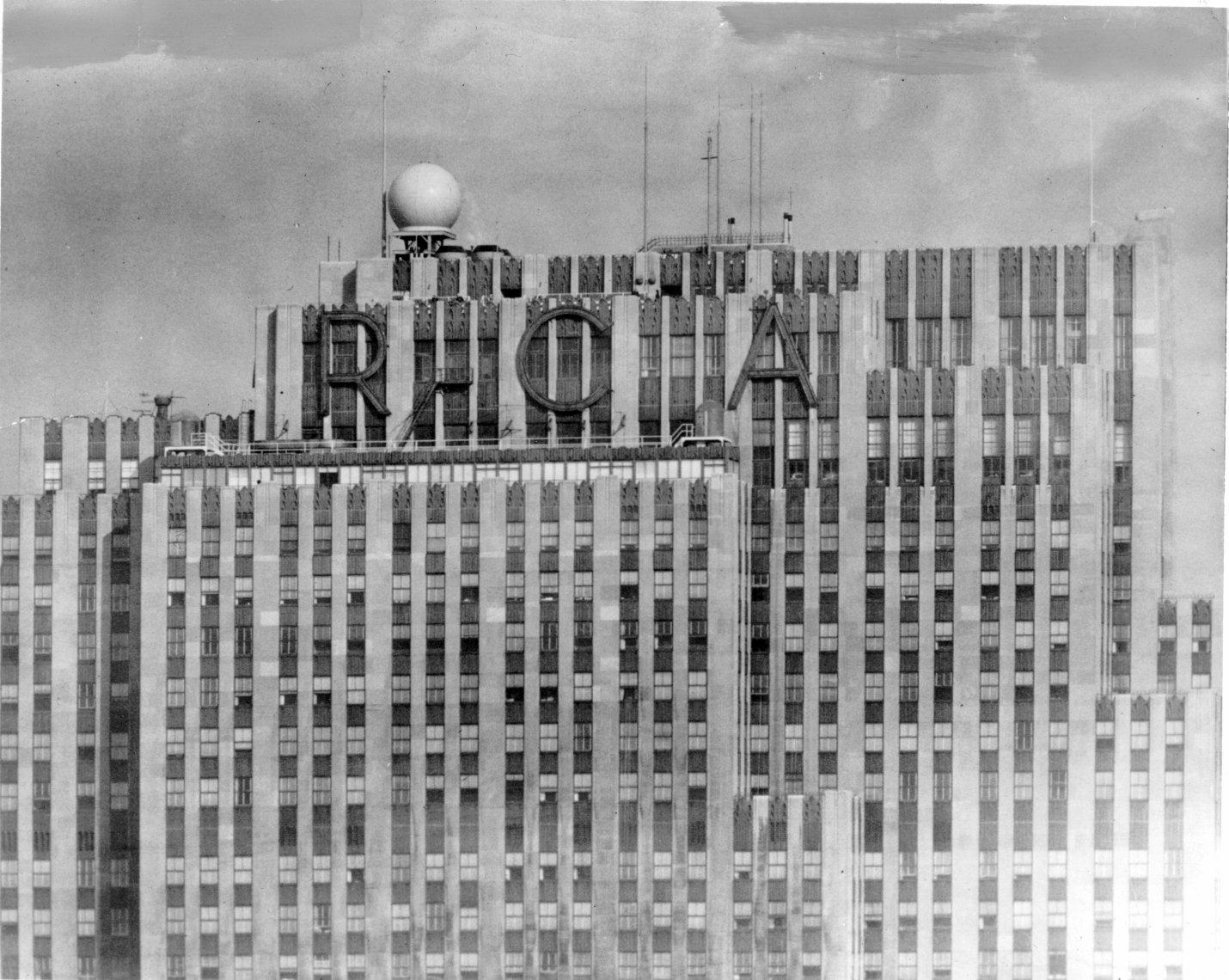
Site (Site ID)	Commissioned (Date / Chronological Rank)	Decommissioned
Miami, FL (MIA) Moved to Coral Gables in 1966.	June 26, 1959; Replaced WSR-1 1st	August 24, 1992 Destroyed by the winds of Hurricane Andrew.
Kansas City, MO (MCI) The dome used to reside downtown on the old Federal Building at 911 Walnut Street per SPC history	1959 2nd Replaced a WSR-1	November 9, 1995
Charleston, SC (CHS) Serial model 16	August 12, 1960 About 16th	December 2, 1996
Key West, FL (EYW) Serial model 19	June 10, 1960 Among first 31	March 21, 1983 Replaced by a WSR-74S.
Wichita, KS (ICT)	June 22, 1960 Among first 31; Replaced a WSR-3	November 9, 1995
Cincinnati, OH (CVG) (Covington, KY) at the Greater Cincinnati Airport.	June 28, 1960 (testing in June) About 16th	June 21, 1996
St. Louis, MO (STL)	July 18, 1960 Among first 31; Replaced a WSR-1	June 19, 1996
Wilmington, NC (ILM)	Before September 1960 Among first 31	November 16, 1995
Tampa Bay Area, FL (TPA while at Tampa, TBW when moved to Ruskin, FL) Serial model 20; Moved to Ruskin, FL May 1, 1975 to June 1, 1975	November 18, 1960 2nd commissioning June 1, 1975; Among first 31; Replaced a WSR-1	May 1, 1975 for move to Ruskin, FL Final decommissioning November 9, 1995
Galveston, TX (GLS) On top of the Post Office Building	June 11, 1961 Among first 31; Replaced a WSR-1	May 22, 1995
Brownsville, TX (BRO)	March 1, 1961 About 16th Replaced a WSR-1	February 28, 1996
Fort Worth, TX (FTW) moved to Stephenville, TX (SEP) September 10 to October 28, 1973.	April 5, 1961 Among first 31; Replaced a WSR-1	August 1, 1995
Detroit, MI	September 12, 1961 Among first 31; Replaced a WSR-3	Replaced with a WSR-74S.
Amarillo, TX (AMA)	March 6, 1961 Among first 31; Replaced a WSR-1	September 15, 1994
Norman, OK - NSSL Research radar; not part of the national operational network. Originally located at NSSL facility on the University of Oklahoma - Norman's North Research Campus near 35.23807,-97.46264 and later relocated to Woodward, OK in the 1989 as an off-network radar operated to support local emergency management and ARES services in an area of poor network radar coverage. Radar tower and antenna remains in place at 36.44133,-99.37137	1962? Probably not counted among first 31	1980s
Catalina Island, CA (STC?) a.k.a. Santa Catalina - atop Blackjack Mountain.	June 1, 1963 Among first 31	March 24, 1968 Station closed
Little Rock, AR (LIT was the WSR-57 designator. LZK is the WSR-88D and WFO Designation.)	April 19, 1961 Among first 31	Moved to North Little Rock Airport with NWSFO in 1975. Final decommissioning was June 8, 1995
Sacramento, CA (SAC)	February 2, 1960 Among first 31	August 24, 1995
Washington, D.C. (IAD) At Washington Dulles International Airport, Dulles, VA.	Early 1960s Among first 31	Early 1980s Replaced by a WSR-74S at Patuxent River, MD.
Apalachicola, FL (AQQ)	December 28, 1959 Among first 31	January 19, 1996
Daytona Beach, FL (DAB)	May 14, 1960 Among first 31	December 1, 1995
Des Moines, IA (DSM)	May 27, 1960 Among first 31; Replaced a WSR-1	May 7, 1996
Chicago, IL (CHI) Moved to Marseilles, IL (MMO) June 1, 1972 to April 5, 1973; A WR100-5 was leased during the move to Marseilles, IL	January 2, 1963 Second commissioning April 5, 1973; Among first 31; Replaced a WSR-3	1st decommissioning May 31, 1972 Final decommissioning February 28, 1983; Replaced by a WSR-74S
Evansville, IN (EVV) Serial model 8 Was located at 38.03565,-87.53854	April 28, 1960 Among first 31	July 12, 1996
Lake Charles, LA (LCH) Serial model 2	July 10, 1961 Among first 31; Replaced a WSR-1	October 12, 1995
New Orleans, LA (MSY) (SIL at Slidell, LA) Originally on roof of Federal Building in New Orleans before moving to 1120 Old Spanish Trail in Slidell, LA	November 2, 1960 Among first 31; Replaced a WSR-1	August 22, 1995
Minneapolis, MN (MSP) At the airport	September 12, 1961 Among first 31	April 3, 1996
Missoula, MT (MSO) At Point Six Mountain	November 1, 1961 Among first 31	December 12, 1995
Atlantic City, NJ (ACY)	August 25, 1961 Among first 31	September 13, 1995
New York City, NY (NYC) At 30 Rockefeller Plaza. WSR-57 dome atop 30 Rockefeller	March 6, 1961 Among first 31	September 26, 1995
Oklahoma City, OK (OKC) Was located at 35.40159,-97.60149	April 1, 1960 Among first 31; Replaced a WSR-1	July 25, 1994
Brunswick Naval Air Station, ME (NHZ)	January 1, 1962 (under Navy operations) Transferred to NOAA; December 5, 1969	February 1, 1985 Replaced by a WSR-74S in Portland, ME (PWM).
Jackson, MS (JAN) At Jackson International Airport at Thompson Field.	March 7, 1969 Replaced a WSR-3	June 21, 1995
Limon, CO (LIC)	July 1, 1970	December 22, 1995
Garden City, KS (GCK)	March 31, 1970	September 1, 1994
Grand Island, NE (GRI)	June 15, 1971	January 19, 1996 Has been torn down to make way for a new airport terminal
Buffalo, NY (BUF)	October 29, 1961	February 14, 1996
A note on the chronological ranks - The first 31 were built through the early 1960s, at existing Weather Bureau offices. 14 were along the Gulf and Atlantic coasts. 11 were in the Midwest. 3 were inland of the East Coast, and California and Montana had one each on mountaintops. The late 1960s saw 14 more built east of the Rockies.
Nashville, TN (BNA) (OHX is the WSR-88D); At Old Hickory Lake	November 30, 1970 Replaced a WSR-3	January 19, 1996
Memphis, TN (MEG is the WSR-88D); At the Millington Naval Air Station (NQA). Moved to Memphis (MEM)	July 1, 1961 (under Navy operations) Operations transferred to NOAA; February 1, 1971	January 6, 1986 Replaced by a WSR-74S.
Medford, OR (MFR)	June 30, 1971	August 30, 1996
Centreville, AL (CKL) 8 miles southwest of Brent, AL	December 10, 1970 2nd commissioning August 10, 1973	May 27, 1973 heavily damaged by an F4 tornado Final decommissioning June 27, 1995
Pensacola, FL (NPA)		January 19, 1996
Athens, GA (AHN)	June 21, 1966	September 13, 1996
Waycross, GA (AYS)	August 6, 1969	January 19, 1996
Cape Hatteras, NC (HAT) At what is now 47730 Buxton Back Road	January 30, 1968 Replaced a SP-1M	December 6, 1995
Pittsburgh, PA (PIT) (PBZ is the WSR-88D)	August 1, 1966	May 10, 1995
Huron, SD (HON)	October 30, 1971	November 4, 1996, now a live dual-polarization for KELO-TV
Bristol, TN (TRI) Located at 6247 Panhandle Road atop Holston Mountain near Elizabethton	May 25, 1972	January 19, 1996
Midland/Odessa, TX (MAF)	June 15, 1972 Replaced a WSR-1	June 4, 1996
Neenah, WI (EEW) At 3009 Fairview Road	June 28, 1971	November 2, 1995
Hondo, TX (HDO)	August 2, 1971 66th and final WSR-57	March 14, 1996
Monett, MO (UMN) Located at 3258 Farm Road 1090 south of Monett	March 18, 1971	February 1, 1996
Chatham, MA (CHH) Transfer of operations from the SP-1M at Nantucket, MA	August 9, 1971	Replaced by a WSR-74S

== See also ==
- List of radars
- List of military electronics of the United States
