= AN/ALQ-172 =

US military aircraft defensive ECM system

- Electronic countermeasures
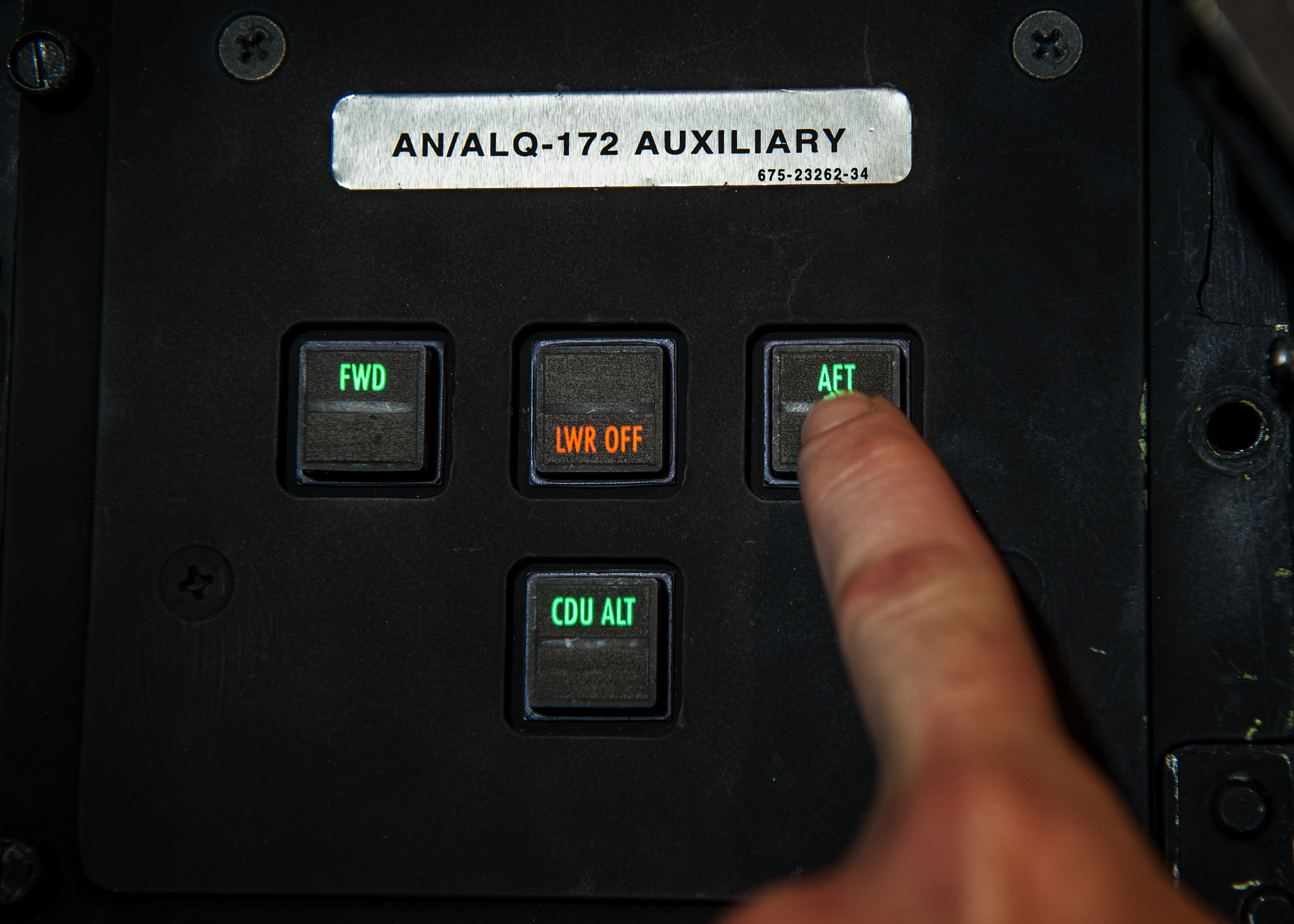
- Electronic warfare officer operating the ALQ-172 auxiliary control
- Status: In service

Manufacturing Info
- Manufacturer: ITT Avionics; L3Harris
- Designer: ITT Avionics
- Introduced: 1984; 41 years ago
- Production Period: 1984–present
- No. Produced: >940 systems >6,000 LRUs
- Developed From: AN/ALQ-117(V)

Specifications
- Frequency Range: 0.1–18 GHz (299.8–1.7 cm)
- Weight: 1,631 lb (740 kg)
- Input Voltage: 115/200 VAC, 400 Hz; 28 VDC

Usage
- Used by Country: United States
- Used by Military: US Air Force
- Used by Aircraft: AC-130H Spectre; AC-130U Spooky; B-52H Stratofortress; MC-130E Combat Talon; MC-130H Combat Talon II
- Variants: AN/ALQ-172(V); AN/ALQ-172(V)1; AN/ALQ-172(V)2; AN/ALQ-172(V)3

AN/ALQ-172 is an integrated airborne defensive electronic countermeasure internally-mounted system for the B-52 Stratofortress, MC-130E Combat Talon, MC-130H Combat Talon II, AC-130H Spectre and AC-130U Spooky. Originally produced by ITT Avionics in the early 1980s, and later L3Harris Technologies, it was designed to improve low-level penetration survivability of the B-52.

== History ==
First delivered by ITT in 1984, a 1996 study by analysts from Battelle Memorial Institute determined problems with repair of the ALQ-172 resulted in the highest cost per flying hour (CPFH) of any system on the B-52. The United States Air Force instituted Engineering Change Proposal (ECP) 93 modifying the system's memory and processing capability. The ECP 93 modifications upgraded ALQ-172(V)1 line-replaceable units (LRUs) 1, 3, 4, and 10 and replaced LRU 2 resulting in the enhanced ALQ-172(V)3.

Also in FY96, Air Staff directed the enhanced ALQ-172(V)3 be installed on AC-130H gunships replacing the earlier (V)1 version of the ALQ-172, and non-supportable AN/ALQ-131 jamming pods. Also on special operations forces (SOF) AC-130U, MC-130H and MC-130E aircraft, an additional ALQ-172 subsystem was installed, bringing the number to 2 sub-systems; one forward and one aft, with a single common display and control unit. Other engineering differences on these aircraft involved adding low-band countermeasures transmitters, antennae and antenna control units.

By fiscal year 1997 (FY97), the same group reported a second system was needed on the aircraft for full threat protection.

Further upgrades have incorporated geolocation capabilities, advanced countermeasures and new technologies. The upgrades are part of the 2021 maintainability and reliability system (MARS) upgrade; a 10-year, $947 million project enhancing the performance of the B-52's electronic countermeasures systems. Nine line-replaceable units (LRUs) have been upgraded, with five of those tested by mid-2024. As part of the MARS contract, LRUs 1, 3, 4, and 10 have been upgraded with LRU-2 being replaced with a new high-voltage power supply. With continuing support and upgrades, the ALQ-172 is expected to be in service well into the 2040s.

== Technical description ==
=== Features ===
Integrated with aircraft controls and displays, the system provides countermeasures capabilities for multiple sophisticated pulse, continuous wave, doppler and monopulse threats simultaneously. Using digital frequency discrimination (DFD) technology, the system is capable of determining pulse width, angle of arrival (AOA), and pulse-repetition frequency (PRF) of threat signals, deinterleaving and processing them. Countermeasure techniques available to the ALQ-172(V)3 include spot noise, barrage noise, swept noise, range/angle deception, cross-eye, and false target generation.

In accordance with the Joint Electronics Type Designation System (JETDS), the AN/ALQ-172 designation represents the 172nd design of an Army-Navy electronic device for an electronic countermeasures system. The JETDS system also now is used to name all Department of Defense and some NATO electronic systems.

=== Characteristics ===
AN/ALQ-172(V)2

- Weight per aircraft: 1,631 pounds (740 kg)
- Operating frequency range:
  - Low-band: 0.1–2 GHz (300–15 cm)
  - Mid-band: 2–6 GHz (15.0–5.0 cm)
  - High-band: 6–18 GHz (5.0–1.7 cm)
- LRUs per system: 7
- Systems per aircraft: 2
- Antennas per aircraft: 7
- Systems produced: 943 (over 6,000 LRUs)

=== Components ===
Based on the MARS upgrades, the below list contains information regarding components of the AN/ALQ-171(V)3 version of the jammer.

- LRU-1: Countermeasures Receiver / Receiver-Processor – Detects and digitizes threat radar emissions; pulse characterization (pulse width, PRF), AOA estimation, de-interleaving and threat signal processing. Part number: R-2247/ALQ-172
- LRU-2: High-Voltage Power Supply (HVPS) / Power & Cooling Distribution – Supplies high-voltage power required by transmitter/modulator stages; provides power conditioning and supports cooling/air distribution interfaces. Noted in field support/repair solicitations. Part number: A301402-1
- LRU-3: Modulator / Antenna Control / Timing Processor – Handles waveform modulation/timing for transmitters and/or controls antenna switching and low-level RF routing; subject of wiring/TCTO changes in field engineering records. Part number: A301405-1
- LRU-4: Countermeasures Transmitter / Power Amplifier – High-power ECM transmit functions: amplification of PR, PD and CW ECM waveforms, deception waveform generation and often part of antenna T/R group. Part number: A301408-1
- LRU-5: Chassis / Equipment Mounting / Interface – Structural/electrical equipment assembly containing non-RF electronics, mounting, aircraft interface and I/O connections; naming varies across variants. Part number: A301410-1
- LRU-6: Antenna Amplifier / Receiver Converter – Quadrant amplifier / blade amp assemblies for receive/transmit conversion; mid/high-band amplifier converters used in the antenna group. Part number: A301414-1
- LRU-7: Auxiliary Receiver / Processor / Packaging Module – Auxiliary receiver/processor or module appearing paired with other LRUs in packaging/field support documentation; role varies by installation. Part number: A301416-1
- LRU-8: Control / Display / Human-Machine Interface (HMI) Unit – Crew interface and control electronics (display, control panel, I/O); sometimes split into separate LRUs depending on installation. Part number: A301420-1
- LRU-9: Support / Conditioning / RF Filter / RF Switch Assembly – RF switching, filtering, bias supplies and small support modules that route signals between receivers, processors, and transmitters; listed in upgrade/field-support summaries. Part number: A301425-1
- LRU-10: Processing / Upgrade Module (subject of MARS upgrades) – Identified in SRD/upgrade documents as a significant module targeted for upgrade alongside LRUs 1,3,4; likely contains processing, digital logic or waveform generation elements. Part number: A301430-1

== Variants ==
- AN/ALQ-172(V)
- AN/ALQ-172(V)1 – on MC-130H Spectre and AC-130U Spooky aircraft
- AN/ALQ-172(V)2 – on B-52H Stratofortress
- AN/ALQ-172(V)3 – on AC-130H Spectre, potentially extending frequency coverage to 40 GHz (7.5 mm)

== See also ==
- AN/ALQ-99 – US military electronic warfare pod
- AN/ALQ-101 – Military aircraft electronic countermeasures pod
- AN/ALQ-135 – F-15 Eagle fighter aircraft electronic countermeasures pod
- AN/ALQ-218 – US Navy/Marines military aircraft radar warning receiver
- List of military electronics of the United States
