= NGJ =

NGJ may refer to:

- New Games Journalism, a model of New Journalism applied to video game journalism in which personal anecdotes, references to other media, and creative analyses are used to explore game design, play, and culture
- Next Generation Jammer, a program to develop an airborne electronic warfare system, as a replacement for the AN/ALQ-99 found on the EA-18G military aircraft
- No Greater Joy, a U.S. 501(c)(3) non-profit ministry of Michael and Debi Pearl established to train parents in effective parenting based on the Bible
- Nordic Game Jam, an annual game jam that takes place in Copenhagen
