= Tews =

Tews is a surname. Notable people with the surname include:

- Andreas Tews (born 1968), German amateur boxer
- George L. Tews (1883–1936), American machinist, businessman, real estate broker and politician

== See also ==
- Tew's Falls, waterfall in Hamilton, Ontario, Canada
- AN/ALQ-135, produced for the Tactical Electronic Warfare Suite (TEWS)
