= Ram air turbine =

Small power source installed on aircraft

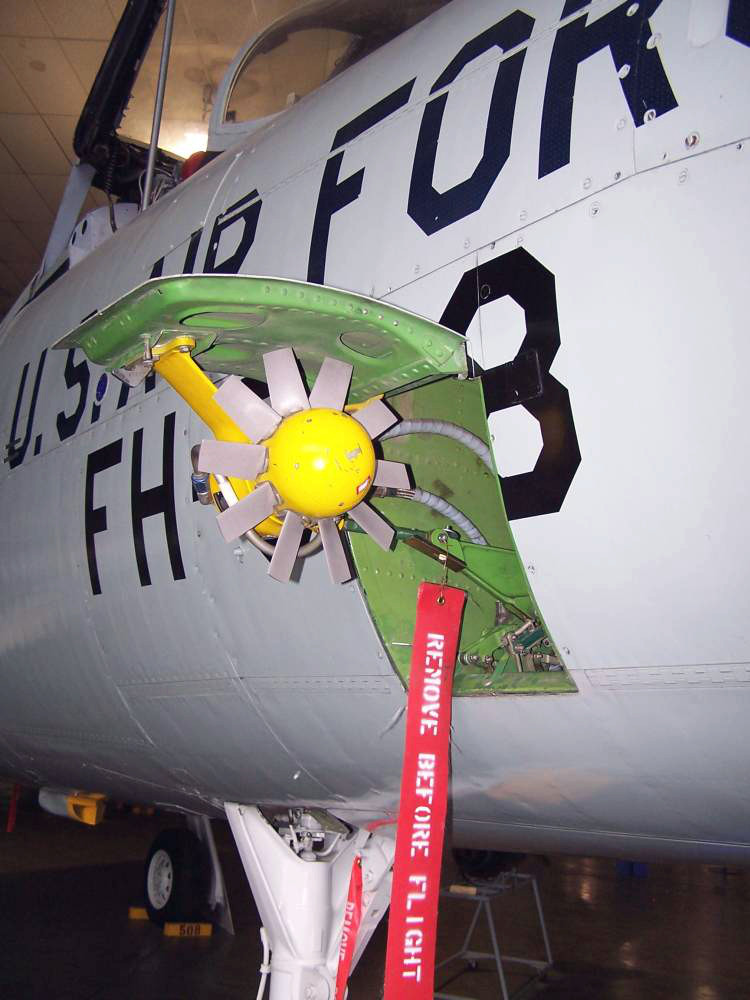
Ram air turbine on a Republic F-105 Thunderchief fighter-bomber

A ram air turbine (RAT) is a small wind turbine that is connected to a hydraulic pump, or electrical generator, installed in an aircraft and used as a power source. The RAT generates power from the airstream by ram pressure due to the speed of the aircraft. It may be called an air-driven generator (ADG) on some aircraft.

== Operation ==
Modern aircraft generally use RATs only in an emergency. In case of the loss of both primary and auxiliary power sources, the RAT will power vital systems (flight controls, linked hydraulics and also flight-critical instrumentation). Some RATs produce only hydraulic power, which is in turn used to power electrical generators.

In some early aircraft (including airships), small RATs were permanently mounted and operated a small electrical generator or fuel pump. Some constant-speed propellers, such as those of the Argus As 410 engines used in the Focke-Wulf Fw 189, used a propeller turbine on the spinner to power a self-contained pitch governor controlling this constant speed.

Modern aircraft generate power in the main engines or an additional fuel-burning turbine engine called an auxiliary power unit, which is often mounted in the rear of the fuselage or in the main-wheel well. The RAT generates power from the airstream due to the speed of the aircraft. If aircraft speeds are low, the RAT will produce less power. In normal conditions the RAT is retracted into the fuselage (or wing), and is deployed manually or automatically following complete loss of power. In the time between power loss and RAT deployment, batteries are used.

== Military use ==
RATs are common in military aircraft, which must be capable of surviving sudden and complete loss of power.

They also power pod-fitted systems such as the M61A1 Vulcan cannon. Some free-fall nuclear weapons, such as the British Yellow Sun and Red Beard, used RATs to power radar altimeters and firing circuits; these were a more reliable alternative to batteries.

Military aircraft with ram air turbines
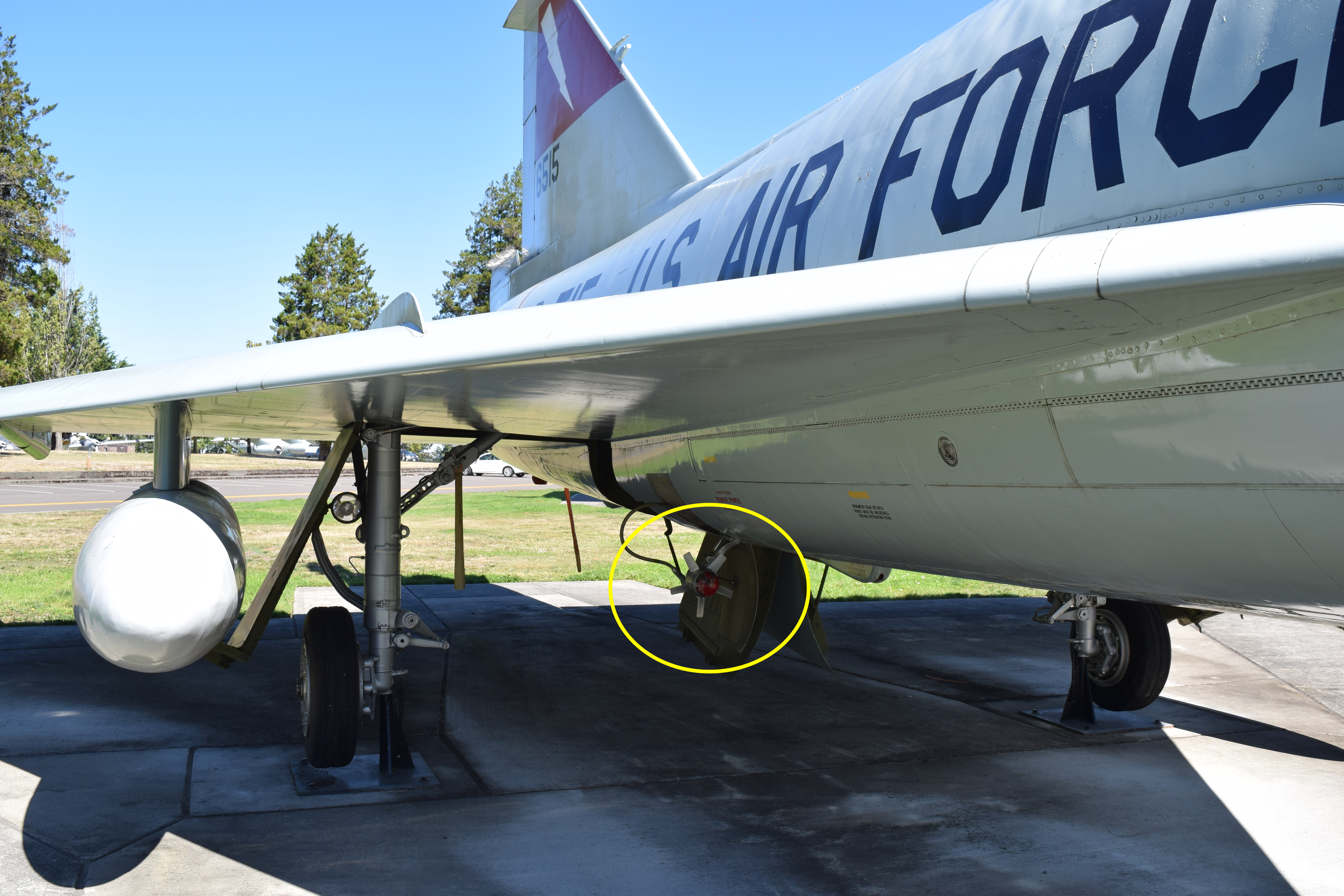
Convair F-102 Delta Dagger. The yellow circle highlights a ram air turbine with five blades.

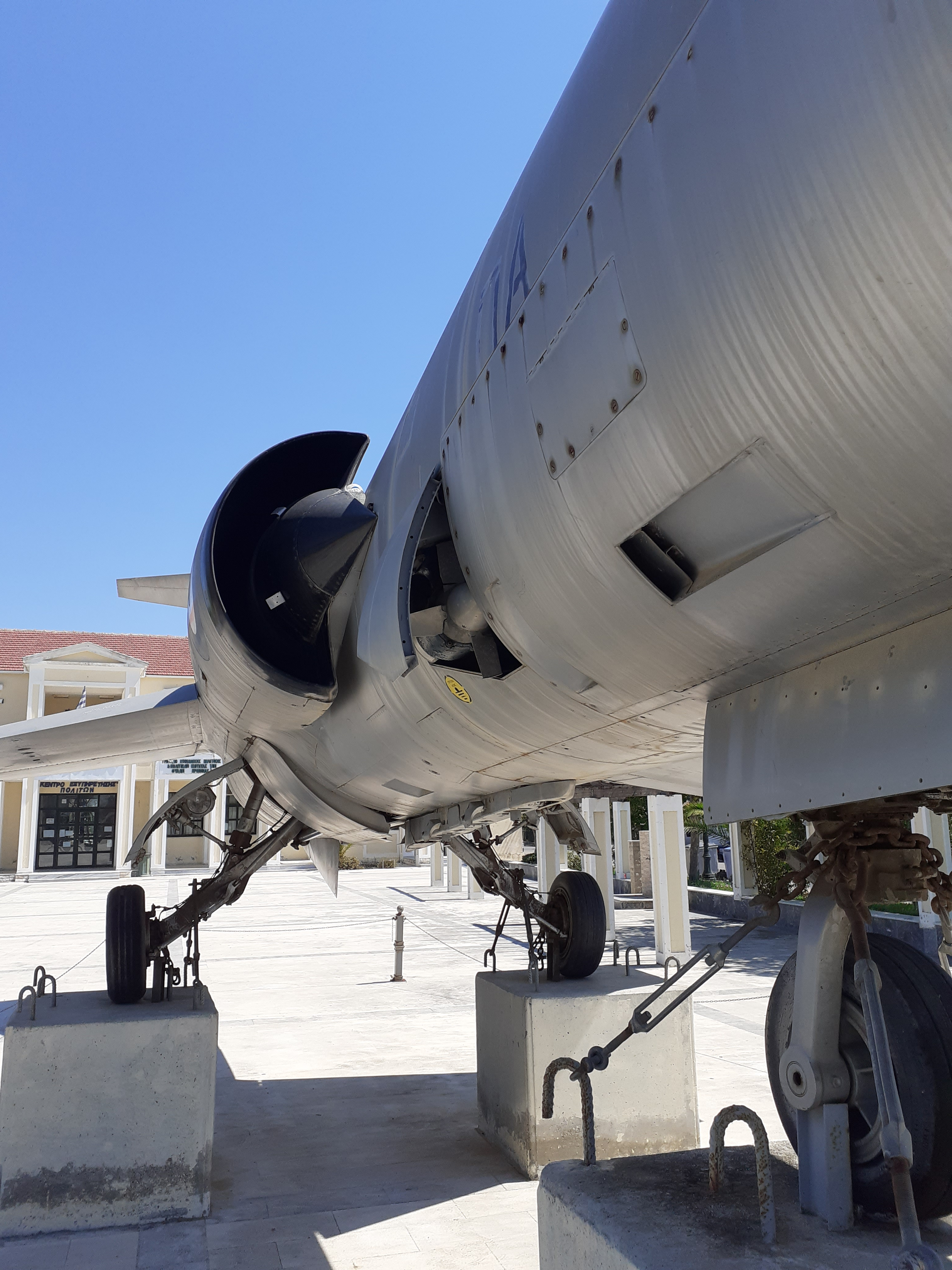
Ram air turbine in a Lockheed F-104 Starfighter fighter-bomber

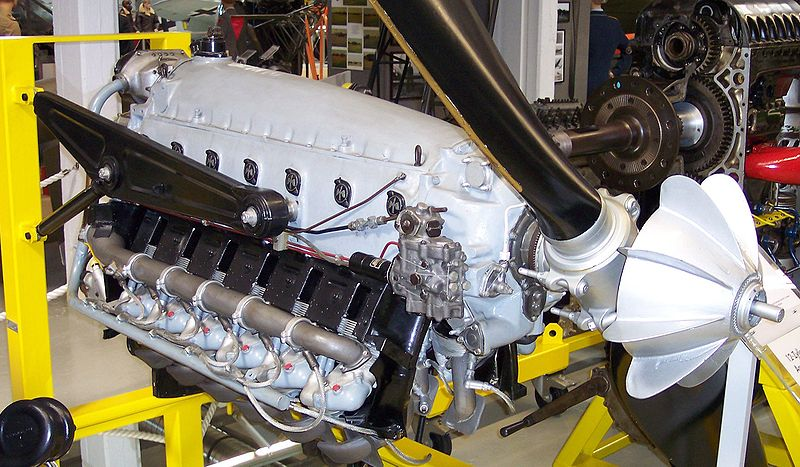
Argus As 410 engine and ram air turbine used to power the actuator of the variable-pitch propeller, which is visible in front of the engine and behind the ram air turbine

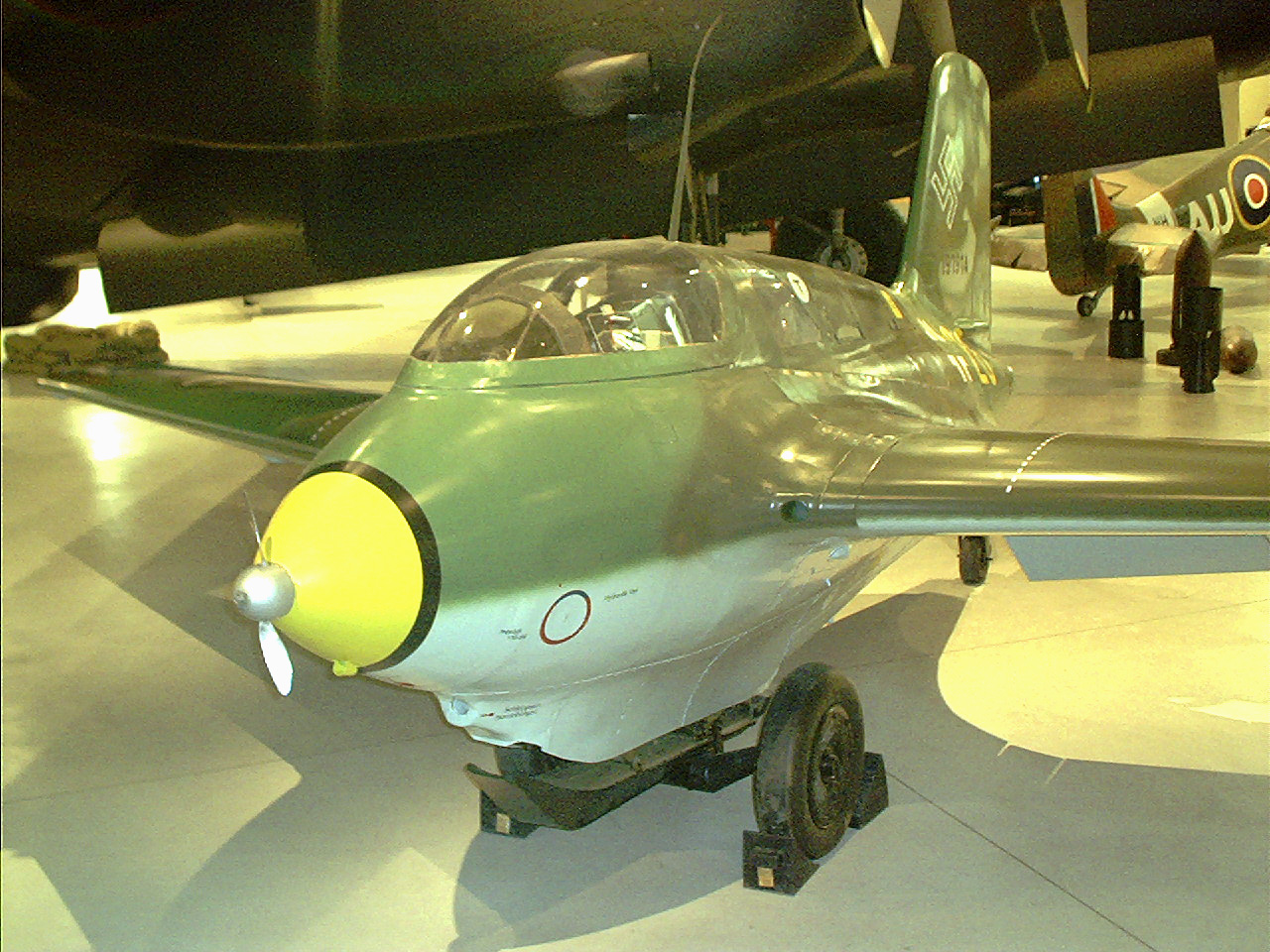
A rocket propelled Messerschmitt Me 163B Komet with its nose-mount ram-air turbine as its only source of electrical power

=== Wing mount ===
High-powered electronics such as the AN/ALQ-99 jamming system can be self powered by a RAT in standard operation. This allows their installation on a standard hardpoint, without requiring a pod-specific power supply. As many as five AN/ALQ-99 systems with built in ram air turbines can be mounted on a Boeing EA-18G Growler, with two under each wing and one under the fuselage of the aircraft. Each AN/ALQ-99 contains two transmitters, each with its own directional antenna. They are not retracted, staying deployed continuously during flight.

Growler aircraft with ram air turbines mounted under the wings and body
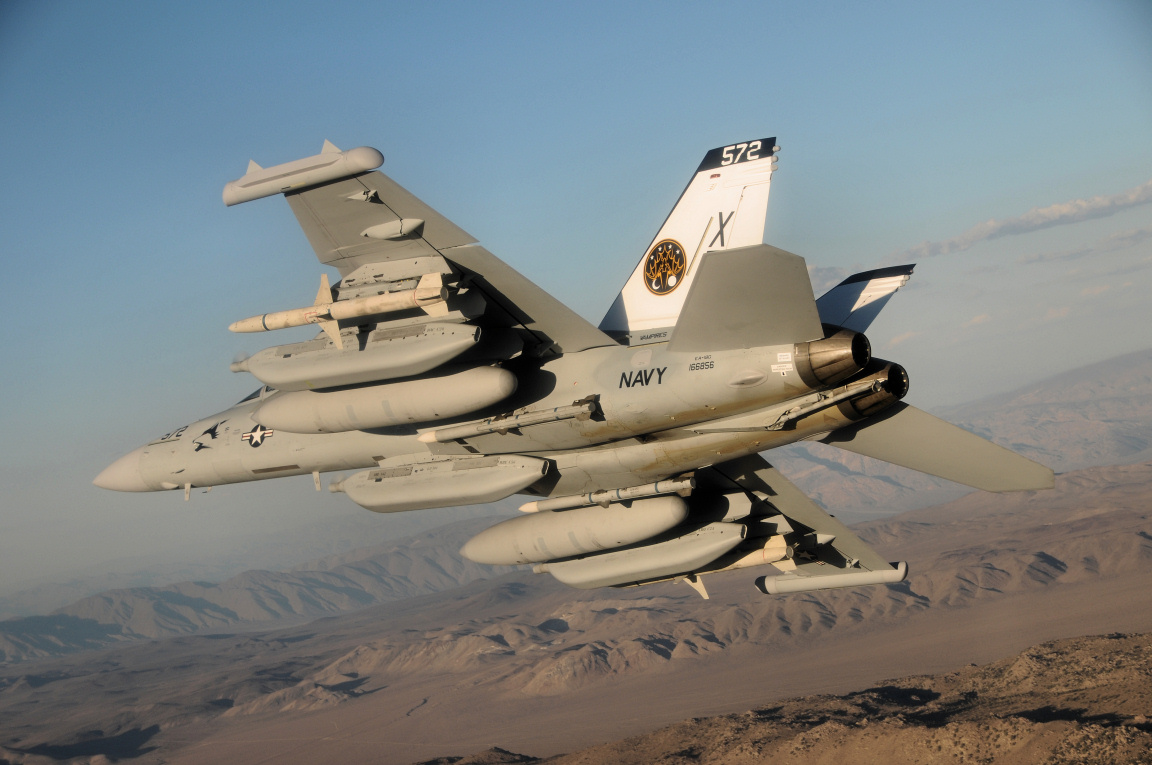
An EA-18G Growler, carrying under each wing an external fuel tank, a AN/ALQ-99 system with a ram air turbine, a jamming pod, and an AGM-88C HARM anti-radiation missile, with an additional AN/ALQ-99 system centered under the fuselage of the aircraft

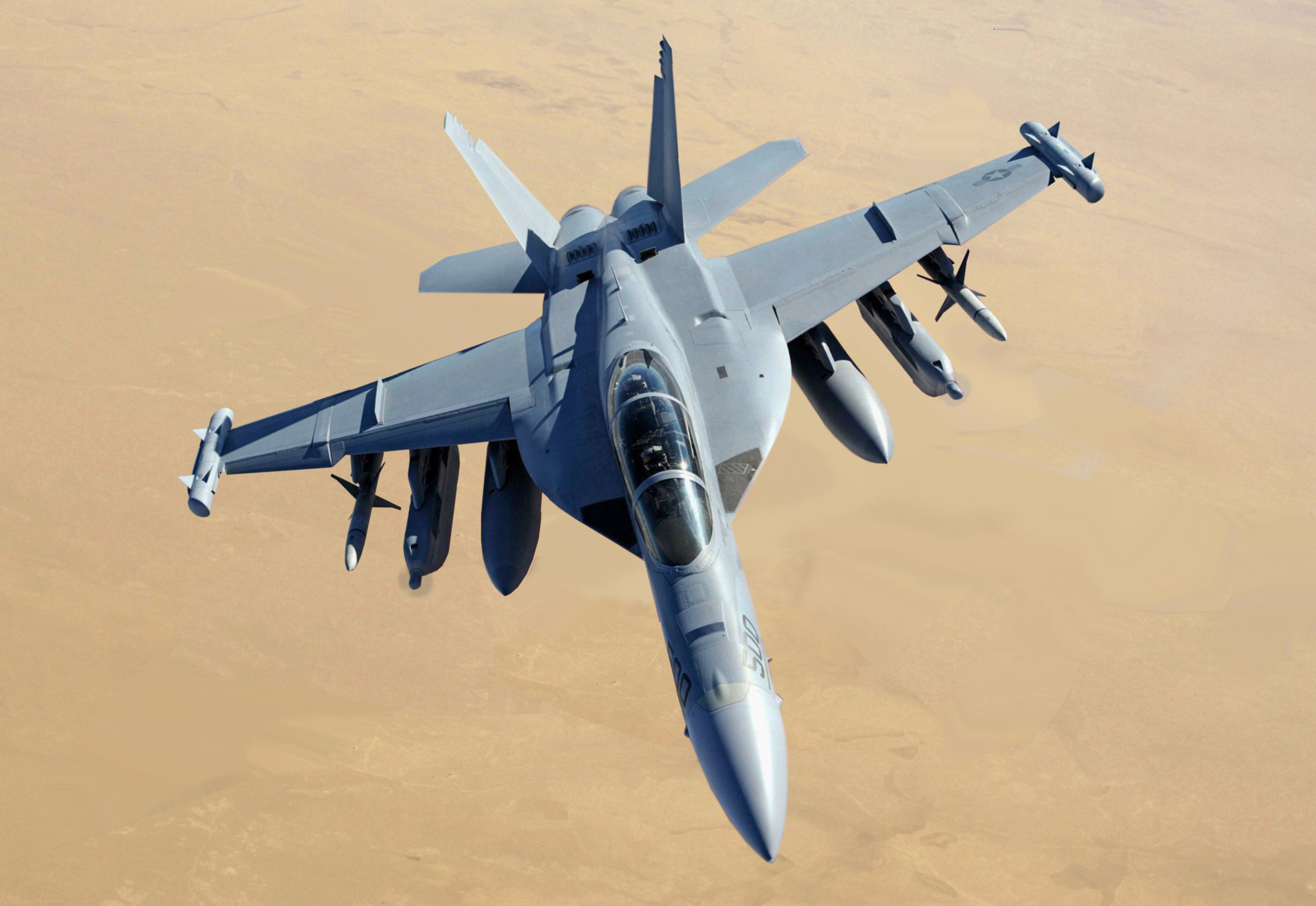
A US Navy EA-18G Growler from Electronic Attack Squadron 129 (VAQ-129) carrying similar equipment. The spinning blades on the ram air turbines appear blurred.
Interview with U.S. Secretary of Defense
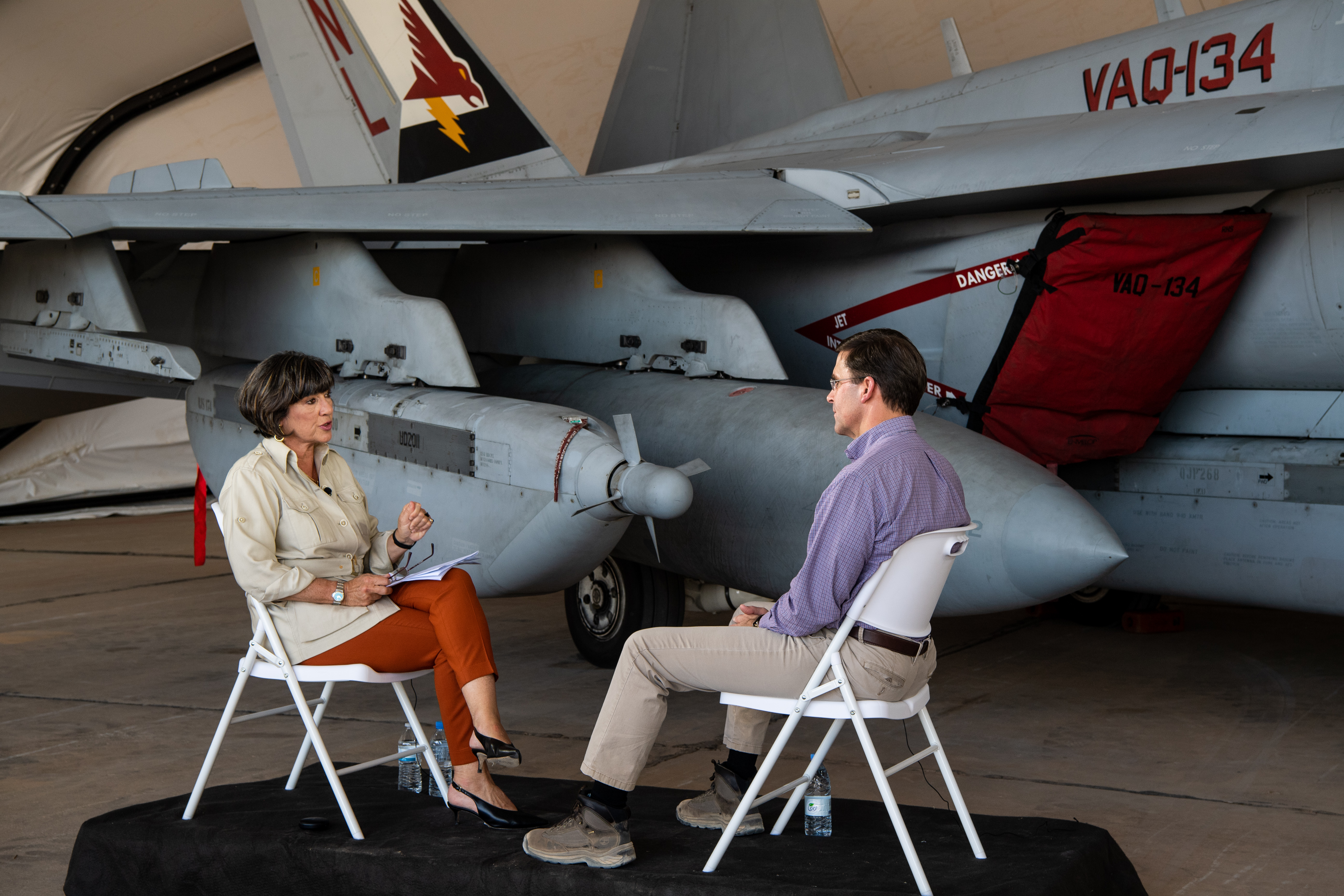
A wing-mount AN/ALQ-99 jamming system powered by a ram air turbine was chosen as a backdrop for an interview with Defense Secretary Mark Esper by Christiane Amanpour.

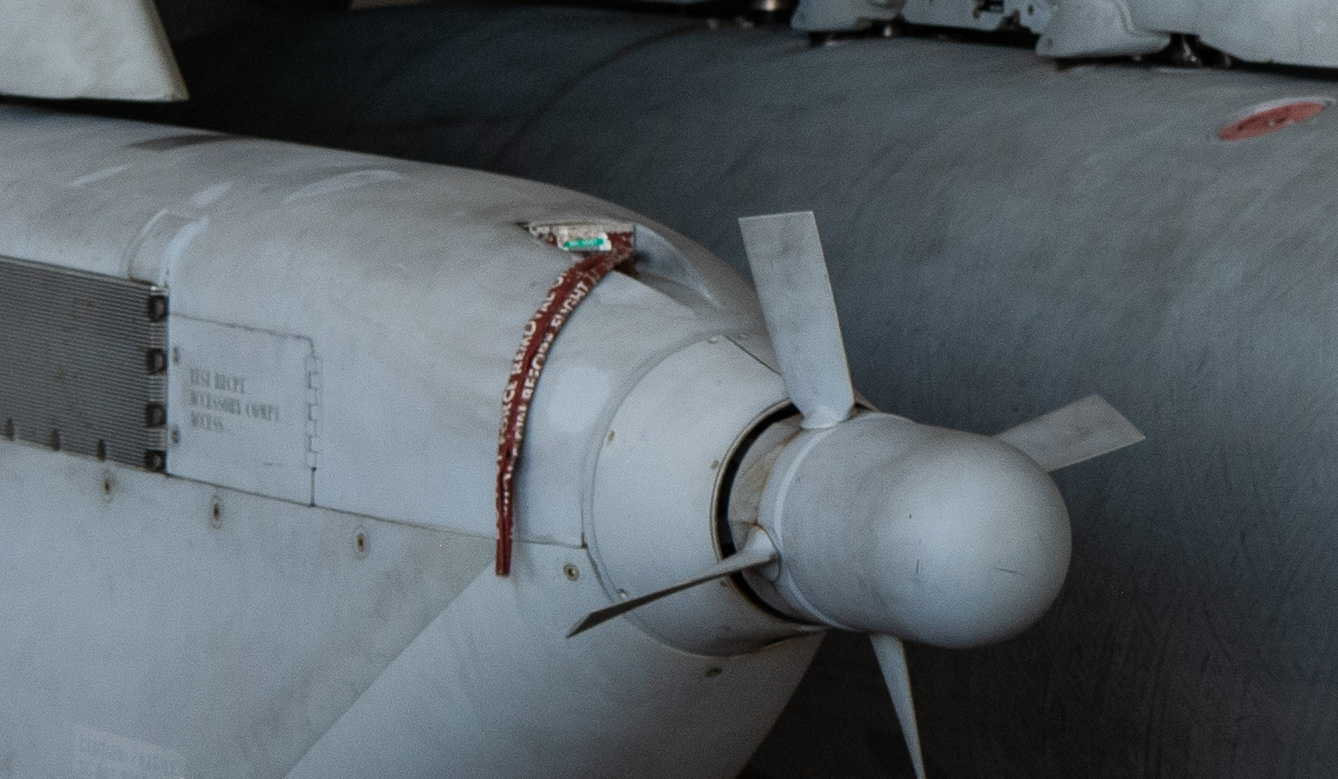
The ram air turbine. The turbine has four blades which spin continuously to power the jamming system when the aircraft is in flight.

== Civilian use ==
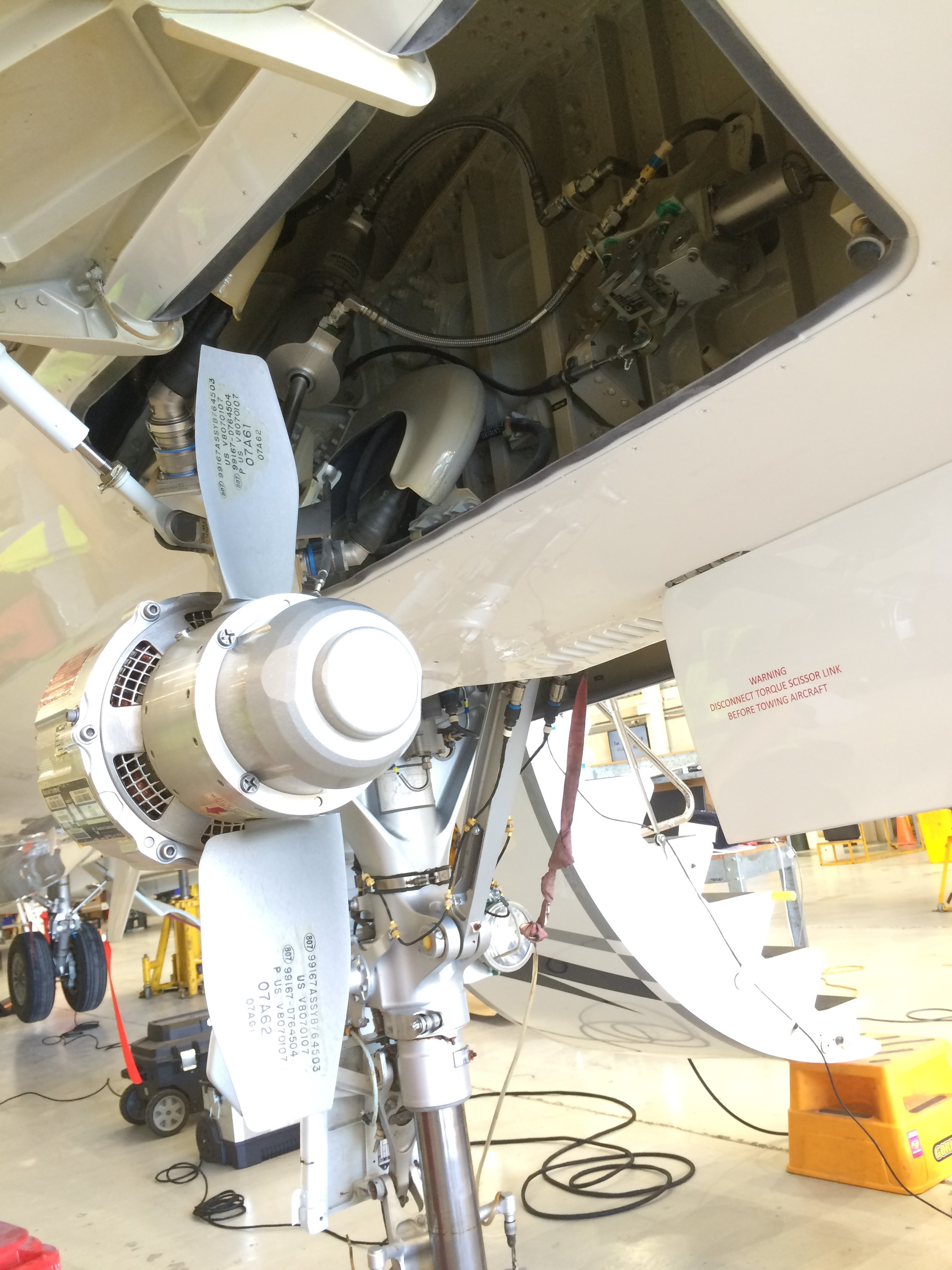
Ram air turbine on a Dassault Falcon 7X business jet

Many modern types of commercial airliners, from the Vickers VC10 of the 1960s onwards, are equipped with RATs. A ram air turbine driving an electrical generator was chosen for the VC10 because of its use of "packaged" hydraulically powered flying controls, rather than a centralised hydraulic system. The individual package units of the VC10 were each powered electrically and so emergency redundancy for the VC10 relied on quadruple generators and a backup RAT generator at a time when most RATs drove hydraulic pumps.

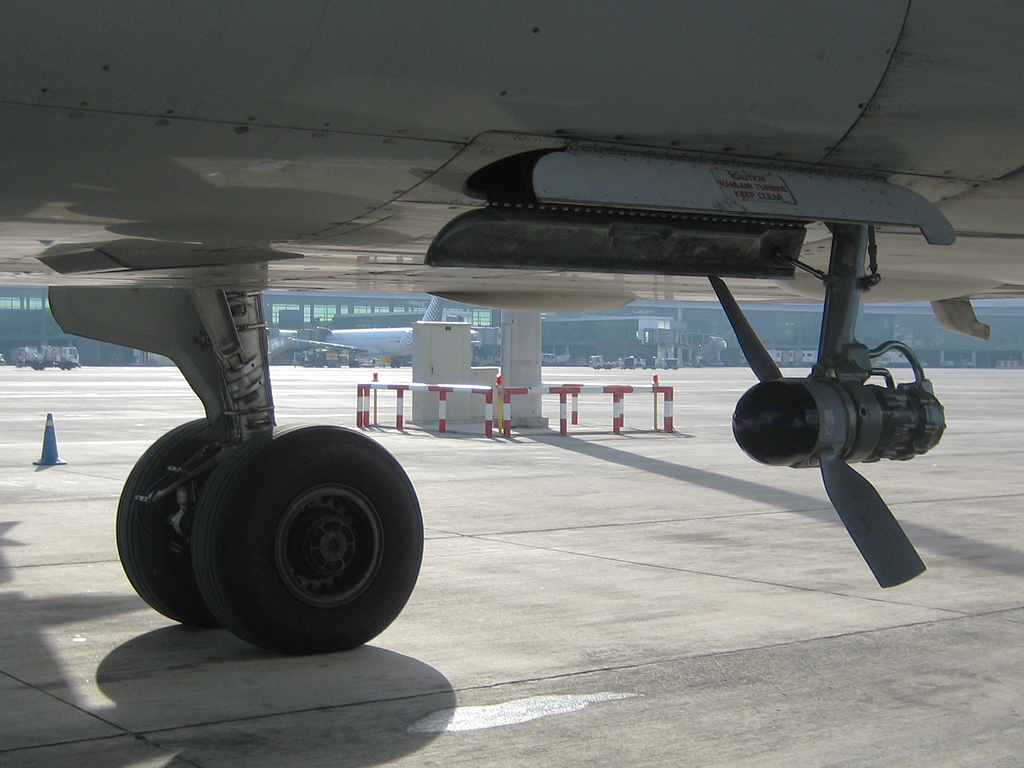
Ram air turbine on Airbus A320

The Airbus A380 has the largest RAT in the world at 1.63 metres (64 in) in diameter, but around 80 centimetres (31 in) is more common. A typical large RAT on a commercial aircraft can be capable of producing 5 to 70 kW, depending on the generator. Smaller, low airspeed models may generate as little as 400 watts.

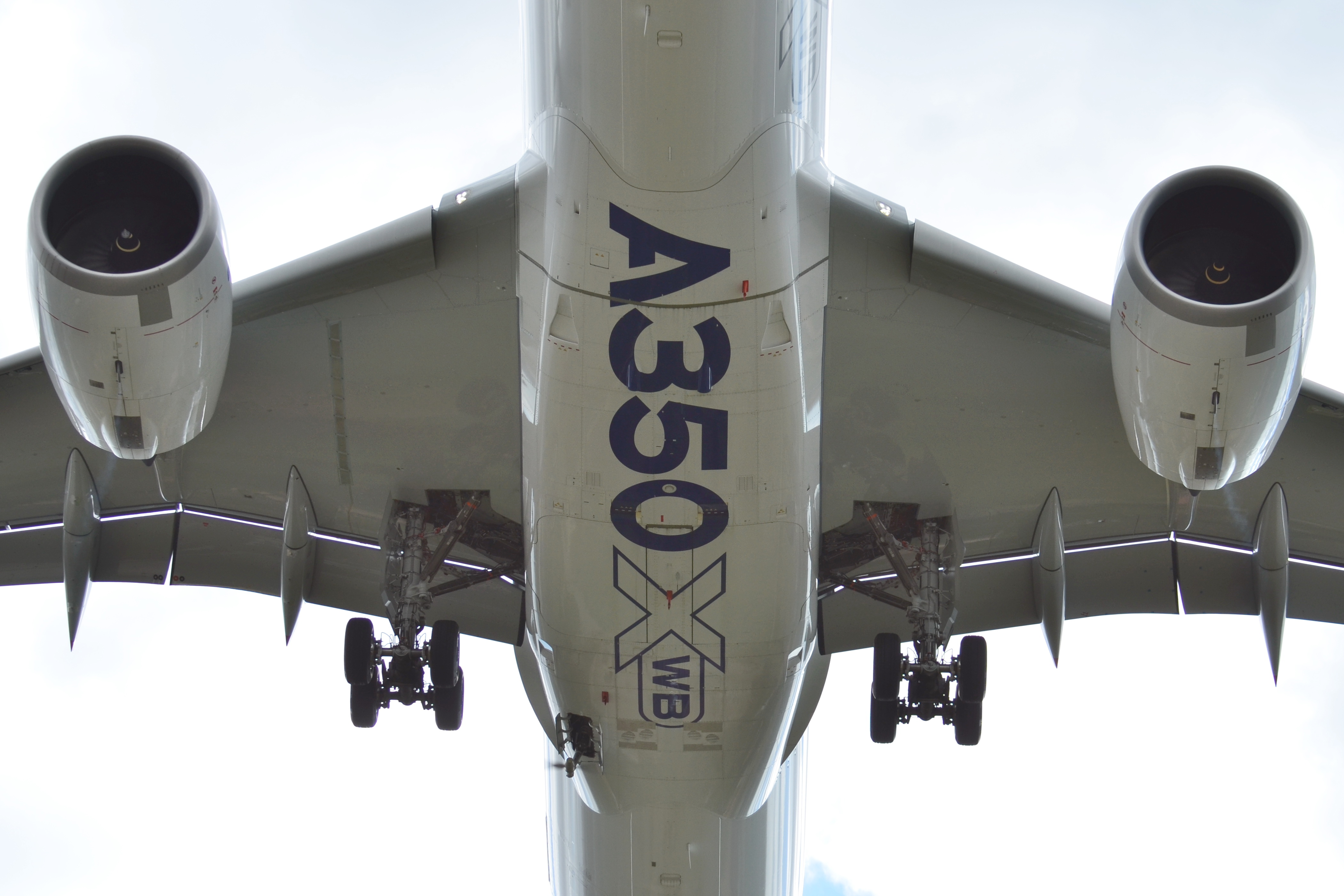
RAT on Airbus A350 (seen in the lower left of the fuselage)

RATs have also been used to power centrifugal pumps to pressurize the spray systems on aircraft that are used as crop dusters to deliver liquid agents to cropland. The major reason for choosing a RAT is safety; using a RAT in the United States allows an FAA-certified engine and power systems on the aircraft to remain unmodified. There is no need to use an engine power takeoff to drive the pump, as the pump can be placed low or below the exterior of the airframe, greatly simplifying plumbing. Being the lowest point in the plumbing, it will have gravity feed from the spray tanks and never need to be primed. In the event of a pump failure that could result in seizure, there is no effect on the flying ability of the aircraft or its systems apart from the fact that the spray systems are non-functional.

=== Civilian incidents involving RAT deployment ===
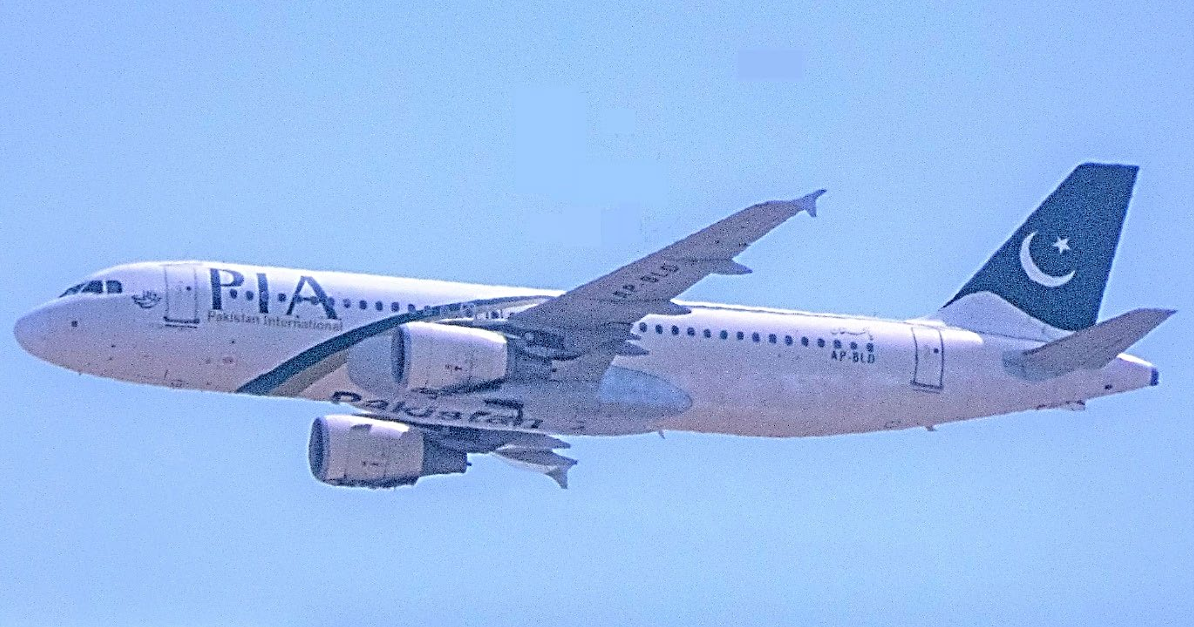
Pakistan International Airlines Flight 8303 with its ram air turbine deployed after both engines and generators failed following an attempted belly landing

The following aviation incidents involved the deployment of a ram air turbine:

- 1974: British Airways Flight 910
- 1983: Air Canada Flight 143, also known as the Gimli Glider incident
- 1996: The hijacking of Ethiopian Airlines Flight 961
- 2000: Hapag-Lloyd Flight 3378
- 2001: Air Transat Flight 236, also known as the Azores Glider incident
- 2004: Pinnacle Airlines Flight 3701
- 2009: US Airways Flight 1549
- 2016: Air Canada Flight 361
- 2018: SmartLynx Estonia Flight 9001
- 2020: Pakistan International Airlines Flight 8303
- 2022: LATAM Paraguay Flight 1325
- 2024: Virgin Atlantic Flight 105
- 2025: Air India Flight 171
- 2025: LATAM Flight 603
