= AN/ALQ-135 =

F-15 Eagle fighter aircraft electronic countermeasures pod

- Electronic countermeasure pod
- Status: In use

Manufacturing Info
- Manufacturer: Northrop Grumman
- Introduced: 1972; 53 years ago
- Production Period: 1972–2008, (36 years)

Specifications
- Frequency Range: 2–20 GHz (15.0–1.5 cm)
- Weight: 300 lb (140 kg)

Usage
- Used by Military: US Air Force; Republic of Korea Air Force
- Used by Aircraft: F-15E Strike Eagle; F-15K Slam Eagle
- Variants: AN/ALQ-135(V); AN/ALQ-135D; AN/ALQ-135M

The AN/ALQ-135 is an internally-mounted electronic countermeasure (ECM) jamming system produced by Northrop Grumman for the Tactical Electronic Warfare Suite (TEWS) on F-15 Eagle and F-15 variant aircraft. The system can jam and track multiple anti-aircraft missiles in addition to other threats. During the Gulf War, the AN/ALQ-135 logged more than 6,600 hours of combat, yet no aircraft were lost to a threat the system protects against.

The Tactical Electronic Warfare Suite (TEWS) was a fully integrated self-protection system to defeat threats to the F-15 aircraft. Integrated systems working in conjunction with the ALQ-135 were the AN/ALQ-56 radar warning receiver, AN/ALQ-128 Electronic Warfare Warning Set and AN/ALE-45 chaff and flare dispenser.

In accordance with the Joint Electronics Type Designation System (JETDS), the "AN/ALQ-135" designation represents the 135th design of an Army-Navy airborne electronic device for special countermeasures equipment. The JETDS system is also now used to name all Department of Defense and some NATO electronic systems.

== Development ==
Since the 1970s, the ALQ-135 system has been a component of F-15 aircraft. The system has been continually upgraded with modifications to the processor, durability upgrades, and weight reduction. The system was installed on more than 500 F-15s. The band 3 system was first installed in 1988 while the band 1.5 system was first installed aboard F-15s in 2000.

During the late 2010s, the ALQ-135 was to be replaced by the AN/ALQ-250 Eagle Passive/Active Warning and Sustainment System (EPAWSS).

== Description ==
The modern system consists of five components of band 1.5 (B1.5) and band 3 (B3) equipment to cover the full spectrum of threats between 2–20 GHz (15.0–1.5 cm) with B1.5 covering lower frequencies and B3 the higher frequencies. Specifically, B1.5 covers 2–10 GHz (15.0–3.0 cm) and B3 covers 10–20 GHz (3.0–1.5 cm).

The AN/ALQ-135(V) system consists of the B3 RF Amplifier, B3 Control/Oscillator, B1.5 RF Amplifier, B1.5 Control/Oscillator, and the LRU-14. The band 1.5 and band 3 equipment share 70% of their hardware. This means that logistics and maintenance are more easily performed. The band 1.5 and band 3 systems can jam both high band and low band threats.

Size Specifications
Component	Weight	Volume	Dimensions
B3 RF Amplifier	97 lb (44 kg)	2,030 cu in (0.0333 m^{3})	11.8 × 8 × 21.5 in (300 × 200 × 550 mm)
B3 Control/Oscillator	116 lb (53 kg)	2,408 cu in (0.03946 m^{3})	14 × 8 × 21.5 in (360 × 200 × 550 mm)
B1.5 RF Amplifier	95 lb (43 kg)	2,030 cu in (0.0333 m^{3})	11.8 × 8 × 21.5 in (300 × 200 × 550 mm)
B1.5 Control/Oscillator	100 lb (45 kg)	2,408 cu in (0.03946 m^{3})	14 × 8 × 21.5 in (360 × 200 × 550 mm)
LRU-14	10.5 lb (4.8 kg)	195 cu in (0.00320 m^{3})	3.5 × 8.25 × 6.75 in (89 × 210 × 171 mm)

== Variants ==
- AN/ALQ-135D — Used by F-15E Strike Eagle
- AN/ALQ-135M — export version used by F-15K Slam Eagle

== See also ==
- List of military electronics of the United States
- AN/ALQ-99
- AN/ALQ-144
- Similar US military aircraft ECM systems
