= General Dynamics–Grumman EF-111A Raven =

Electronic warfare aircraft

EF-111A Raven
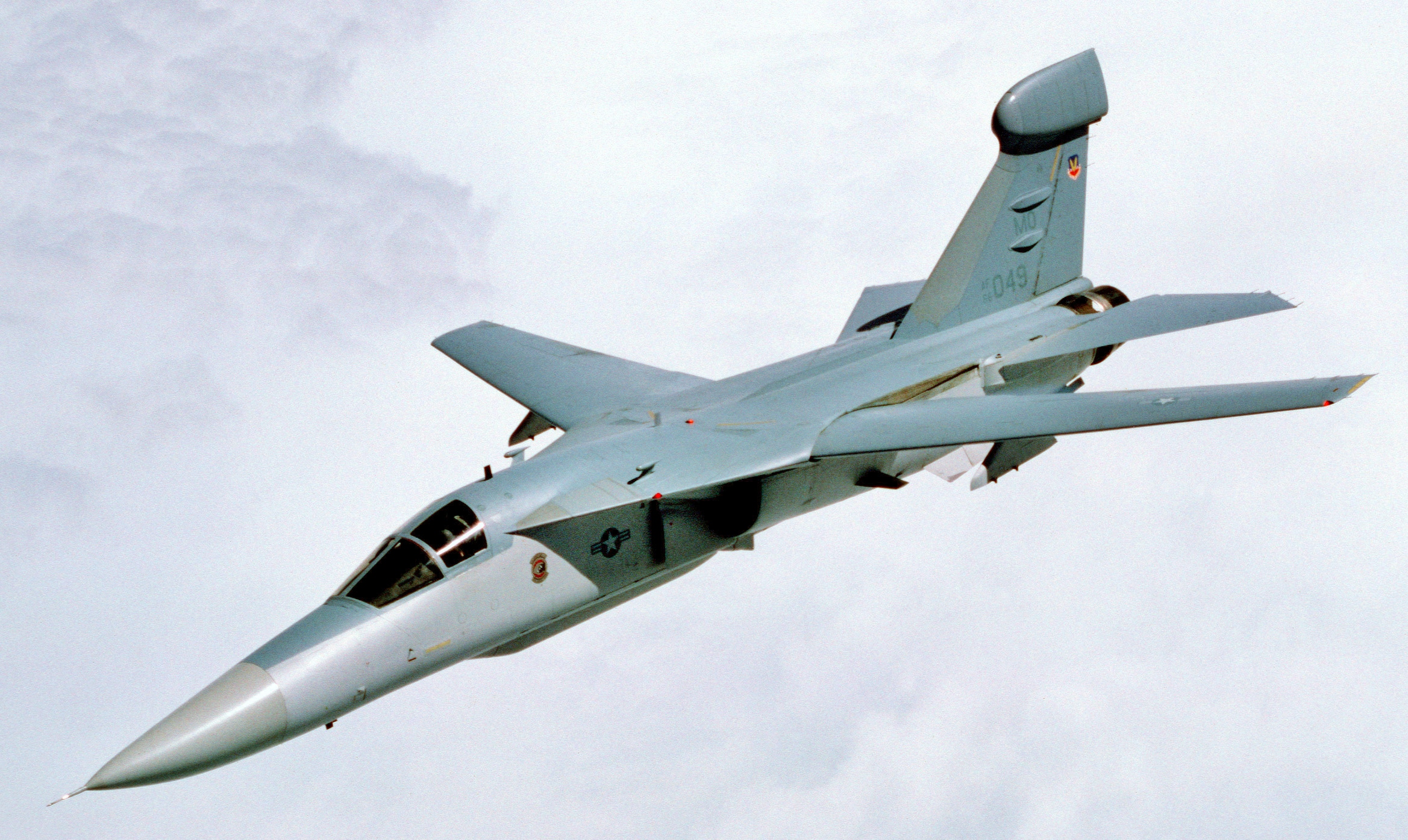
- An EF-111A Raven electronic warfare aircraft

General information
- Type: Electronic warfare
- Manufacturer: General Dynamics, conversion by Grumman
- Status: Retired
- Primary user: United States Air Force
- Number built: 42

History
- Introduction date: 1983
- First flight: 10 March 1977
- Retired: May 1998
- Developed from: General Dynamics F-111 Aardvark

The General Dynamics–Grumman EF-111A Raven is a retired electronic-warfare aircraft that was designed and produced by the American aerospace manufacturers General Dynamics and Grumman. It was operated exclusively by the United States Air Force (USAF); its crews and maintainers often called it the "Spark-Vark", a play on the General Dynamics F-111's "Aardvark" nickname.

Development commenced during the 1970s to replace the EB-66s and EB-57s then in service with the USAF. Both Grumman and General Dynamics were issued contracts in 1974 to convert several existing General Dynamics F-111As into supersonic-capable electronic warfare/electronic countermeasures (ECM) aircraft. (Note: Development of the EF-111A Raven ["Spark Varks"] began in 1974 when the USAF awarded electronic warfare study contracts to Grumman and General Dynamics in January 1974.) The USAF had opted to develop a derivative of the F-111 due to its greater penetrating power over the Navy / Marine Corps Grumman EA-6B Prowler. The resulting aircraft retained numerous systems of the F-111A and lacked armaments, relying entirely upon its speed and electronic warfare capabilities.

The maiden flight of the prototype EF-111 took place on 10 March 1977; the type attained initial operational capability six years later. Delivery of the last aircraft took place during 1985. Across its 15-year service life, the EF-111 played an active role during Operation El Dorado Canyon (Libya 1986), Operation Just Cause (Panama 1989) and Operation Desert Storm (Iraq 1991) amongst others. The type was retired during May 1998 amid the military cutbacks enacted under the peace dividend at the end of the Cold War. The withdrawn aircraft were initially placed in storage at the Aerospace Maintenance and Regeneration Center (AMARC) at Davis-Monthan AFB, Arizona; most EF-111s have since been scrapped while four have been put on static display.

== Design and development ==
In the late 1960s, the United States Air Force (USAF) sought to replace its aging EB-66 and EB-57 electronic warfare aircraft. Options studied by the service included the United States Navy's EA-6B Prowlers during 1967–1968. However, the USAF desired a penetrating electronic jamming aircraft capable of supersonic speeds; accordingly, in 1972, it decided to modify F-111As into electronic warfare aircraft as a cost-effective option. At the time, Congress held particular enthusiasm for the type, making this decision politically expedient.

During January 1974, the USAF awarded electronic warfare study contracts to the aerospace companies Grumman and General Dynamics. Grumman was selected as the EF-111 prime contractor in December 1974, then was awarded a contract to modify two F-111As into EF-111 prototypes in January 1975. The first fully equipped model, known then as the "Electric Fox", flew on 10 March 1977. A total of 42 airframes were converted at a total cost of US$1.5 billion. The first EF-111s were deployed during November 1981 by the 388th Tactical Electronic Squadron, based at Mountain Home AFB, Idaho. The final aircraft was delivered in 1985.

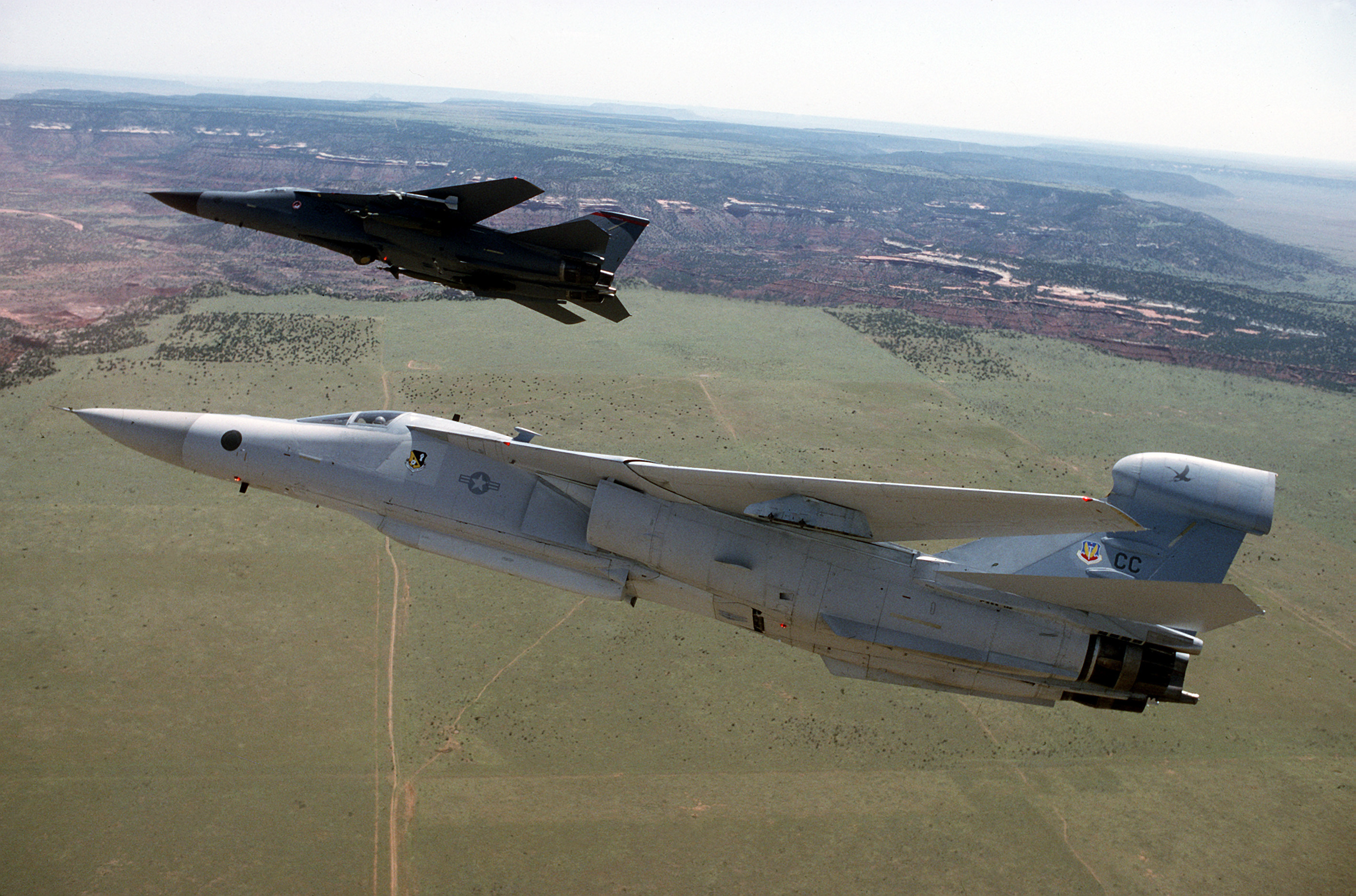
An EF-111A Raven in the foreground with a tail-mounted receiving pod and an underside-mounted transmitting pod, accompanied by an F-111F

The Raven retained the F-111A's navigation systems, with a revised AN/APQ-160 radar primarily for ground mapping. The primary feature of the Raven, however, was the AN/ALQ-99E jamming system, developed from the Navy's ALQ-99 on the Prowler. The aircraft also utilized the ALR-62 Countermeasures Receiving System (CRS) as a Radar Homing and Warning (RHAW) System, the same system carried by all F-111 fighter/bomber models in the United States and Australia. The ALQ-99E primary electronics were installed in the weapons bay, with transmitters fitted in a 16 feet (4.9 m) long ventral "canoe" radome; the complete installation weighed some 6,000 pounds (2,700 kg). Receivers were installed in a fin-tip pod, or "football", similar to that of the EA-6B. The aircraft's electrical and cooling systems had to be extensively upgraded to support this equipment. The cockpit was also rearranged, with all flight and navigation displays relocated to the pilot's side, and flight controls except throttles being removed from the other seat, where the electronic warfare officer's instrumentation and controls were installed.

The EF-111 was unarmed; its speed and acceleration were its main means of self-defense. It was not capable of firing anti-radiation missiles in the Suppression of Enemy Air Defenses (SEAD) role, which was a tactical limitation. The Raven's engines were upgraded to the more powerful TF30-P-9 of the F-111D, which produced 12,000 pounds-force (53 kN) dry and 19,600 lbf (87 kN) afterburning thrust in 1986. Between 1987 and 1994, the Raven underwent an Avionics Modernization Program (AMP), similar to the Pacer Strike program for the F-111F, which saw the addition of a dual AN/ASN-41 ring laser gyroscope INS, AN/APN-218 Doppler radar, and an updated AN/APQ-146 terrain-following radar. Furthermore, cockpit displays were upgraded with multi-function displays.

== Operational history ==
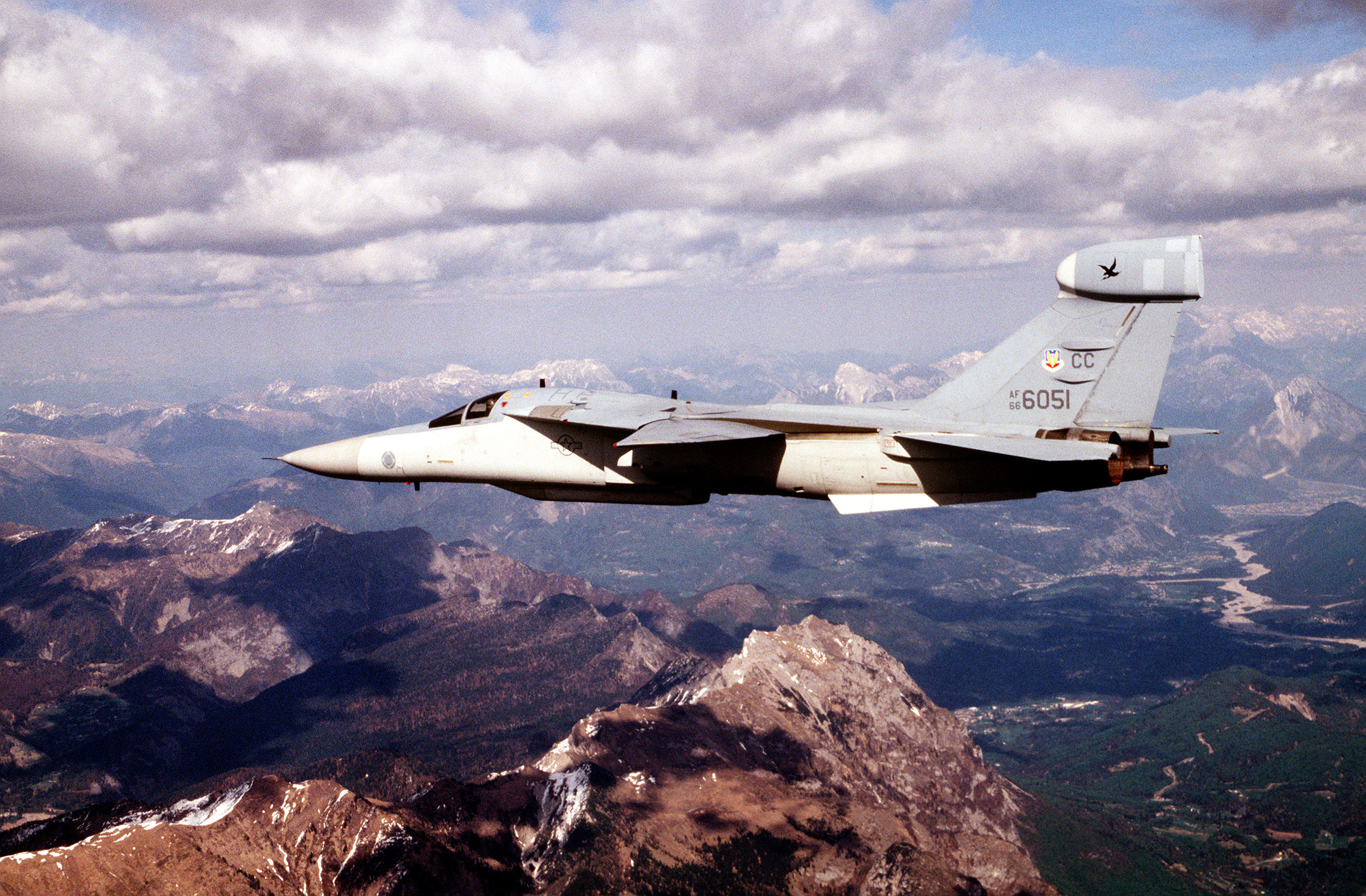
An EF-111 flies over the Alps during Operation Deny Flight

During 1983, the EF-111A achieved initial operational capability. It received the official name Raven, although the aircraft also acquired the nickname "Spark 'Vark" during its service life. The type's combat debut, performed by the 20th Tactical Fighter Wing based at RAF Upper Heyford, took place in Operation El Dorado Canyon against Libya in 1986. During this operation, five EF-111As flew a distance of 3,500 miles (necessitating four aerial refueling actions) before using their electronic countermeasures to disrupt hostile air defenses while other USAF and USN aircraft bombed military airfields, barracks, and other Libyan military facilities. Their next engagement came three years later during Operation Just Cause in Panama; two EF-111As were deployed to jam enemy apparatus.

During 1991, 18 EF-111As conducted combat missions during the Gulf War against Iraq. Typically, the type accompanied strike packages of coalition aircraft flying deep strike missions into Iraq, during which their jammers would disable Iraqi radars. The EF-111A was the only unarmed crewed aircraft to fly so deep into Iraqi airspace. On multiple occasions, Iraqi forces attempted to intercept individual aircraft and, on some engagements, several missiles were claimed to have been fired against them.

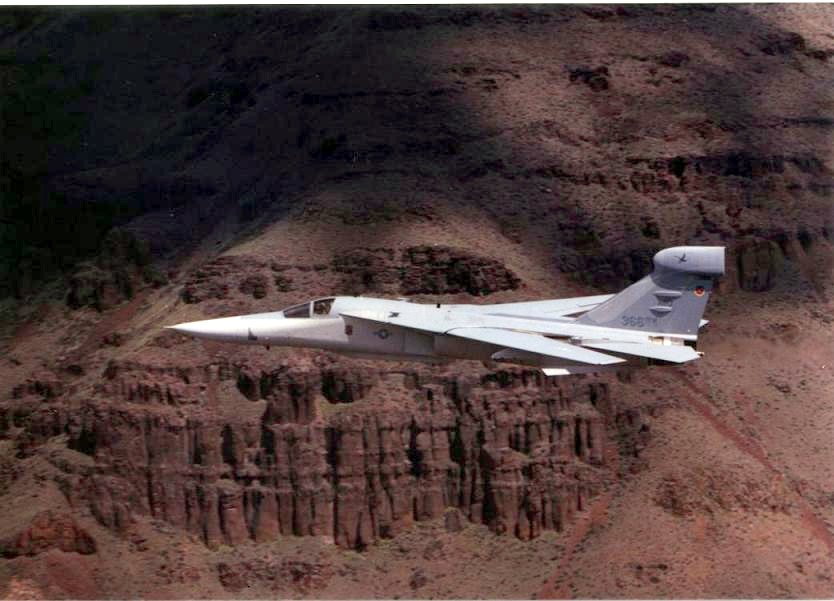
No Coalition aircraft were lost to a radar-guided missile during Desert Storm while an EF-111 Raven was on station.

On 17 January 1991, one EF-111A, crewed by Captain James Denton and Captain Brent Brandon, achieved an unofficial kill against an Iraqi Air Force Dassault Mirage F1, which they managed to maneuver into the ground, making it the only member of the F-111 family to achieve an aerial victory over another aircraft. On 13 February 1991, EF-111A, AF Ser. No. 66-0023, call sign Ratchet 75, crashed into terrain while maneuvering to evade a perceived threat. killing the pilot, Capt Douglas L. Bradt, and the EWO, Capt Paul R. Eichenlaub. It was the only EF-111A lost during combat, the only loss killing its crew, and one of just three EF-111s lost during the aircraft's service. However, it is disputed whether there was an enemy present at the time, as two F-15Es watched Ratchet 75 make violent evasive maneuvers and crash into the ground, with no hostile aircraft in the area.

During the mid-1990s, several EF-111s were deployed to Aviano Air Base, Italy, in support of Operation Deliberate Force in response to the Bosnia War. Furthermore, the Raven also flew missions in Operation Provide Comfort, Operation Northern Watch and Operation Southern Watch in the Persian Gulf.

The final deployment of the Raven was a detachment of EF-111s stationed at Al Kharj/Prince Sultan Air Base in Saudi Arabia until April 1998. Shortly afterward, the USAF began withdrawing the final EF-111As from service, and placed them in storage at the Aerospace Maintenance and Regeneration Center (AMARC) at Davis-Monthan AFB, Arizona. The last EF-111s were retired on 2 May 1998, at Cannon AFB, New Mexico. These were the final USAF F-111s in service.

== Variants ==
EF-111A
Electronic warfare conversion of the F-111A, 42 conversions including two prototypes.

== Operators ==
=== United States ===
United States Air Force

Tactical Air Command 1981–92
Air Combat Command 1992–98

- 20th Tactical Fighter Wing – RAF Upper Heyford, England

42d Electronic Combat Squadron (1984–1992)

- 27th Fighter Wing – Cannon AFB, New Mexico

429th Electronic Combat Squadron (1992–1998)
430th Electronic Combat Squadron (1992–1993)

- 366th Tactical Fighter Wing – Mountain Home AFB, Idaho

388th Electronic Combat Squadron (1981–1982)
390th Electronic Combat Squadron (1982–1992)

== Aircraft on display ==
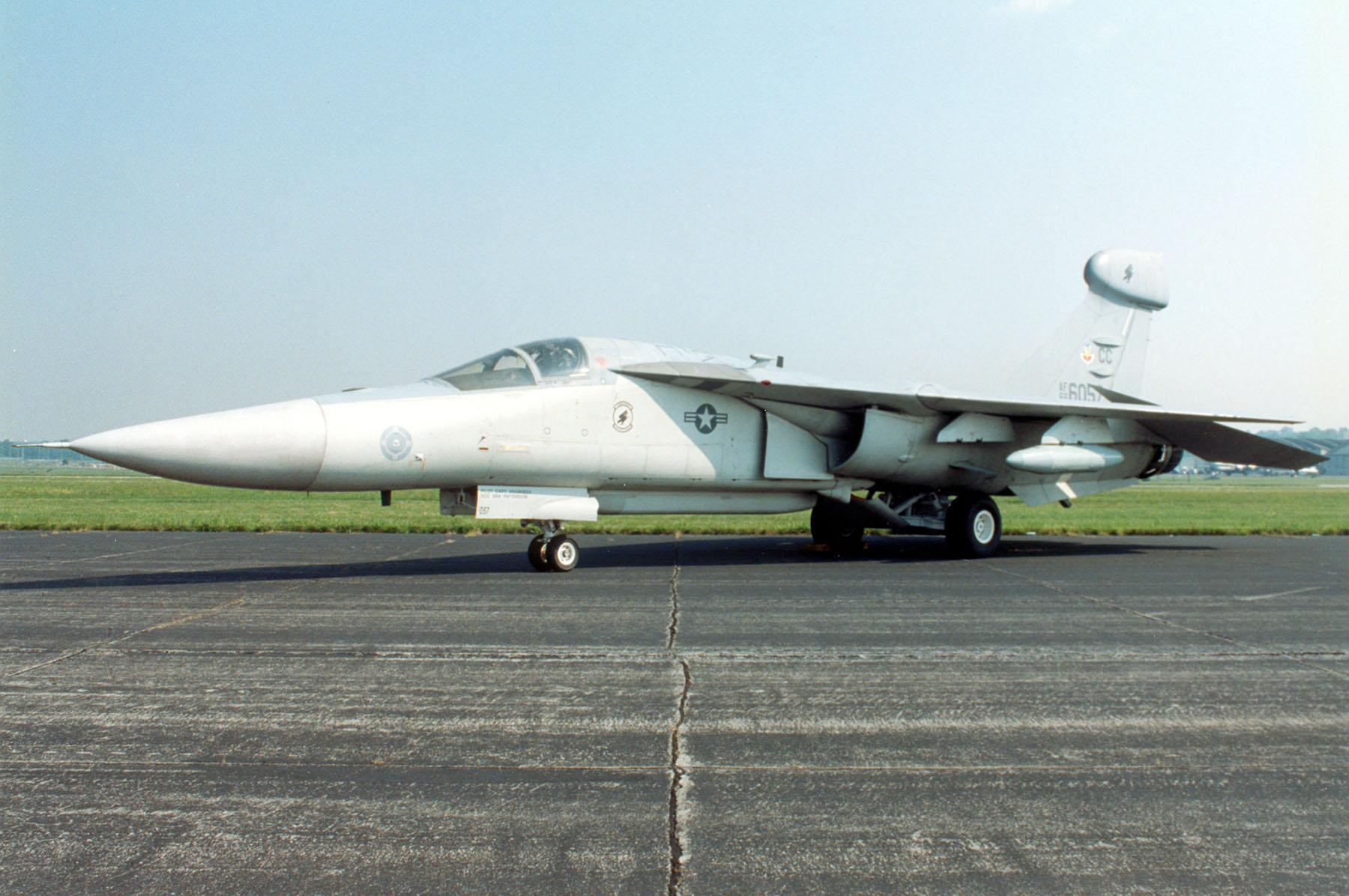
EF-111, s/n 66–0057, on display at the National Museum of the United States Air Force in Dayton, Ohio

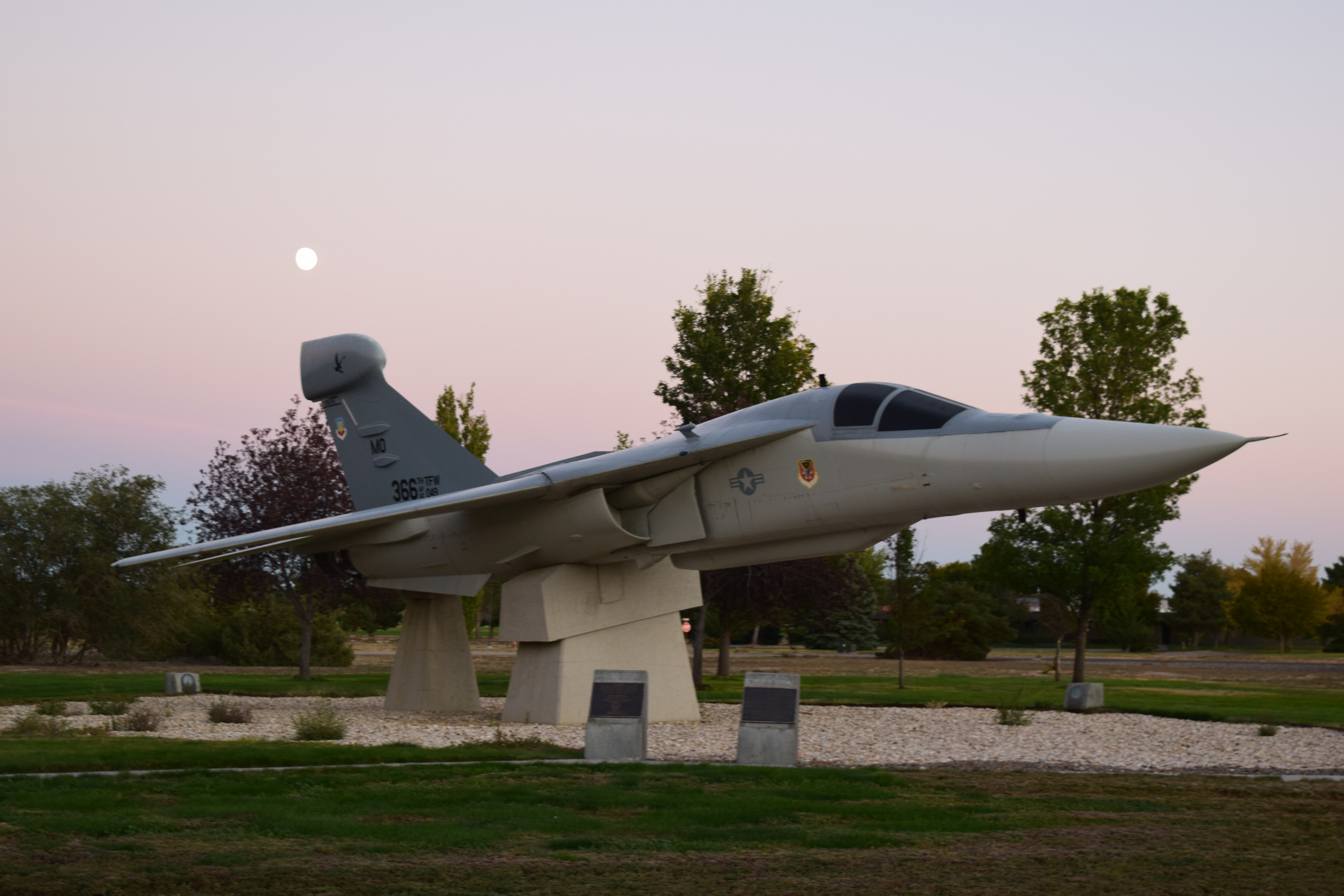
EF-111 s/n 66-0049, on display at Mountain Home AFB, ID

Of the converted aircraft, three were destroyed in crashes, four are on display, and the other 35 were scrapped.

- 66-0016 is on display at Cannon Air Force Base, New Mexico. It was the first EF-111 to fly a combat mission and was unofficially credited with the Mirage F1 kill.
- 66-0047 was being restored at Silver Springs Airport, Silver Springs, Nevada in 2013.
- 66-0049 was the first prototype EF-111 and is on display at Mountain Home Air Force Base, Idaho.
- 66-0057 is on display at the National Museum of the United States Air Force at Wright-Patterson Air Force Base in Dayton, Ohio.

== Specifications (EF-111A) ==
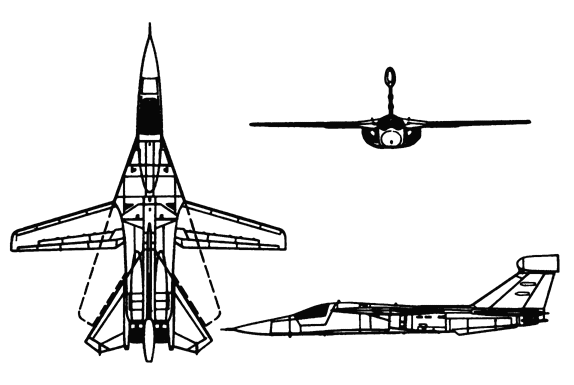

Specifications are for EF-111A except where noted.

Data from The Great Book of Modern Warplanes General Dynamics F-111 "Aardvark" Modern Fighting Aircraft

General characteristics

- Crew: Two (pilot and electronic warfare officer)
- Length: 76 ft 0 in (23.17 m)
- Wingspan: 63 ft 0 in (19.2 m) spread, 32.0 ft (9.74 m) swept
- Height: 20 ft 0 in (6.1 m)
- Wing area: 657.4 sq ft (61.07 m^{2}) spread, 525 sq ft (48.77) m^{2} swept
- Airfoil: NACA 64-210.68 root, NACA 64-209.80 tip
- Empty weight: 55,275 lb (25,072 kg)
- Gross weight: 70,000 lb (31,751 kg)
- Max takeoff weight: 89,000 lb (40,370 kg)
- Zero-lift drag coefficient: 0.0186 (F-111D)
- Drag area: 9.36 ft^{2} (0.87 m^{2}) (F-111D)
- Aspect ratio: 7.56 unswept; 1.95 fully swept (F-111D)
- Powerplant: 2 × Pratt & Whitney TF30-P-3 initially, later upgraded to TF30-P-9 turbofans with afterburner, 19,600 lbf (87 kN) thrust each (TF30-P-9)

Performance

- Maximum speed: 1,460 mph (2,350 km/h, 1,270 kn) ; above 30,000 ft
- Maximum speed: Mach 2.2
- Range: 2,000 mi (3,220 km, 1,740 nmi) (Note: Note: 2,000 miles (1,740 nautical miles) for EF-111A.)
- Ferry range: 3,800 mi (6,110 km, 3,300 nmi)
- Service ceiling: 45,000 ft (13,715 m)
- Rate of climb: 11,000 ft/min (55.883 m/s)
- Thrust/weight: 0.598
- Lift-to-drag ratio: 15.8 (F-111)

Avionics

- AN/ALQ-99 electronic warfare system

== See also ==
- Electronic countermeasure
- Electronic warfare
- Signals intelligence § Electronic signals intelligence

Related development

- General Dynamics F-111 Aardvark
- General Dynamics–Boeing AFTI/F-111A Aardvark
- General Dynamics F-111C
- General Dynamics–Grumman F-111B
- General Dynamics F-111K
- Northrop Grumman EA-6B Prowler

Aircraft of comparable role, configuration, and era

- Boeing EA-18G Growler
- Panavia Tornado ECR
- Sukhoi Su-24MP

Related lists

- List of military aircraft of the United States
