= Synthetic aperture ultrasound =

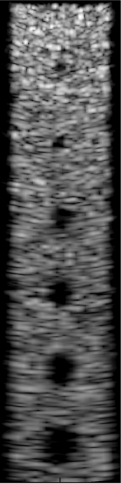
Example of 2-D Slices of 3-D Synthetic Aperture Ultrasound Imaging From Field-II Simulation

Synthetic aperture ultrasound (SAU) imaging is an advanced form of imaging technology used to form high-resolution images in biomedical ultrasound systems. Ultrasound imaging has become an important and popular medical imaging method, as it is safer and more economical than computer tomography (CT) and magnetic resonance imaging (MRI).

Compared with the conventional ultrasound image formation where one transducer or linear array is used, SAU imaging has achieved higher lateral resolution and deeper penetration, which will enable a more accurate diagnosis in medical applications, with no obvious loss in frame rate and without a large burden in computational complexities.

== Background ==
SAU is based on synthetic beamforming and focusing. These are processes whereby the pulse-echo responses from individual pairs of elements are synthesized to reconstruct the formation and focusing, relying on the rule of linear superposition. The working principle of a basic SAU imaging system is one that transmits an ultrasound wave by each small group of all array elements in turn, receive a signal using all possible receive array units, and then reconstruct the image by weighted summation of all demodulated received recordings.

The important advantage of SAU is its ability to achieve dynamic focusing at both transmission and reception without repeating the transmission process with all array elements for each focal zone. It thus saves large computational requirements for delay-and-sum beamforming and leaves space for increasing the frame rate. Also the single transmission and receiving requirement for each firing significantly reduces the hardware complexity for system implementations.

== Motivation and history ==
The basic idea of SAU originated from synthetic aperture radar (SAR) and sonar, where the motion of antenna is used over a region around the target to generate a higher resolution image of the object. In 1972, Burckhardt first put forward the idea that uses synthetic aperture sonar in medical applications and proved that a synthetic aperture system gives a significantly higher lateral resolution than a conventional B-scan.

In 1980, Corl proposed a real-time system implementation for synthetic aperture in medical use. However, at that time, SAU implementations were restricted due to the lack of powerful computational machines at a reasonable cost and size. It was during the 1990s that the development of SAU imaging really began to take off due to the availability of fast computers.

== Imaging theory ==
=== Theory ===
One typical implementation of the SAU is the one proposed by Jensen. In his model, only one array element in the transducer is used each time to emit a nearly spherical wave that will cover the whole region of interest. All elements are used to receive the back-scattered signal at the same time, obtaining a low-resolution for each firing. The back-scattered signal contains information required to form the image in all directions and the specific direction can be acquired by applying different delays to signals received by different elements, thus this process works as dynamic focusing at the receiver. By summing all the low-resolution images acquired each time with a determined weight, the final high resolution image is formed and dynamic focusing at transmission is synthesized.

=== Equations representations ===
Assuming the lth focal line in the low-resolution image acquired from the ith element's firing is represented as:

$$L_l (t; i) = \sum^N_{j=1} a_l (j) r[t - \tau_l(t; i, j)]$$

Here, $a_l (j)$ represents the jth receive element's apodization factor. $r(t)$ represents the received signal and $\tau_l (t; i, j)$ represents the delay applied to the jth receive element when the element receives signal transmitted from ith element, to beamform at a specific direction. So the low resolution image can be represented by

$$\mathbf{L}(t; i) = \begin{bmatrix}
L_1 (t_0; i) & L_2 (t_0; i) & .. & L_S (t_0; i) \\
L_1 (t_1; i) & L_2 (t_1; i) & .. & L_S (t_1; i) \\
. & . & .. & . \\
. & . & .. & . \\
L_1 (t_h; i) & L_2 (t_h; i) & .. & L_S (t_h; i)
\end{bmatrix}$$

By summing up all the low-resolution images, the region of interest for the high resolution image can be represented as

$$\mathbf{H} (t) = \sum_{i=1}^N \mathbf{L} (t; i)$$

The high resolution image is dynamically focused both at the transmission end and the receive end.

=== Imaging efficiency ===
The major concern for the medical ultrasound imaging is the frame rate, which is determined by the number of lines that are formed by the focal points required to reconstruct the image, and the pulse repletion frequency. By considering these two parameters, and assuming the depth of the expected image is 150$mm$ and the propagation speed of sound at 1500 $m/s$, each line will require 200 $\mu s$ to receive the back-scatter information from the farthest focal point. It can be seen that to satisfy the frame with 200 lines each, the frame rate of SAU can achieve a peak at 25 Hz, reflecting the appreciable potential in imaging speed and economy in implementation.

== Extension developments ==
=== Virtual sources focusing ===
Passman and Ermert proposed using transmit focal points as virtual sources and this was further investigated in SAU by later researchers. This method treats the focus of a transducer as a virtual element besides the actual source points. SAU imaging can be performed without regard to whether or not the element actually exists, after the aperture angle of the transducer was determined. By introducing the virtual sources focusing method, the resolution of imaging and depth of penetration were increased. It was also suggested that the focusing in azimuth and elevation can be treated separately and that the concept of virtual sources focusing SAU can be applied in two planes.

=== Sequential beamforming ===
Kortbek has put forward a sequential beamforming method to reduce the complexity and improve the simplicity of the hardware implementation. The basic idea is to separate the beamforming process into two-stage procedures by using two independent beamformers. The beamformer in the first stage produces scan lines by using a single focal point in both the transmit and receive processes. The second stage beamformer creates a set of high resolution image points by combining information from multiple focused scan lines acquired in the first stage. For a linear array transducer with multiple elements, the lateral resolution of sequential beamforming SAU can be made more range independent and significantly improved compared to conventional dynamic transmit and receive focusing.

=== Bi-directional pixel-based focusing ===
The bi-directional pixel-based focusing (BiPBF) method was proposed to solve the problem that SAU imaging suffers from low SNR as the transmission is done by a small part of the array. In BiPBF, the same firing sequence is used in the transmission process as in the traditional array imaging, but the radio frequency (RF) data collected using adjacent groups of array elements are compounded in the receive process. The pixel-based time delays used for compounding are calculated using the distances between pixels and virtual sources located at the successive lateral positions of the transmission focus. Experiments have been done in both phantom and in-vivo experiments; the image quality of the SAU-BiPBF method was considerably improved compared to imaging by conventional dynamic focusing.

== 3D developments ==
With the development of very large scale integrated circuit technologies, large workload of computations became achievable which made real-time 3D ultrasound imaging possible. Much research showed that 3D imaging which generates volumetric images, will result in better medical interpretations and more accurate diagnosis than the conventional 2D method. However, the benefits of 3-D ultrasound imaging come with challenges concerning the computational complexities.

3-D imaging requires a 2-D array transducer in which the number of elements can be ten times more than the linear 1-D array transducer. Moreover, the number of scanlines required in a 3-D volume is at least one order of magnitude higher than in a 2-D image in order to form the volumetric display. To reduce the computational complexities, researchers proposed several methods to support the implementation. To replace the traditional 2-D array, 2-D sparse arrays were put forward to reduce the spatial redundancy. The method of preliminary beamforming for reconfigurable arrays was proposed to reduce the number of A/D converters and the front-end complexities. To improve the imaging resolution, separable beamforming for SAU 3D imaging was used to decompose the 2D beamforming as a series of 1-D array processing, which was shown to produce images with comparable quality as the non-separable method. A better performance of these methods and devices will be achieved as the technology is improving in terms of higher computation speed and smaller size.

== See also ==
- Beamforming
- Medical ultrasound
- Phased array
- Synthetic aperture radar (SAR)
- Synthetic aperture sonar
