= Squint (antenna) =

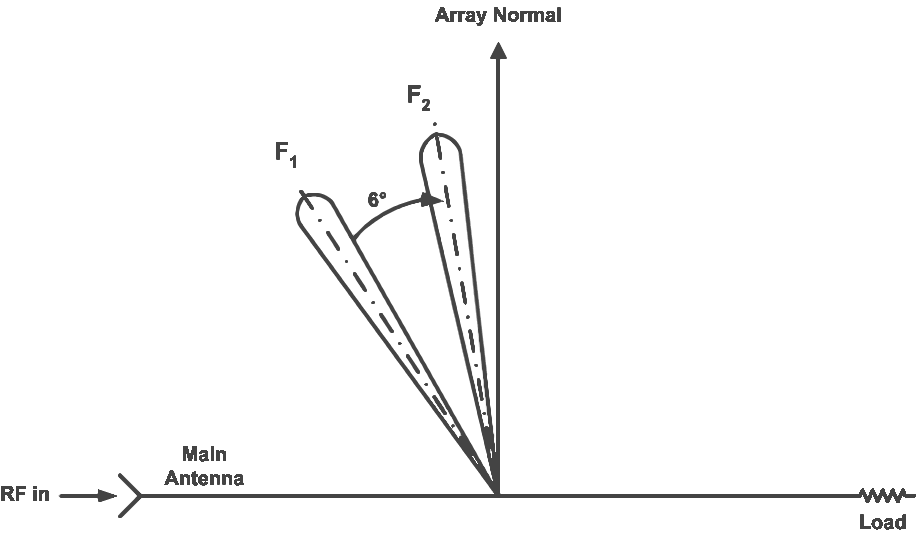
An example of squint caused by two differing frequencies.

In a phased array or slotted waveguide antenna, squint refers to the angle that the transmission is offset from the normal of the plane of the antenna. In simple terms, it is the change in the beam direction as a function of operating frequency, polarization, or orientation. It is an important phenomenon that can limit the bandwidth in phased array antenna systems.

This deflection can be caused by:

Signal frequency
Signals in a waveguide travel at a speed that varies with frequency and the dimensions of the waveguide.

In a phased array or slotted waveguide antenna, the signal is designed to reach the outputs in a given phase relationship. This can be accomplished for any single frequency by properly adjusting the length of each waveguide so the signals arrive in-phase. However, if a different frequency is sent into the feeds, they will arrive at the ends at different times, the phase relationship will not be maintained, and squint will result.

Frequency-dependant phase shifting of the elements of the array can be used to compensate for the squint, which leads to the concept of a squintless antenna or feed.

Design
In some cases the antenna may be designed to create a squint. For example, an antenna which is used to communicate with a satellite but must remain in a vertical configuration. Squint is also required in conical scanning.
