= James E. Service =

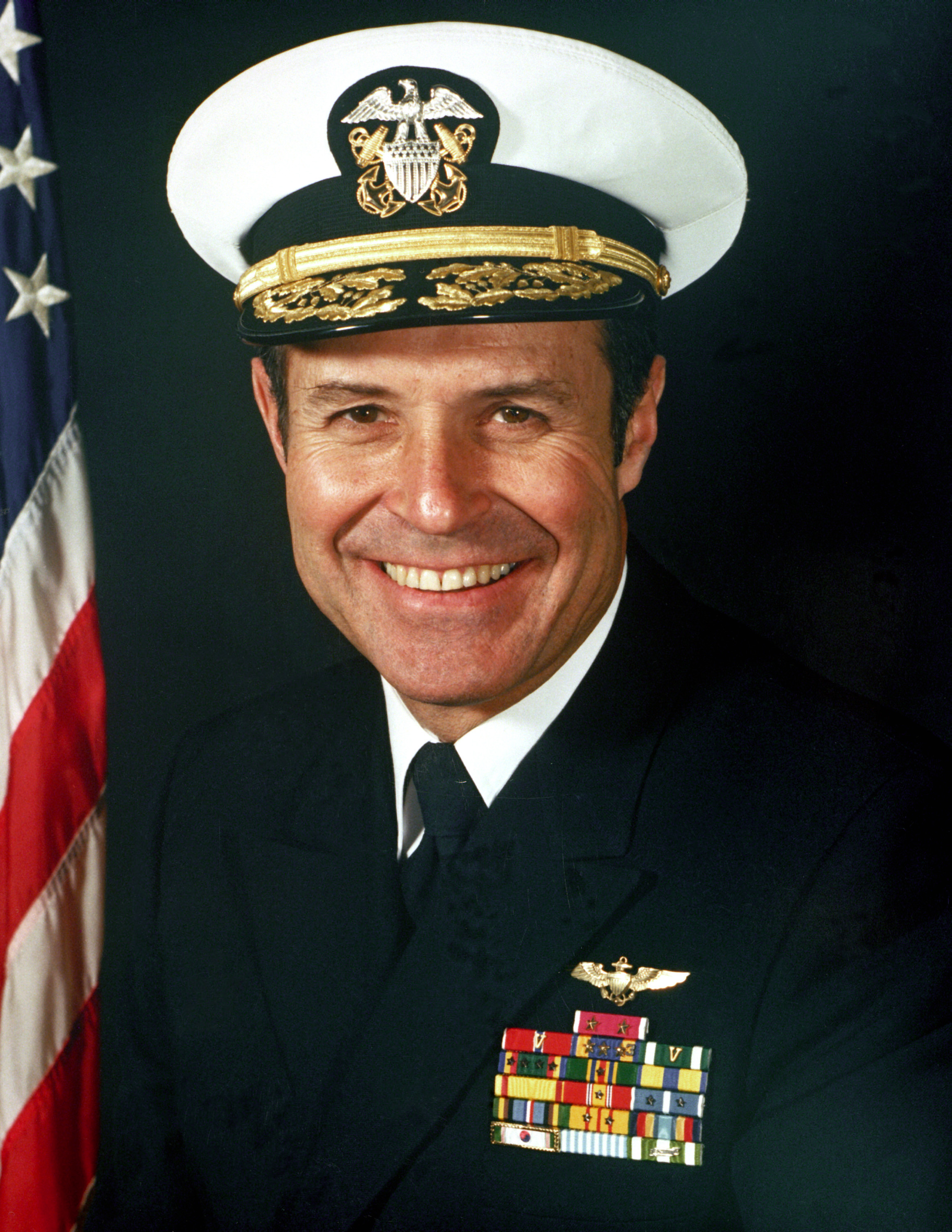
- Born: January 20, 1931; Grosse Pointe, Michigan, U.S.
- Died: February 10, 2017 (aged 86); Carlsbad, California, U.S.
- Military career
- Allegiance: United States of America
- Branch: United States Navy
- Service years: 1950–1955; 1957–1987
- Rank: Vice Admiral
- Nickname: "Jim" "Snake"
- Commands: Heavy Photographic Squadron 62 (VAP-62); Heavy Attack Squadron 123 (VAH-123); USS Sacramento (AOE-1); USS Independence (CV-62); Carrier Group 8; Battle Force Sixth Fleet/Task Force 60; President of the Naval War College; Naval Air Forces, U.S. Pacific Fleet
- Conflicts: Cold War; Korean War; Vietnam War; Pueblo incident; Gulf of Sidra incident
- Awards: Distinguished Service Medal; Legion of Merit (three awards); Bronze Star Medal with Combat "V"; Commendation Medal with Combat "V"; Air Medal (seven awards)

James Edward Service (January 20, 1931 – February 10, 2017) was a vice admiral of the United States Navy active during much of the Cold War. A naval aviator, he flew combat missions in the Korean War and Vietnam War, commanded aviation units and various ships including aircraft carriers, served as a test pilot, and was President of the Naval War College.

== Naval career ==
Service's naval career began in November 1950, when he reported for training in the U.S. Navy's Aviation Cadet Training Program. He underwent training until June 1952, being designated a Naval Aviator on April 9, 1952.

In July 1952, Service reported for duty with Fighter Squadron 53 (VF-53) at Naval Air Station Miramar, California. The squadron deployed to Korea from January to June 1953, where Service flew F9F-5 Panther fighters on 54 combat missions during the Korean War. He remained with the squadron until October 1954.

From November 1954 to July 1955, Service was a flight instructor at Naval Air Station Corpus Christi, Texas. He then left the Navy to pursue studies at San Diego State College in San Diego, California, through January 1957.

Service returned to naval service in February 1957, joining Attack Squadron 151 (VA-151) at Naval Air Station Alameda, California. During his tour, the squadron deployed to the Western Pacific. Leaving VA-151 in February 1959, he spent March through May 1959 at the Catapult and Arresting Gear School at Naval Station Philadelphia in Philadelphia, Pennsylvania.

From June 1959 to June 1961, Service served aboard the attack aircraft carrier USS Ticonderoga (CVA-14). He then was a test pilot at the Naval Air Test Facility at Naval Air Station Lakehurst, New Jersey, from July 1961 to July 1963, making high-energy landing tests of various arresting gear systems and serving in 1962 as project pilot for the Marine Corps Expeditionary Airfield, becoming the first pilot to launch from the CE-1 and CE-2 cataport systems. He then attended the Naval Postgraduate School at Monterey, California, from August 1963 to June 1965.

After instruction in Heavy Attack Squadron 123 (VAH-123) from July 1965 to January 1966, Service served in Heavy Photographic Squadron 61 (VAP-61) in Southeast Asia from February 1966 to November 1967, first as the squadron's operations officer and then as its executive officer. During this tour, he flew 61 combat missions in the Vietnam War in RA-3B Skywarrior photographic reconnaissance aircraft and participated in the development of tactics for the use of real-time infrared reconnaissance systems under combat conditions. He then served a tour as assistant air officer aboard the attack aircraft carrier USS Ranger (CVA-61) from January 1968 until April 1969, during which Ranger served off Vietnam from January to June 1968 and participated in the response to the Pueblo incident with North Korea of January 1968.

From May to June 1969, Service again underwent instruction with VAH-123, before taking command of his first squadron, Heavy Photographic Squadron 62 (VAP-62), in July 1969. He was the squadron's commanding officer until October 1969, then served first as executive officer and then as commanding officer of VAH-123 during his next tour, which lasted from November 1969 to January 1971. He then was executive officer of the attack aircraft carrier USS Independence (CVA-62) from June 1971 to June 1972.

Service attended the United States Army War College in Carlisle, Pennsylvania, from July 1972 to July 1973 before returning to sea as commanding officer of the fast combat support ship USS Sacramento (AOE-1) from September 1973 to April 1975 and as commanding officer of the aircraft carrier USS Independence (CV-62) from June 1975 to April 1977.

Service's next tour was at the Pentagon, where from May 1977 to January 1980 he was on the staff (OPNAV) of the Chief of Naval Operations (CNO). While at the Pentagon, he served first as executive assistant and senior aide to the Vice Chief of Naval Operations (OP-09A) and then, in his first flag officer assignment, as chief of Aviation Manpower and Training (OP-59). He then spent January through May 1980 at the Nuclear Power Training Unit in Idaho Falls, Idaho.

From June 1980 to June 1981, Service was the commander of Carrier Group 8, which operated in the Indian Ocean and participated in the January 1981 release of the American hostages that had been held in Tehran, Iran, since November 1979. From July 1981 to September 1982, he was the commander of Battle Force, Sixth Fleet, and Task Force 60 in the Mediterranean Sea. During this tour, he planned and executed a missile exercise in the Gulf of Sidra off Libya which resulted in two F-14A Tomcat fighters from Fighter Squadron 41 aboard the aircraft carrier USS Nimitz (CVN-68) shooting down two Libyan Sukhoi Su-22 (NATO reporting name "Fitter") attack aircraft during the Gulf of Sidra incident of 19 August 1981. He received the Distinguished Service Medal for this operation.

On October 14, 1982, Service became the 42nd president of the Naval War College in Newport, Rhode Island, During his presidency, which lasted until 12 July 1985, he presided over the college's centennial, the opening of an enlarged Naval War College Museum in Founders Hall after a two-year renovation, and the publication of Sailors and Scholars, a history of the college's first 100 years.

From August 1985 to September 1987, Service was Commander, Naval Air Forces, United States Pacific Fleet, at Naval Air Station North Island in San Diego, California. He retired from Navy service in September 1987.

== Awards and decorations ==

Naval Aviator Badge
| Navy Distinguished Service Medal | | Legion of Merit with/ 2 award stars |
| Bronze Star with Combat Valor Device | Air Medal with 3 award stars and Strike/Flight Numeral 3 | Navy and Marine Corps Commendation Medal with Combat Valor Device |
| Navy Unit Commendation with 4 service stars | Navy Meritorious Unit Commendation with 1 service star | Navy Expeditionary Medal |
| China Service Medal | National Defense Service Medal with 2 service stars | Korean Service Medal with 2 campaign stars |
| Armed Forces Expeditionary Medal | Vietnam Service Medal with 2 campaign stars | Navy Sea Service Deployment Ribbon |
| Presidential Unit Citation (Korea) | United Nations Korea Medal | Republic of Vietnam Campaign Medal |

== Personal life ==
Service was married to the former Natalie Harpst. They have three sons, two of whom became naval officers, one a naval aviator, the other a naval flight officer and aviation physiologist.

== Retirement ==
In retirement, Service was a director of the Wood River Medical Center in Ketchum, Idaho, from 1991 to 1995 and served as a financial adviser for the PGR Advisors consulting group in San Jose, California. Starting in 1992, Service sat on the board of directors of the Sturm, Ruger Company, Inc. and was its chairman from 2006 to 2010. He served as "Chairman Emeritus of the Board" from 2010 until his death on February 10, 2017, at the age of 86.

Military offices
| Preceded by Edward F. Welch, Jr. | President of the Naval War College; 14 October 1982–12 July 1985 | Succeeded by Ronald F. Marryott |
