= 308 Squadron =

308 Squadron may refer to:

- No. 308 Polish Fighter Squadron, a World War II Polish unit in the Royal Air Force
- 308th Aero Squadron, an aero squadron in the Air Service, United States Army
- 308th Air Refueling Squadron, United States Air Force
- 308th Fighter Squadron, United States
- 308th Rescue Squadron, United States Air Force
- 308th Troop Carrier Squadron, United States Army Air Forces
- VAK-308, United States Navy
- VAQ-308, United States Navy
