= VP-29 (1946–1955) =

Patrol Squadron 29
- Active: 6 July 1946 – 1 November 1955
- Country: United States
- Branch: United States Navy
- Role: Maritime patrol
- Size: Squadron
- Engagements: Korean War

Aircraft flown
- Patrol: PV-2; PBY-5A; P2V-2/5/6/7

VP-29 was a Patrol Squadron of the U.S. Navy. The squadron was established as Patrol Squadron 911 (VP-911) on 6 July 1946, redesignated Medium Patrol Squadron (Landplane) 61 (VP-ML-61) on 15 November 1946, redesignated Patrol Squadron 812 (VP-812) in February 1950, redesignated Patrol Squadron 29 (VP-29) on 27 August 1952 and disestablished on 1 November 1955. It was the second squadron to be designated VP-29, the first VP-29 was disestablished on 18 January 1950.

== Operational history ==
- 6 July 1946: VP-911 was established at NAS Minneapolis, Minnesota, as a reserve training squadron, flying PV-2 Harpoons and PBY-5A/6A Catalinas. The squadron aircraft allowance was nine aircraft, but seldom exceeded more than seven operational aircraft.
- 20 July 1950: The squadron was called to active duty along with 13 other Reserve squadrons as a result of the outbreak of the Korean War on 25 June 1950. The squadron remained at NAS Minneapolis until orders were received to transfer to a new home port at NAS Whidbey Island, Washington.
- 31 July – October 1950: VP-812 settled into its new home port at NAS Whidbey Island and began training for transition to the new P2V-2 Neptune patrol bomber. By October 1950 the squadron had received nine new aircraft from the factory.
- 8 November 1950: VP-812 deployed on its first operational assignment since its recall to active duty, arriving at NAS Kodiak, Alaska, with nine P2V-2s.
- 27 September 1952: The squadron deployed to NAS Atsugi, Japan, providing patrol sector coverage in the Sea of Japan and along the coasts of Korea in support of UN forces.
- January – April 1953: The squadron was classified under "Patrol Squadrons, Mining," reflecting a specialty practiced by only three other Pacific Fleet squadrons (VPs 4, 9 and 19).
- 5 April 1953: The squadron returned to NAS Whidbey Island after completing over 500 combat missions in Korea during a six-month deployment, averaging 40 missions per crew, 500 hours per crewman.
- 1 November 1955: VP-29 was disestablished at NAS Whidbey Island, with assets and personnel utilized to form Heavy Attack Squadron 2 (VAH-2).

== Aircraft assignments ==
The squadron was assigned the following aircraft, effective on the dates shown:

- PV-2 - July 1946
- PBY-5A/6A July 1946
- P2V-2 - October 1950
- P2V-5 - June 1951
- P2V-6 - September 1952
- P2V-7 - May 1955

== Home port assignments ==
The squadron was assigned to these home ports, effective on the dates shown:

- NAS Minneapolis, Minnesota - 6 July 1946
- NAS Whidbey Island, Washington - 27 August 1950

== See also ==
- Maritime patrol aircraft
- List of inactive United States Navy aircraft squadrons
- List of United States Navy aircraft squadrons
- List of squadrons in the Dictionary of American Naval Aviation Squadrons
- History of the United States Navy
