= Edward F. Welch Jr. =

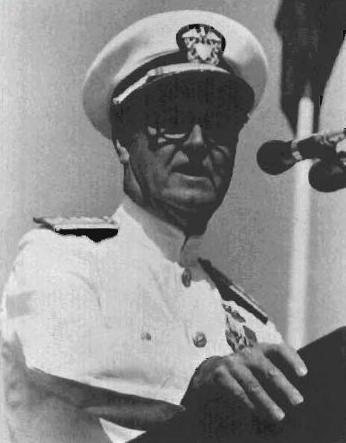
- Rear Admiral Welch during the change-of-command ceremony at the Naval War College as he relieved Vice Admiral James B. Stockdale as college president on 22 August 1979.
- Born: 13 November 1924; Barrington, Rhode Island, US
- Died: 2 January 2008 (aged 83); Alexandria, Virginia, US
- Burial place: Arlington National Cemetery
- Military career
- Allegiance: United States
- Branch: United States Navy
- Service years: 1943–1982
- Rank: Rear Admiral
- Commands: Naval War College; USS Odax (SS-484); Submarine Division 42
- Conflicts: World War II
- Awards: Navy Distinguished Service Medal; Defense Superior Service Medal; Legion of Merit (3)

Edward F. Welch Jr. (13 November 1924 – 2 January 2008) was a rear admiral of the United States Navy active during much of the Cold War. His career included service as a submarine officer, positions related to nuclear warfare planning, arms control, and North Atlantic Treaty Organization affairs, and a tour as president of the Naval War College.

== Naval career ==
Welch was born on 13 November 1924 in Barrington, Rhode Island. He attended the University of Rhode Island and the Massachusetts Institute of Technology before enlisting in the United States Navy in 1943 during World War II. The navy assigned him to the Naval Academy Preparatory School at United States Naval Training Center Bainbridge, Maryland, before he entered the United States Naval Academy as a member of the class of 1948. He graduated in 1947 with a Bachelor of Science degree, and after his commissioning that year he served in the Pacific aboard the destroyer USS Eversole (DD-789) and in the post-World War II occupation of Japan. He attended submarine school in 1949, after which he served first in the submarine USS Sea Cat (SS-399) and then in the submarine USS Balao (SS-285) between 1949 and 1954.

In the mid-1950s, Welch was personal aide to the Commander, Submarine Force, United States Atlantic Fleet (ComSubLant). He then served as executive officer of the submarine USS Grenadier (SS-525), which during his tour was awarded the Admiral Wright Award for forcing a Soviet Zulu-class missile submarine to surface in 1959. He then was commanding officer of the submarine USS Odax (SS-484) from 1959 to 1961.

After leaving Odax, Welch studied international affairs at Harvard University, receiving a master's degree in public administration in 1962. From 1962 to 1964 he served in the Strategic Plans Division of the Office of the Chief of Naval Operations, then on the staff of ComSubLant from 1964 to 1966. He then attended the National War College in Washington, D.C., graduating in 1967, and commanded Submarine Division 42 at Charleston, South Carolina, from 1967 to 1968.

In 1968, Welch was assigned to the Office of the Secretary of Defense, where he handled North Atlantic Treaty Organization (NATO) affairs. In 1969 he became the Deputy Director for NATO Nuclear Planning, a position he held until 1971. He then led the International Negotiations Division of the Joint Chiefs of Staff from 1971 to 1974, during which he was responsible for participation in the Conference on Security and Cooperation in Europe on mutual and balanced force reductions between NATO and Warsaw Pact forces and attended arms control conferences in Helsinki, Finland, and Vienna, Austria.

Welch next was a member of the faculty of the National War College briefly before his promotion to rear admiral in April 1975. He then served in Belgium from 1975 to 1977 on the staff of the Supreme Allied Commander in Europe, General Alexander M. Haig Jr. From 1977 to 1979, he served in Washington, D.C. as Deputy Director of International Negotiations on the Joint Staff with responsibility to the Joint Chiefs of Staff for arms control talks. During this time, he played an important role on the U.S.-U.S.S.R. Standing Consultative Commission in 1977 and 1978 and was part of the delegation that accompanied President Jimmy Carter to the SALT II strategic arms limitation talks summit in Vienna, Austria, in June 1979.

On 22 August 1979, Welch became the 41st president of the Naval War College in Newport, Rhode Island. As college president, he emphasized fleet operations in the college's curriculum and wargaming, instituted the Global Wargame, and established a program under which naval officer students could earn master's degrees – which the college did not offer at the time – by taking courses at other colleges and universities in the Newport area. At his suggestion, the college's Center for Wargaming was included in the college's new Center for Naval Warfare Studies, because he "believed that the wargaming center wasn't being used constructively enough for the Navy, and here was the chance to connect the officers who were going to produce new ideas with the officers who had a means of testing ideas and arguing issues on a grand scale through gaming." During his tour at the war college, Johnson and Wales University awarded him an honorary doctor of laws degree in 1981.

Welch retired from the navy at the end of his tour at the war college on 17 August 1982.

== Personal life ==
Welch was a member of the Naval Academy Alumni Association, the SHAPE Officers' Association, the Naval War College Foundation, the National War College Alumni Association, the Submarine League, the Retired Military Officers Association, and the Rhode Island Honor Society, as well as an honorary brevet colonel in the Artillery Company of Newport, and a past member of the New York Yacht Club.

His wife of 44 years, Rachael Linehan Welch, died of lung cancer on 5 September 1994. They had two children, Mary Welch Rider and James E. Welch. Welch died of congestive heart failure at his home in Alexandria, Virginia, on January 2, 2008, at the age of 83. He was interred in Arlington National Cemetery in Arlington, Virginia.

== Notes ==
Military offices
Preceded by James Stockdale	President of the Naval War College; 1979–1982	Succeeded by James E. Service
