= VAQ-132 =

Electronic Attack Squadron 132
- Active: 1 November 1955 - Present (70 years, 7 months)
- Country: United States
- Branch: United States Navy
- Type: Electronic Attack
- Role: Electronic Warfare
- Part of: Electronic Attack Wing Pacific
- Garrison/HQ: NAS Whidbey Island
- Nickname: Scorpions
- Mottos: First to the Fleet, First to the Fight
- Colors: #eb2426 #e9e62b
- Mascot: Scorpion
- Engagements: Operation Desert Shield; Operation Deny Flight; Operation Joint Endeavor; Operation Joint Guardian; Operation Southern Watch; Operation Enduring Freedom; Operation Iraqi Freedom; Operation New Dawn; Operation Odyssey Dawn; Operation Unified Protector; Operation Inherent Resolve Operation Southern Spear; Operation Epic Fury
- Decorations: Safety "S" (6); Battle "E" (4); Admiral Arthur W. Radford Award; Prowler Squadron of the Year Award; Golden Anchor Award (2); Silver Anchor Award; Foreign Object Damage Excellence (2)
- Website: https://www.airpac.navy.mil/Organization/Electronic-Attack-Squadron-VAQ-132/

Commanders
- Commanding Officer: CDR. Nathaniel "Stray" Michael
- Executive Officer: CDR. Kenneth “Kitty” Kapp
- Command Master Chief: CMDCM. Anthony D. Bush

Insignia
- Callsign: SCORP
- Modex: 54X
- Tail Code: NL

Aircraft flown
- Bomber: KA-3B Skywarrior (1955-1968)
- Electronic warfare: EKA-3B Skywarrior (1968-1971); EA-6B Prowler(1971-2009); EA-18G Growler(2008-Present)

Electronic Attack Squadron 132 (VAQ-132), the "Scorpions", is a United States Navy aircraft squadron based at Naval Air Station Whidbey Island, flying the EA-18G Growler. The squadron's radio callsign is "Scorp".

== History ==
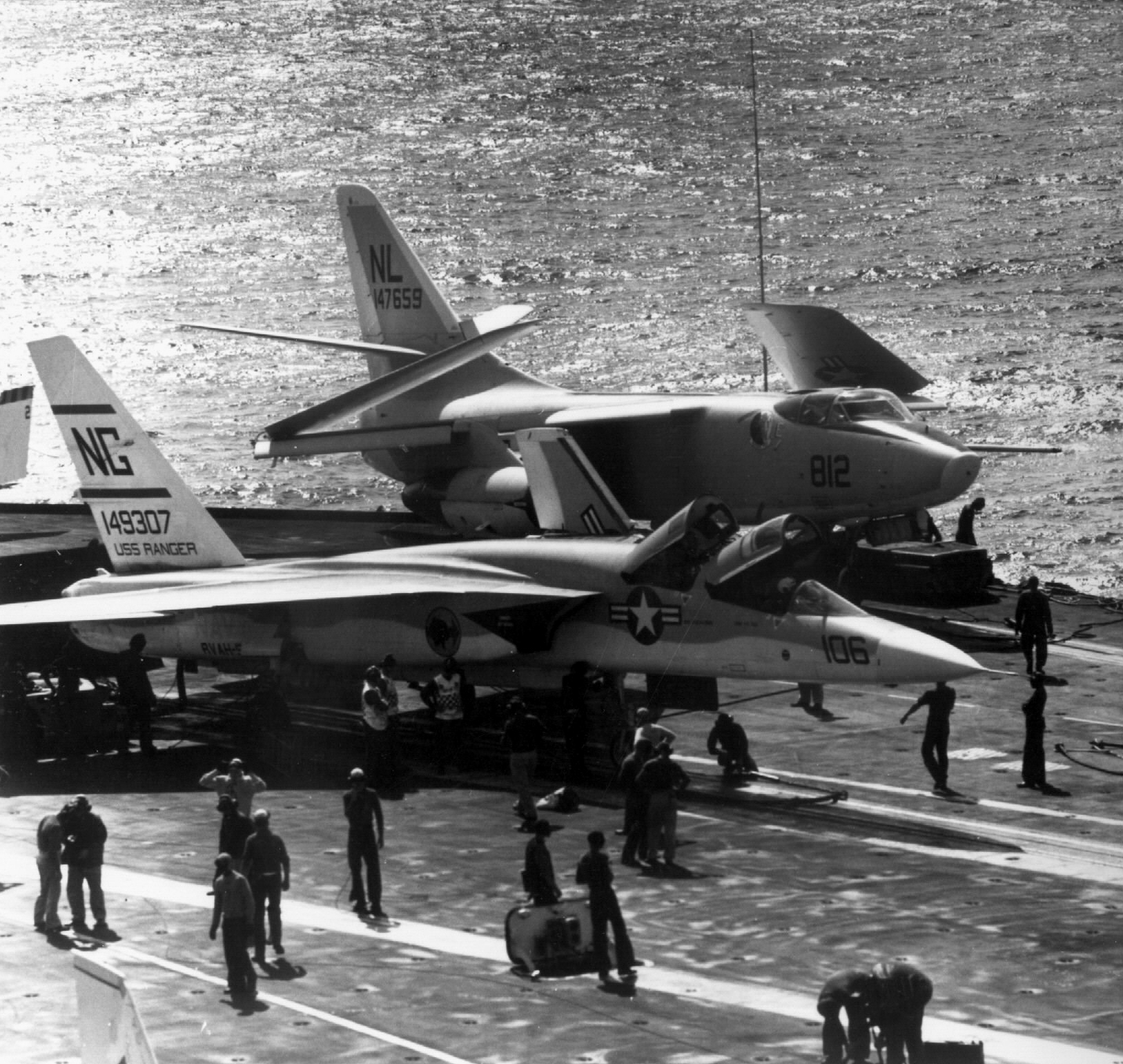
VAH-2 Douglas A-3 Skywarrior on USS Ranger in 1965

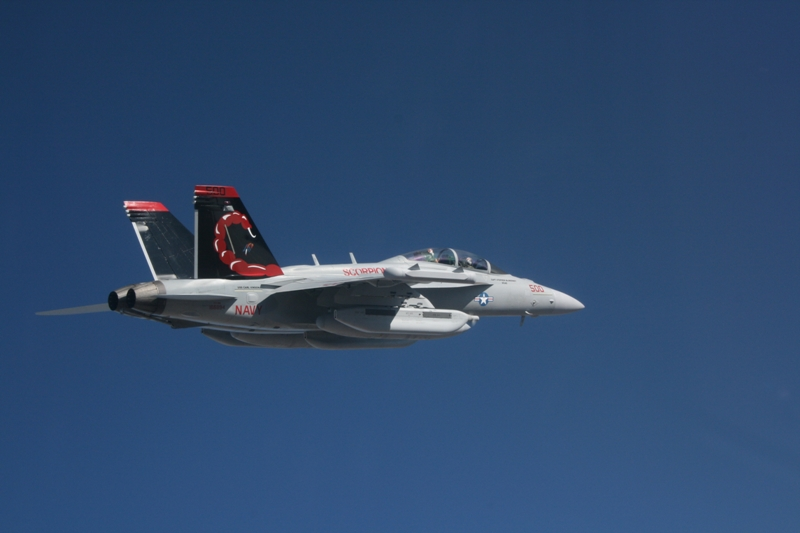
An EA-18G of VAQ-132 in 2009

Electronic Warfare Squadron 132 can trace its history back to Patrol Squadron 911 (VP-911, later VP-29), established in 1946.

=== VAH-2 ===
In November 1955, VP-29 personnel formed the nucleus of the squadron Heavy Attack Squadron Two (VAH-2) "Royal Rampants" and transitioned to the A3D Skywarrior and changed its homeport the following year to NAS Whidbey Island.

During the Vietnam War detachments from VAH-2 were deployed on the following aircraft carriers operating on Yankee and Dixie Stations:

- 5 August 1964 – 6 May 1965, Detachment M A-3Bs were embarked on USS Ranger
- 7 December 1964 – 1 November 1965, A-3Bs were embarked on USS Coral Sea
- 10 December 1965 – 25 August 1966, Detachment F A-3Bs were embarked on USS Ranger
- 29 July 1966 – 23 February 1967, Detachment A A-3Bs were embarked on USS Coral Sea
- 19 November 1966 – 6 July 1967, Detachment M A-3Bs were embarked on USS Enterprise
- 26 July 1967 – 6 April 1968, KA-3Bs were embarked on USS Coral Sea
- 4 November 1967 – 25 May 1968, Detachment 61 KA-3Bs were embarked on USS Ranger
- 3 January-18 July 1968, Detachment 65 KA-3Bs were embarked on USS Enterprise
- 29 May 1968 – 31 January 1969, Detachment 64 KA-3Bs were embarked on USS Constellation

=== VAQ-132 ===
In November 1968, VAH-2 was redesignated as Tactical Electronic Warfare Squadron 132 (VAQ-132) and transitioned to the EKA-3B. In January 1971, they received the EA-6B Prowler and became the first operational squadron to transition to the new aircraft.

On 7 November 2008, VAQ-132 held their ceremonial last flight in the Grumman EA-6B Prowler and began the transition to the brand-new, Boeing EA-18G Growler in February 2009 with flight certification in mid-2009. Initial operational capability (IOC) was achieved on 22 September 2009, making them the first operational EA-18G squadron.

On 5 August 2009, EA-18Gs from VAQ-132 and Electronic Attack Squadron 129 (VAQ-129) completed their first at-sea carrier-arrested landing (trap) aboard USS Harry S. Truman.

The United States Navy's new Boeing EA-18G Growler ( "Grizzly" ) was first used in combat during Operation Odyssey Dawn by supporting efforts to enforce a UN no-fly-zone over Libya. The five EA-18Gs of VAQ-132 "Scorpions" were redeployed from Al' Asad Air Base, Iraq to Aviano Air Base, Italy to support Libya operations.

On 10 December 2025, six EA-18G's from VAQ-132 landed at Roosevelt Roads Naval Station in Puerto Rico in support of Operation Southern Spear.

Following VAQ-132’s support of Operation Southern Spear, the squadron was re-deployed to Jordan’s Muwaffaq Salti Air Base via NAS Oceana and NAS Rota. In late February 2026, VAQ-132 began flying combat sorties against Iranian threats as part of Operation Epic Fury.

== See also ==
- History of the United States Navy
- List of United States Navy aircraft squadrons
