= VAP-61 =

Heavy Photographic Squadron 61
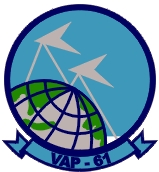
- VAP-61 squadron patch
- Active: 20 January 1951 – 1 July 1971
- Country: United States
- Branch: United States Navy
- Role: Photo-reconnaissance
- Part of: Inactive
- Nickname(s): World Recorders
- Engagements: Korean War; Vietnam War

VAP-61 was a Heavy Photographic Squadron of the U.S. Navy. Originally established as VP-61 on 20 January 1951, it was redesignated VJ-61 on 5 March 1952. It was redesignated as VAP-61 in April 1956, redesignated as VCP-61 on 1 July 1959 and redesignated as VAP-61 on 1 July 1961. The squadron was disestablished on 1 July 1971.

== Operational history ==
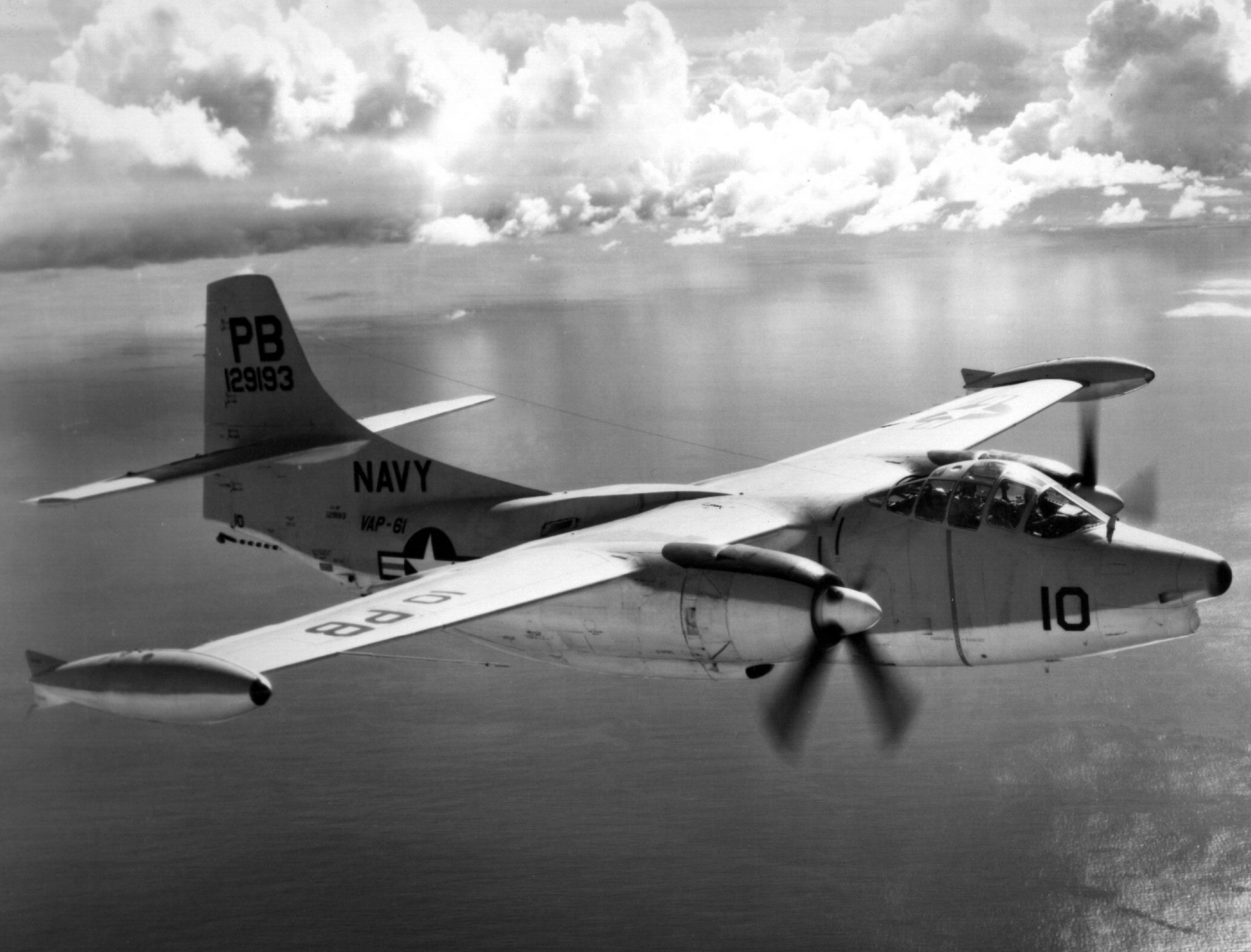
VAP-61 AJ-2P near Guam, c.1956-9

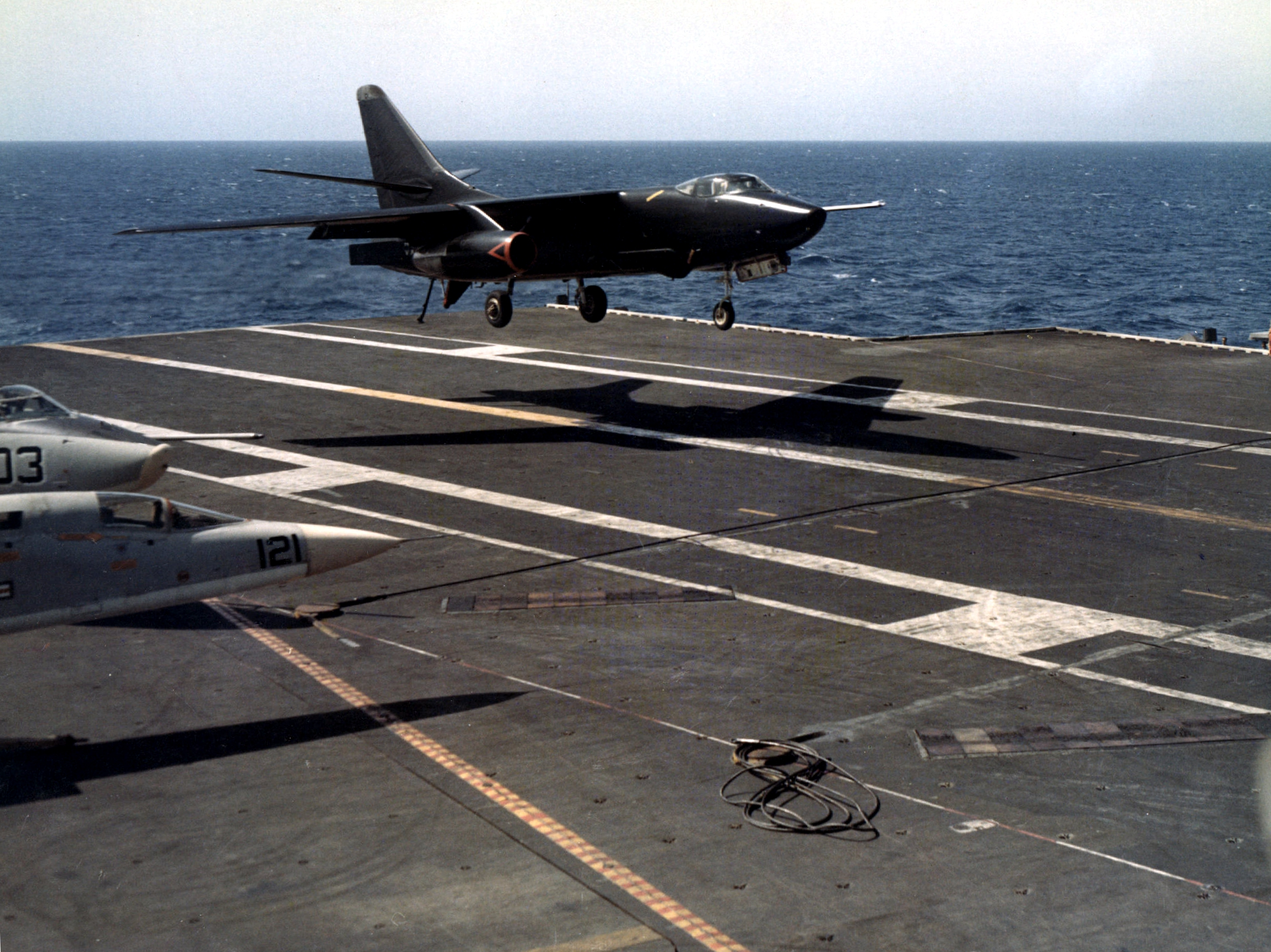
VAP-61 RA-3B landing on USS Kitty Hawk (CV-63) c.1968

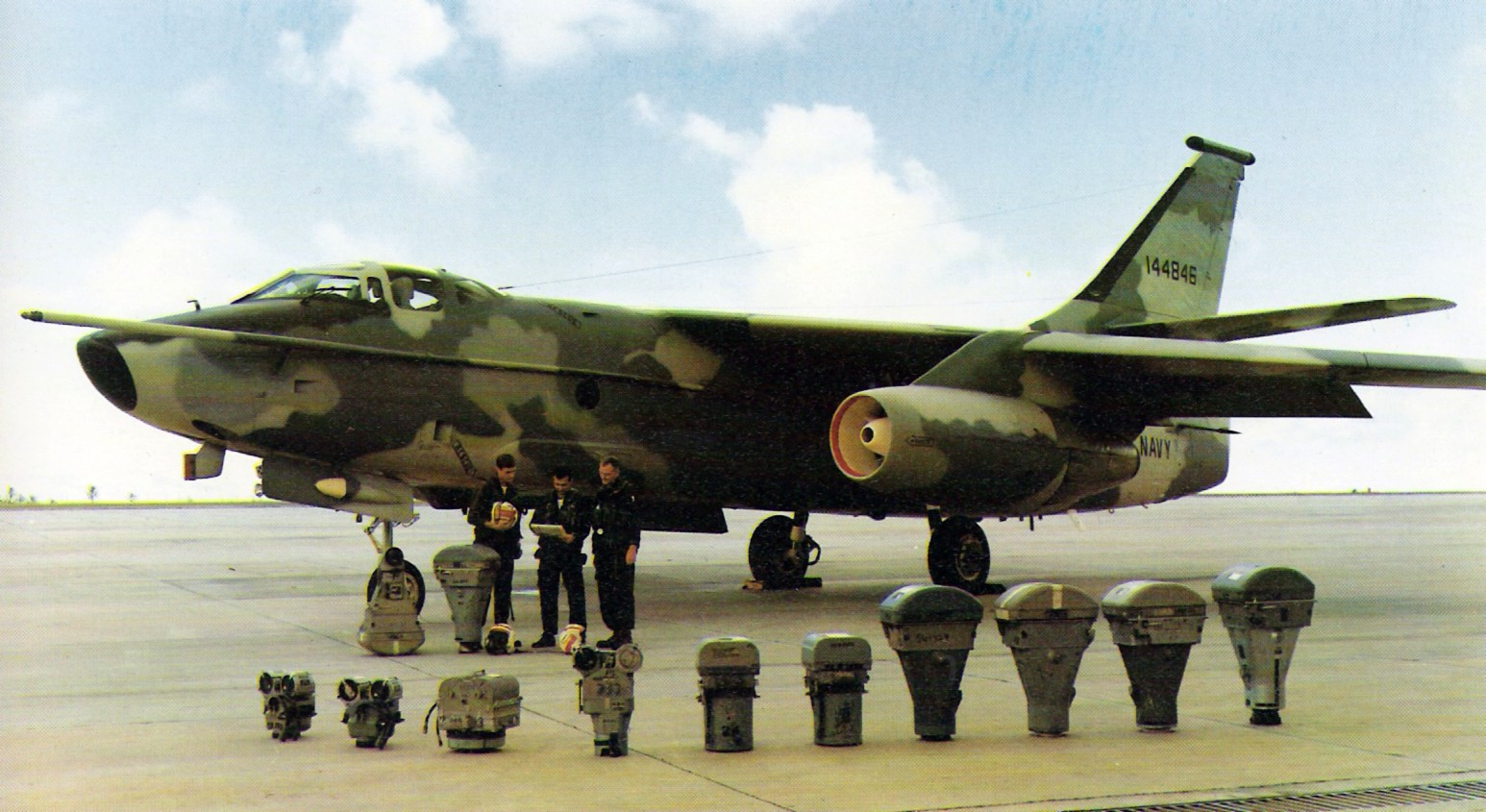
Camouflaged VAP-61 RA-3B at NAS Agana

- March 1951: A squadron detachment was ordered to photograph the Mississippi Delta area and adjacent coastline.
- May 1951: A squadron detachment was ordered to Alaska in connection with mapping Alaska for the U.S. Army Map Service.
- May 1964: Squadron detachments began flying photographic reconnaissance missions from carriers operating in the South China Sea over Laos and South Vietnam as part of Yankee Team Operations.
- 2–5 August 1964: Squadron detachments aboard carriers provided photo reconnaissance support during the Gulf of Tonkin Incident.
- 1965: Squadron detachments continued to operate from carriers in the South China Sea; providing photo-reconnaissance support for Yankee Team Operations, Operation Rolling Thunder and Operation Market Time.
- 13 June 1966: A squadron RA-3B operating from USS Hancock was shot down on a nighttime photo-reconnaissance mission over Hà Tĩnh Province, North Vietnam, the 3 man crew were killed in action, body not recovered.
- 7 August 1966: The squadron flew its first night combat infrared reconnaissance mission over North Vietnam interdicting truck convoys at night.
- 1 January 1968: RA-3B #144847 operating from USS Oriskany was hit by ground fire on a night photo-reconnaissance mission over North Vietnam, its 3 man crew were missing in action, presumed dead.
- 20 August 1968: A squadron RA-3B on an R&R flight to Bangkok went out of control at 25,000 ft and the 3 passengers bailed out. Only two parachutes were observed and two men were recovered. At 10,000 ft the pilot recovered control of the RA-3B and flew it back to Da Nang Air Base. The other passenger Photographer 2nd Class Charles Lindbloom from VAP-62 was killed in action, body not recovered.
- 31 January 1970: The squadron’s participation in Yankee Team Operations came to an end after 68 months.

== Home port assignments ==
The squadron was assigned to these home ports, effective on the dates shown:

- NAS Miramar – 20 January 1951
- NAS Agana – June 1956

== Aircraft assignment ==
The squadron first received the following aircraft on the dates shown:

- PB4Y-1P/P4Y-1P Liberator - January 1951
- AJ-2P Savage - 14 September 1952
- F8U-1P Crusader - August 1959
- A3D-2P/RA-3B Skywarrior - September 1959
- KA3B Skywarrior - 26 December 1963

== See also ==
- Reconnaissance aircraft
- List of inactive United States Navy aircraft squadrons
- History of the United States Navy
