= Douglas A-3 Skywarrior =

Carrier-based multirole aircraft family

A-3 (A3D) Skywarrior
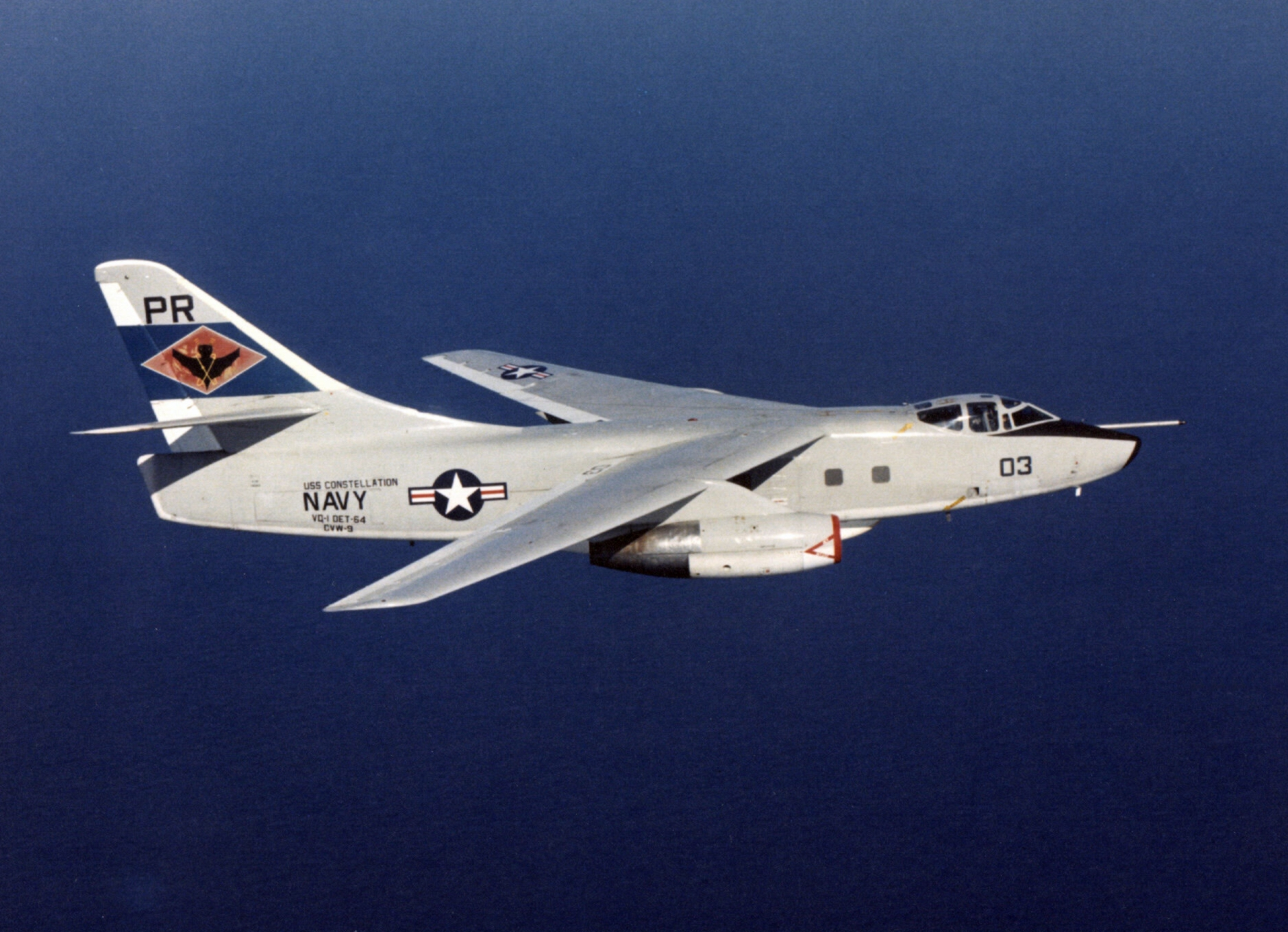
- An EA-3B Skywarrior from VQ-1 over the South China Sea in 1974.

General information
- Type: Strategic bomber
- National origin: United States
- Manufacturer: Douglas Aircraft Company
- Status: Retired
- Primary user: United States Navy
- Number built: 282

History
- Manufactured: 1956–1961
- Introduction date: 1956
- First flight: 28 October 1952
- Retired: 27 September 1991
- Developed into: Douglas B-66 Destroyer

The Douglas A-3 Skywarrior is a jet-powered strategic bomber that was developed and produced by the Douglas Aircraft Company. It was designed by Douglas on behalf of the United States Navy, which sought a carrier-capable strategic bomber. In July 1949, Douglas was awarded the contract to produce its design, having beaten eight other aircraft companies' submissions. Unlike rival designs, which had aimed for a 100,000 lb (45,000 kg) maximum take-off weight, the Skywarrior was developed for a 68,000 lb (31,000 kg) take-off weight, facilitating its use from the Navy's existing Midway-class aircraft carriers. Large portions of the aircraft were produced by the Westinghouse Electric Corporation, including its early Westinghouse J40 turbojet engines, which failed to meet expectations and were replaced by the rival Pratt & Whitney J57 engine by mid-1953. On 28 October 1952, the prototype XA3D-1 performed the type's maiden flight.

On 31 March 1956, the Skywarrior entered squadron service with the US Navy. Initially used in the nuclear-armed strategic bomber role, the emergence of effective ballistic missiles led to this mission being deprioritized by the early 1960s. Throughout the majority of its later service life, the Skywarrior was tasked with various secondary missions which included use as an electronic warfare platform, tactical reconnaissance aircraft, and high-capacity aerial refueling tanker. It was among the longest serving carrier-based aircraft in history, having entered service during the mid-1950s and withdrawn from use in 1991. Throughout its service, the Skywarrior was the heaviest operational aircraft to operate from an aircraft carrier, (Note: the heaviest aircraft operated from a carrier was a USMC KC-130F used in a test from USS Forrestal unarrested and unassisted in takeoff in 1963) which contributed to its nickname of "Whale".

The Skywarrior is one of only three U.S. Navy attack aircraft to enter service in the strategic bomber role. The first was its predecessor, the North American AJ Savage, while the third was the supersonic North American A-5 Vigilante, which initially supplanted the A-3 in the strategic bomber role (1961–1963) but the A-5 was then converted to the tactical strike reconnaissance role.

A modified derivative of the Skywarrior, the B-66 Destroyer, served in the United States Air Force, where it was operated as a tactical bomber, electronic warfare aircraft, and aerial reconnaissance platform up until its withdrawal during the 1970s.

== Development ==
=== Background ===
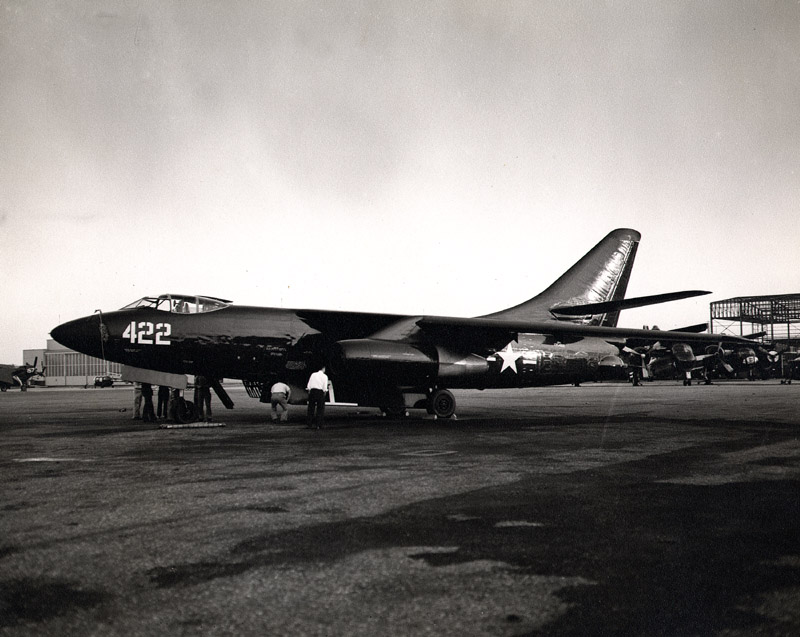
A3D-1 at Naval Air Station Jacksonville, Florida in the 1950s

During World War II, the United States Navy (USN) began to explore the concept of operating jet-powered aircraft from its aircraft carriers. Success encouraged further development of the concept; early in the post-war years, officials within the USN began to investigate the use of jet power as a potential means of operating larger carrier-based aircraft that would be capable of performing the strategic bombing mission. The USN had a growing awareness that it could operate in a broader role than had been previously possible, and that the strategic bomber fleet operated by the United States Air Force (USAF) was unable to reach large parts of the world, a lesser limitation to forward deployed USN aircraft carrier groups and their air wings.

In January 1948, the Chief of Naval Operations issued a requirement to develop a long-range, carrier-based attack plane that could deliver either a 10,000 lb (4,500 kg) bomb load or a nuclear weapon. The envisioned aircraft was intended to be operated from the planned United States-class "supercarriers," which were significantly larger than the USN's existing carriers, thus the specification set a target loaded weight of 100,000 lb (45,000 kg). Additionally, the USN sought for this bomber to possess greater speed and range than its existing North American AJ Savage fleet. A total of eight aircraft manufacturers produced responses to the specification, but all except Douglas Aircraft Company and Curtiss-Wright would drop out, declaring that there was no means that the requirements could be met within the 100,000 lb weight limitation. Uncertainty over the performance and requirements of both engines and bombs were major contributing factors towards this climate of negativity.

Ed Heinemann, Douglas' chief designer, later to win fame for the A-4 Skyhawk, fearing that the United States class was vulnerable to cancellation, proposed a significantly smaller aircraft of 68,000 lb (31,000 kg) loaded weight, capable of operating from the USN's existing carriers. Heinemann had reasoned (correctly) that as technology developed, the size and weight of nuclear weapons would substantially decrease, which increased the rationale for designing a more compact bomber. However, figures such as USAF general Hoyt Vandenberg ridiculed Heinemann's proposal as "making irresponsible claims". During this period, the USN and USAF were vigorous rivals, each seeking to maintain funding for its projects at the expense of the other in a time marked by drastically declining defense budgets; specifically, USAF officials frequently voiced their open opposition to the construction of the United States-class carriers.

=== Selection ===
In late 1948, both Douglas and Curtiss-Wright were awarded preliminary design contracts to further develop and refine their proposals. While Douglas managed to maintain the take-off weight at 68,000 lb, Curtiss were unable to meet the more generous 100,000 lb target during this phase, and thus were eliminated from consideration. During April 1949, the USN's critics succeeded in getting the United States-class carriers cancelled; this outcome validated Heinemann's decision to focus on a design that could operate from the navy's smaller Midway-class aircraft carriers. During July 1949, the USN, recognizing the suitability of Douglas' design, awarded a contract for the production of two flight-capable prototypes and a single static airframe to the company.

Douglas sourced significant portions of the aircraft, including responsibility for the turbojet engines, radar, tail-mounted turret, electrical generators and various other secondary systems, from the Westinghouse Electric Corporation; this heavy reliance on Westinghouse allegedly caused some discomfort to Douglas. In particular, development of the Westinghouse J40 engine proved to be incapable of meeting development schedules or performance promises; Heinemann later commented that "the first thing we learned was that the J40 was not powerful enough". Even prior to the first flight being conducted, Douglas was considering switching to rival manufacturer Pratt & Whitney's J57 engine, which was heavier, but allowed the overall aircraft to be lighter as it used less fuel.

On 28 October 1952, the prototype XA3D-1 performed the type's maiden flight; flown by George Jansen, this initial test flight was carried out with a high degree of secrecy. Early on, the aircraft was found to handle particularly well in flight, in part due to the attention Heinemann and the design team had paid to the hydraulically-boosted control surfaces. On 16 October 1953, the first YA3D-1, powered by the rival J57 engine, made its first flight.

Considerable development problems, largely associated with the original J40 engines, had delayed the introduction of the Skywarrior until 31 March 1956. The A-3 was, by far, the largest and heaviest aircraft ever designed for routine use on an aircraft carrier, though ironically it was the smallest proposal among other proposals that could only be deployed on even larger carriers not yet in service. As had been predicted by Heinemann early on, the Skywarrior had been designed to carry larger and bulkier bombs than it ever would in service due to the rapid improvements made in weapons technology. Despite this, at the Navy's insistence, the aircraft was qualified for an 'overload' payload capacity of 84,000 lb (38,000 kg), the testing of which would establish a weight-related record for carrier operations. Because of its cumbersome size, and less-than-slender profile, it was nicknamed "Whale".

By the end of the 1950s, it was becoming clear that the nuclear mission of the Skywarrior would be passed onto ballistic missiles; however, its high weight clearance and size meant that the aircraft would be useful in various other capacities. Accordingly, large numbers of Skywarriors were retrofitted as aerial refuelling tankers or as electronic warfare platforms; notably, the EKA-3B model could readily swing between performing strike, refuelling, and electronic warfare duties as required. Numerous other models of the type were developed, leading to the type being used for aerial reconnaissance and as a trainer aircraft as well. Production of the type ceased in 1961.

== Design ==
The Skywarrior had a 36° degree swept wing and two Pratt & Whitney J57 turbojet engines. Early prototypes had used the intended Westinghouse J40, a powerplant that proved to be disastrous and was subsequently canceled. The turbojets could be supplemented by a provision for twelve 4,500 lbf (20 kN) thrust JATO bottles. The aircraft had a largely conventional semi-monocoque fuselage, with the engines in underwing nacelles. Flight controls were hydraulic, and for storage below deck, the A-3's wings folded outboard of the engines, lying almost flat, and its vertical stabilizer was hinged to starboard. Capacious internal fuel tanks provided long range.

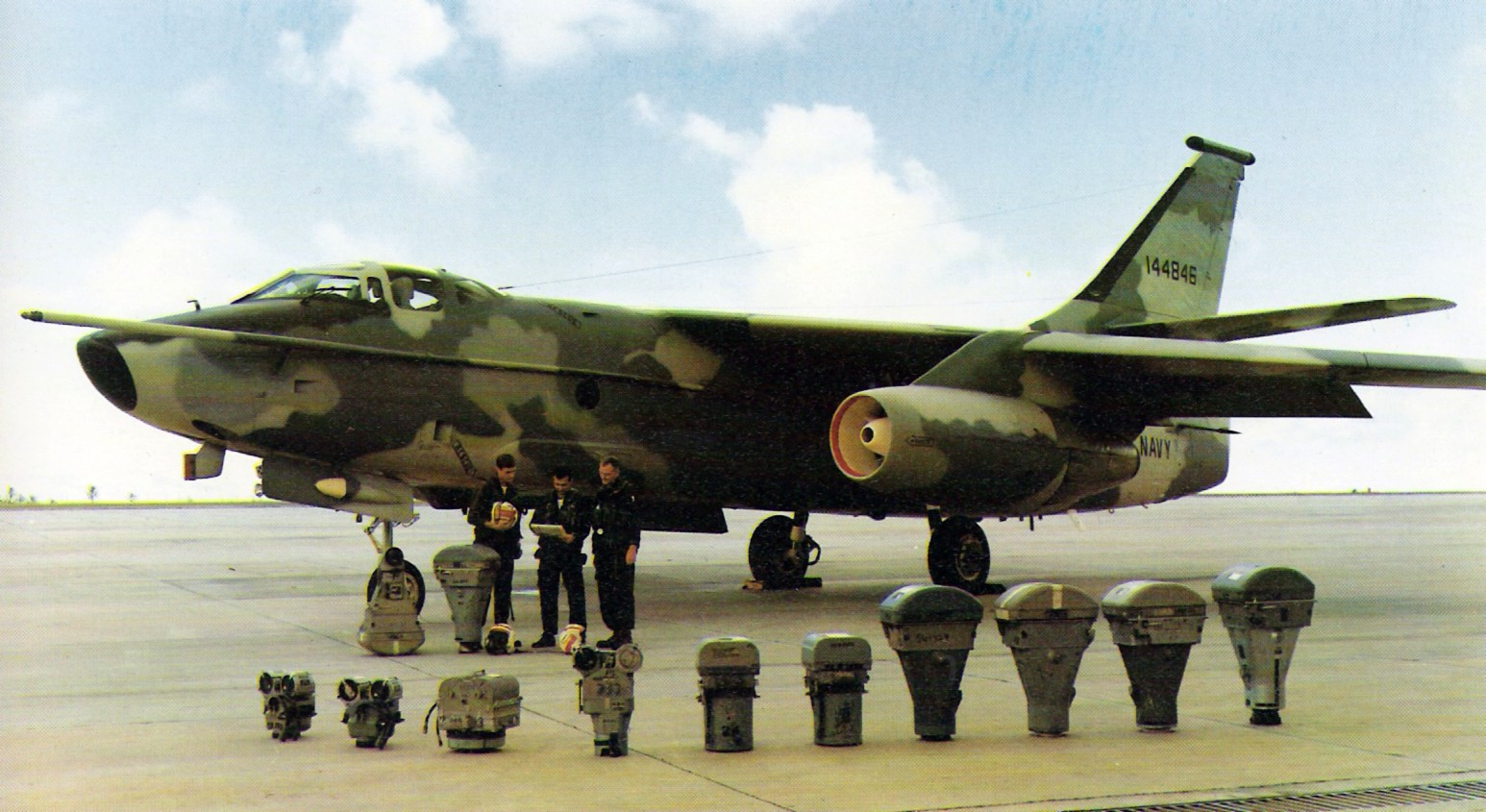
Camera arrangement of a camouflaged RA-3B of Heavy Photographic Squadron 61

The early A-3 variants had a crew of three: pilot, bombardier/navigator (BN) and crewman/navigator (aka: third crewman). An unusual cockpit configuration was incorporated with the three crew sitting under a framed canopy. In the raised compartment, the pilot and bombardier/navigator sat in a side-by-side arrangement with the pilot's station on the port side having full flight controls. On initial variants, a third crew member, who also acted as a gunner for the twin tail-mounted 20mm cannon that briefly equipped the original bomber version of the A3D/A-3A (removed and replaced by ECM equipment), sat behind the pilot in an aft-facing seat. The third crewman station had the sextant for celestial navigation and the defensive electronic counter measures equipment. Later electronic reconnaissance variants could accommodate a crew of seven with the flight crew consisting of a pilot, co-pilot and navigator plus four electronic systems operators occupying stations in the former bomb bay in the spacious fuselage.

Efforts to reduce weight to make the aircraft suitable for carrier operations had led to the deletion of ejection seats during the design process for the Skywarrior, based on the assumption that most flights would be at high altitude. A similar arrangement with an escape tunnel had been used on the F3D Skyknight. Aircrews began joking morbidly that "A3D" stood for "All Three Dead". In 1973, the widow of a Skywarrior crewman killed over Vietnam sued the McDonnell Douglas Aircraft Company for not providing ejection seats in the A-3. In contrast, the US Air Force's B-66 Destroyer, not subject to the weight requirements for carrier operations, was equipped with ejection seats throughout its service life.

The documented history of mechanical failures in the A3D/A-3 showed a rate well above average. Originally, the Skywarrior bombers were assigned to all attack carriers, which included the World War II-era Essex class and the immediate-postwar Midway class.

The Skywarrior could carry up to 12,000 lb (5,400 kg) of weaponry in the fuselage bomb bay, which in later versions was used for sensor and camera equipment or additional fuel tanks. An AN/ASB-1A bomb-director system was initially installed, later replaced by a revised AN/ASB-7 with a slightly reshaped nose. Defensive armament was two 20mm cannons in a radar-operated tail turret designed by Westinghouse, soon removed in favor of electronic countermeasure equipment. Although some bombing missions would be carried out early in the Vietnam War, most bombing would be carried out by more manoeuvrable aircraft, and the Skywarrior would serve mostly as a tanker and electronic warfare support aircraft.

== Operational history ==
=== Nuclear bomber ===
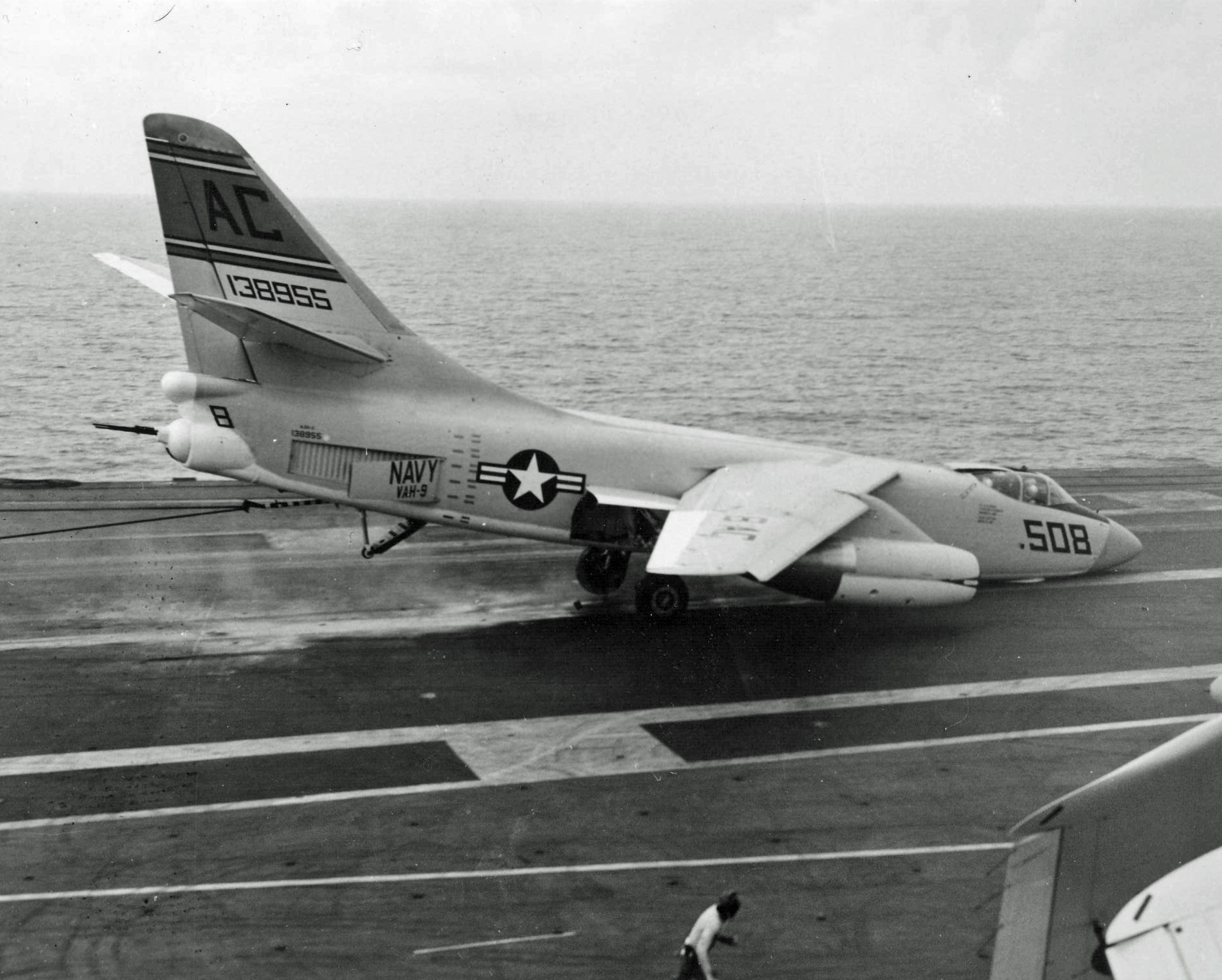
An A3D-2 from VAH-9 suffers a nose wheel collapse while landing on USS Saratoga, c. 1959

Prior to the initial operational capability of the U.S. Navy's Polaris-armed Fleet Ballistic Missile submarines, the A-3 was the Navy's critical element in the U.S. nuclear deterrent. Squadrons were established in two Heavy Attack Wings (HATWINGs), with one wing initially established at Naval Air Station North Island, California before relocating to Naval Air Station Whidbey Island, Washington in December 1957 while the other wing was initially established at Naval Air Station Jacksonville, Florida before relocating to Naval Air Station Sanford, Florida. The wing at NAS Whidbey Island would disestablish in 1959 but the squadrons which had made up the wing would later transition to the EKA-3B variant, eventually forming the nucleus for the Navy's Grumman EA-6B Prowler community, while the wing at NAS Sanford would convert to the A3J Vigilante (later A-5A) in the nuclear heavy attack mission, followed by conversion to the RA-5C and transition to the reconnaissance attack mission. The Vigilante wing would also continue to retain a small number of TA-3B aircraft for training Naval Flight Officers in the Vigilante's radar and navigation systems. The Skywarrior's strategic bombing role faded after 1964, briefly being complemented by the A3J Vigilante. Soon afterward, the Navy abandoned the concept of carrier-based strategic nuclear weaponry for the successful Polaris missile-equipped Fleet Ballistic Missile submarine program and all A-5As were converted to the RA-5C Vigilante reconnaissance variant. Many A-3Bs were converted to a combination tanker-electronic warfare aircraft.

=== Vietnam War era ===
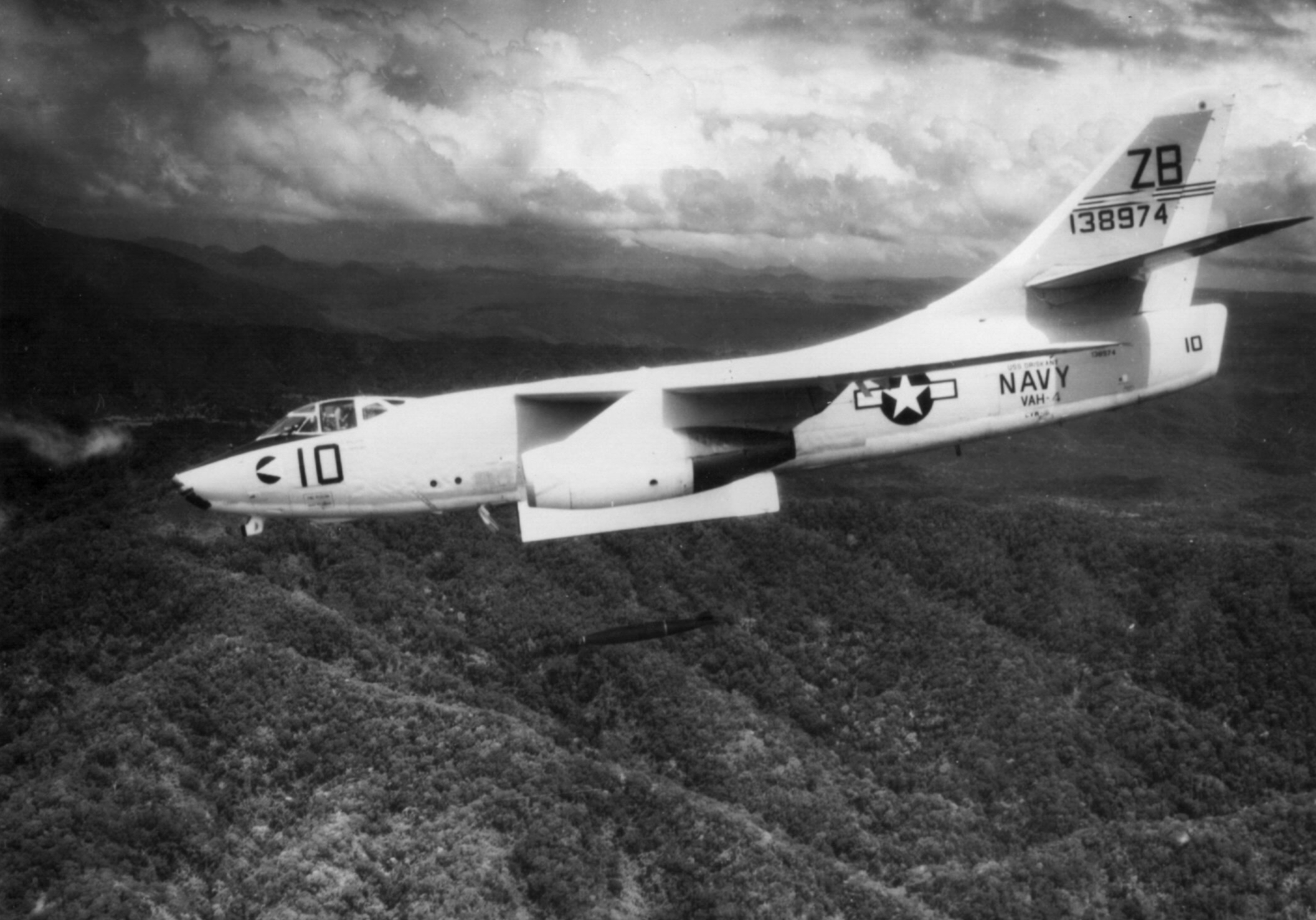
A VAH-4 A-3B from USS Oriskany dropping a Mk 83 bomb, 1965.

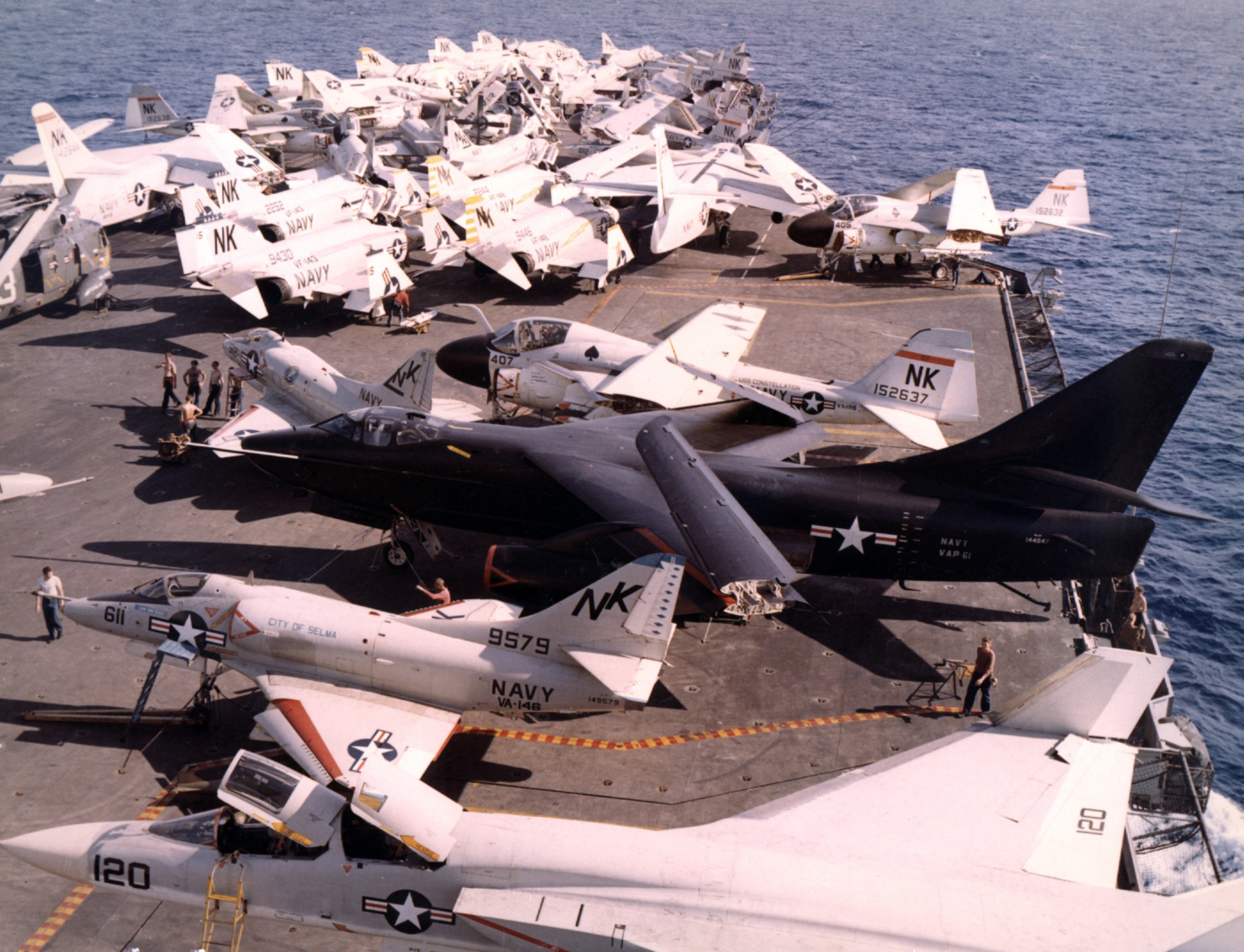
A black RA-3B from VAP-61 aboard USS Constellation, 1967.

Skywarriors saw some use in the conventional bombing and mine-laying role (A-3B) during the Vietnam War from 1964 through 1967, often to deliver Mk84 2,000 pounds (910 kg) bombs. The A-3 found subsequent service in the tanker (KA-3B), photographic reconnaissance (RA-3B), electronic reconnaissance (EA-3B), and electronic warfare (ERA-3B, EKA-3B) roles.

For most of the Vietnam War, EA-3Bs of Fleet Air Reconnaissance Squadron 1 (VQ-1) flew from Da Nang Air Base in South Vietnam, providing continuous electronic reconnaissance capability over the area, including the Ho Chi Minh Trail and all the way north to Haiphong harbor. This was known as VQ-1 Det.B. The aircrew and ground support personnel were temporarily assigned from their home base at Naval Air Station Atsugi, Japan and after 1970, Naval Air Station Agana, Guam. After Det B was disestablished, VQ-1 provided detachments of two EA-3B aircraft that deployed with Western Pacific and Indian Ocean (WESTPAC/IO) bound aircraft carrier battle groups up until the late 1980s when it was replaced by the Lockheed ES-3A Shadow.

In addition, a version of the A-3B was modified into the RA-3B and used in Vietnam as a photo reconnaissance aircraft. Heavy Photographic Squadron 61 (VAP-61) at Naval Air Station Agana, Guam and sister squadron VAP-62 at Naval Air Station Jacksonville, Florida furnished crews and flew out of Da Nang AB performing mapping and intelligence gathering flight over the Southeast Asia area. With 12 camera stations the RA-3B was well equipped to perform cartographic mapping of areas where no detail maps existed. With IR gear installed, the RA-3B was used at night to monitor the movement of troops down roads and trails in Laos. Other locations included Det Tango at Don Muang Royal Thai Air Force Base in Bangkok, Thailand, Det Southpaw at RAAF Base Townsville, Australia, as well as work out of Osan Air Base, South Korea.

==== Tanker ====
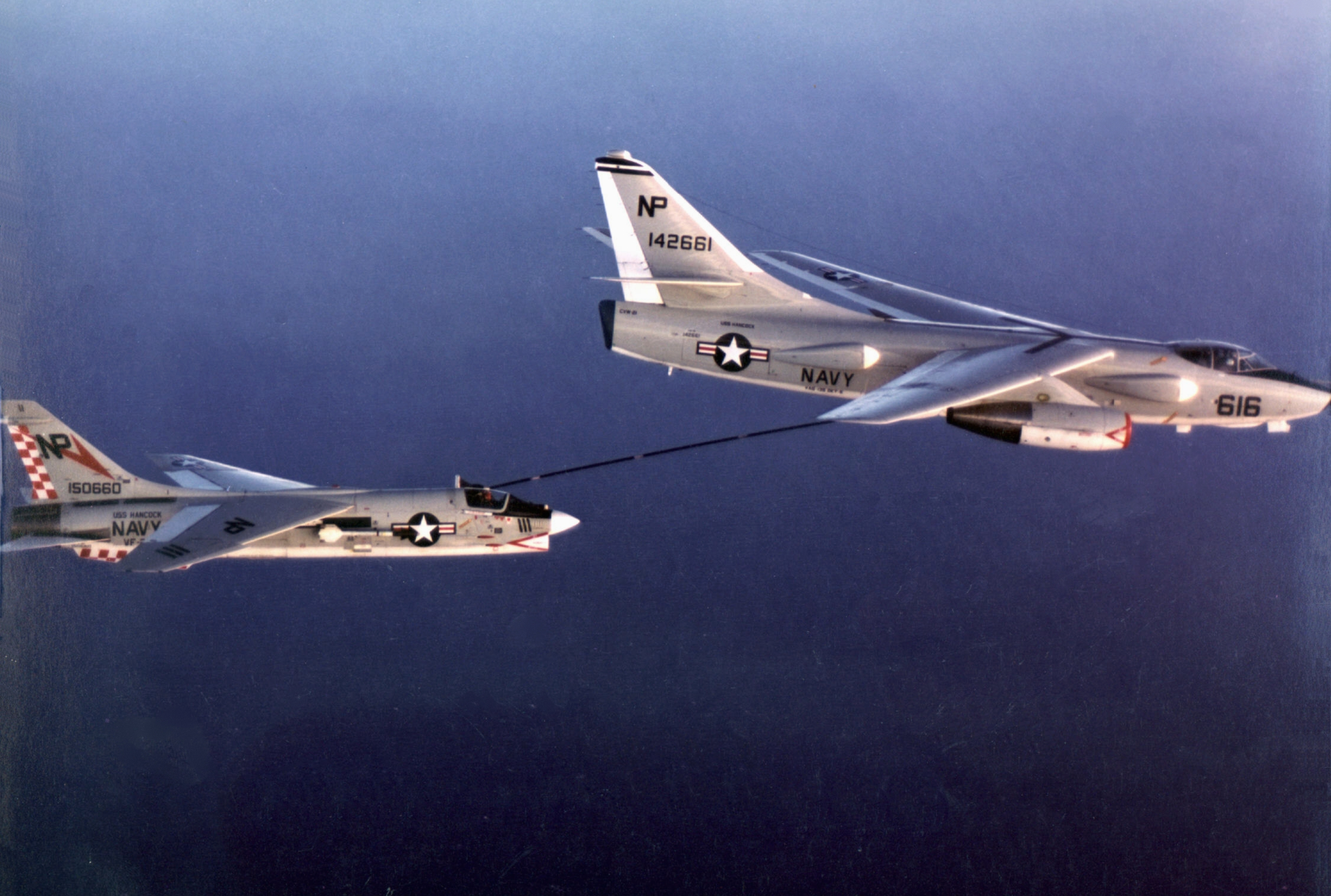
An EKA-3B from VAQ-135 refueling an VF-211 F-8J off Vietnam, 1972.

During the Vietnam War, the A-3 attack aircraft were modified to KA-3B tankers while some were modified into a multi-mission tanker variant, the EKA-3B, which was a real workhorse for the carrier air wing. Electronic jamming equipment was added without removing tanker capability so the EKA-3B could jam enemy radar while waiting to refuel tactical aircraft. Eventually, the EKA-3B was replaced by the smaller dedicated Grumman KA-6D Intruder tanker, which although it had less capacity and endurance, was deployed in greater numbers within the carrier's air wing. Two additional Naval Reserve units were established in the early 1970s as air refueling squadrons, VAQ-208 and VAQ-308, at Naval Air Station Alameda, California. Both units operated aircraft with electronic warfare equipment removed and were redesignated as KA-3Bs. VAK-208 and VAK-308 were decommissioned in the early 1990s. On May 31, 1967, a KC-135 refueled a KA-3 Skywarrior while that jet refueled an F-8 Crusader. This event became the first triple-level aerial refueling, performed in order to save the USN plane which was dangerously low on fuel. The KC-135 crew earned a Mackay Trophy for their feat.

=== Cold War ===
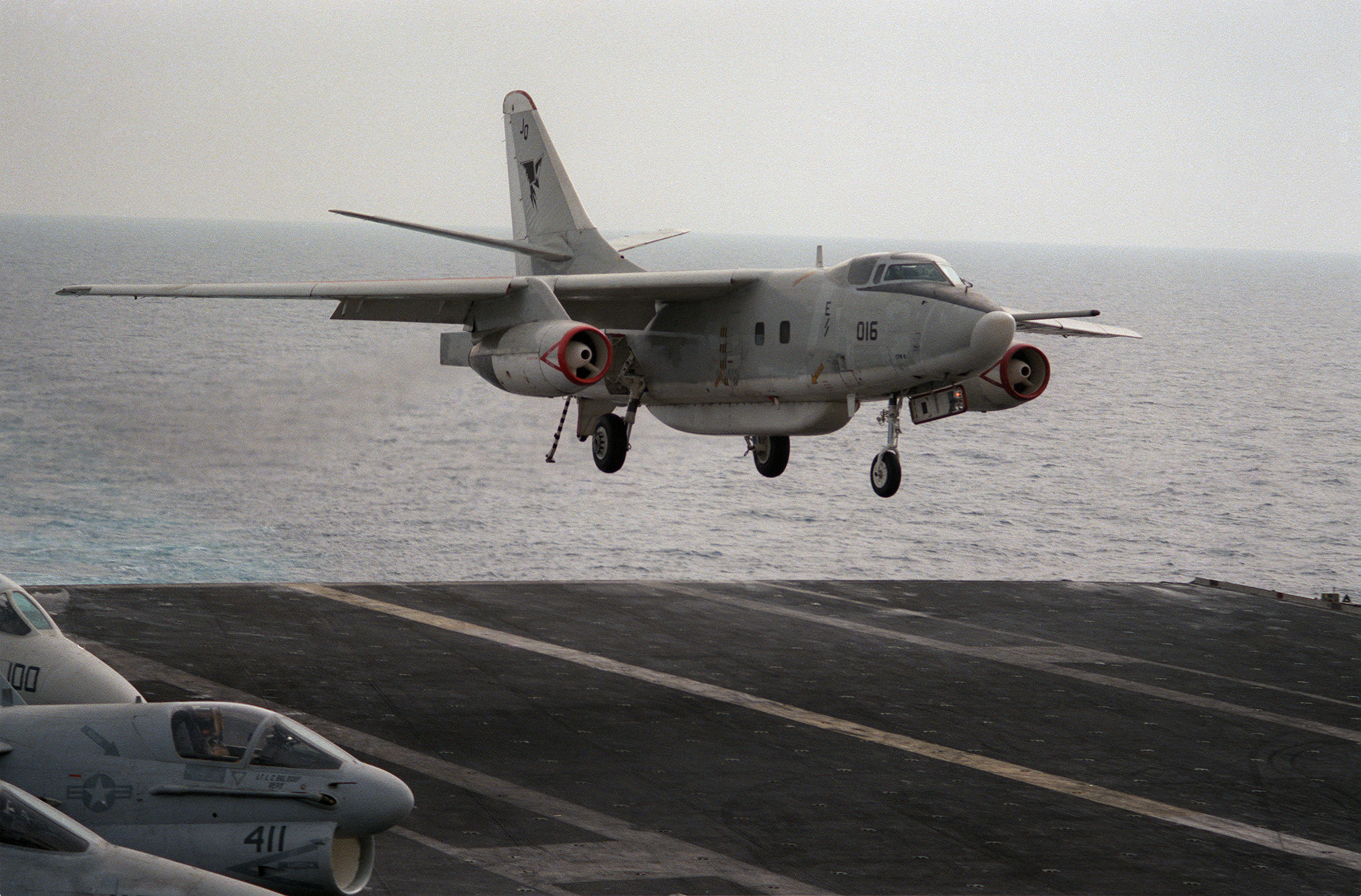
An EA-3B of Fleet Air Reconnaissance Squadron Two (VQ-2) lands on USS Kitty Hawk in 1987

The EA-3 variant was used in critical electronic intelligence (ELINT) roles operating from aircraft carrier decks and ashore supplementing the larger Lockheed EP-3. Its last service as an ELINT platform was during Desert Storm.

=== Reconnaissance ===
The EA-3B variant was modified for electronic intelligence against the Warsaw Pact. Missions were flown around the globe beginning in 1956, with the U.S. Air Force EB-47 Stratojet flying a similar mission. The EA-3B carried a crew of seven, with flight crew of three in the cockpit and an Electronic Warfare Officer and three electronic systems operators/evaluators in the converted weapons bay. It offered unique electronic reconnaissance capabilities in numerous Cold War-era conflicts and the Vietnam War.

=== Retirement ===
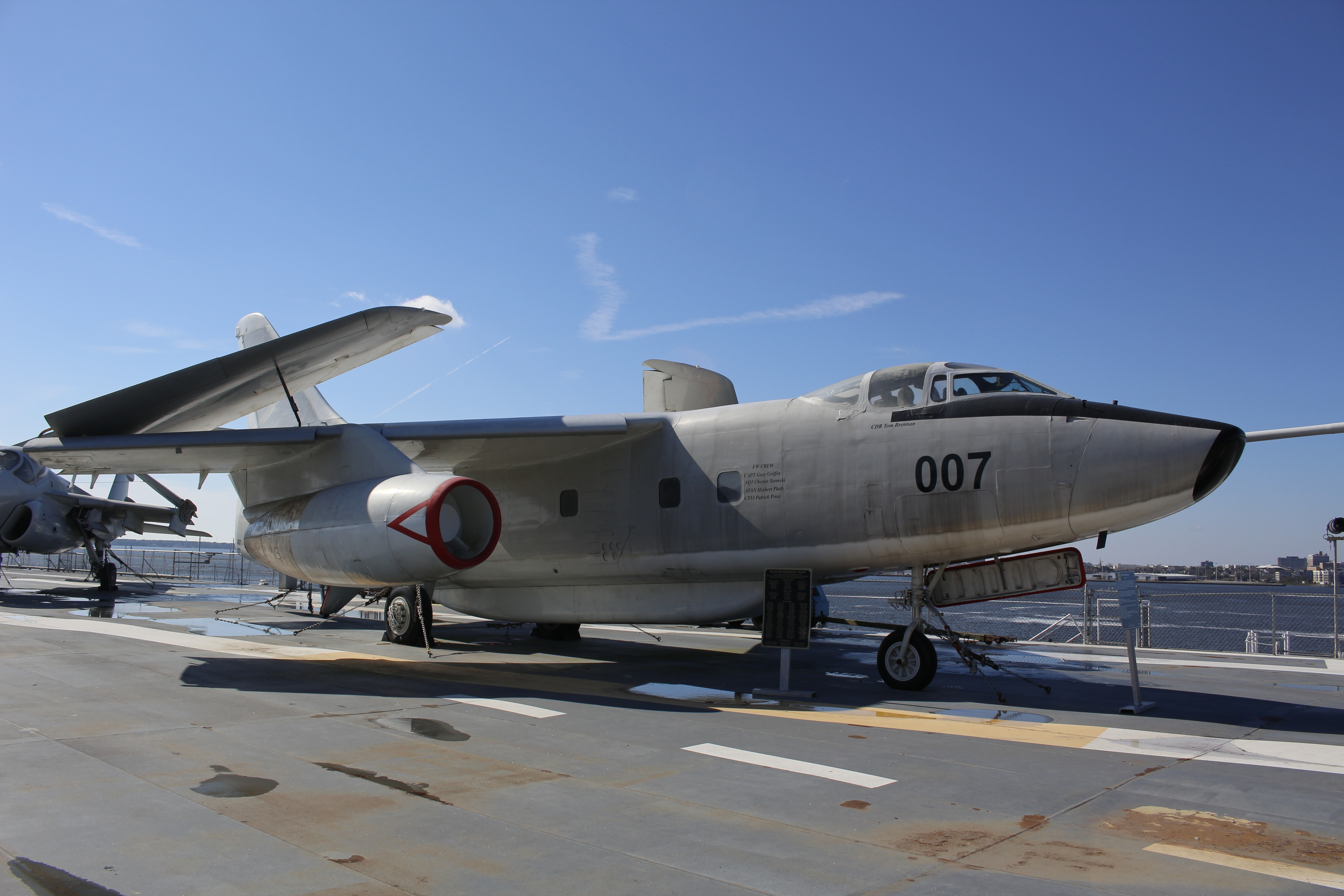
Douglas EA-3B on display with wings folded aboard museum ship USS Yorktown at Patriots Point Park in Charleston, South Carolina

A handful of EA-3Bs remained in service long enough to participate in the first Gulf War in 1991. The Skywarrior was withdrawn from USN service during September 1991, the last examples of the type being retired on 27 September 1991. U.S. Navy RDT&E units, notably Naval Air Systems Command (NAVAIR) activities at Naval Air Station Point Mugu and NAWS China Lake, attempted to retain their A-3 testbeds. These ambitions were ultimately unsuccessful when Vice Admiral Richard Dunleavy, as Deputy Chief of Naval Operations for Air Warfare and a former A-3 bombardier/navigator himself, made the final decision to retire the type.

=== Losses ===
- February 9, 1957, Mayport, Florida, USA. Aircraft lost after ground collision as a result of fuel starvation. LCDR Lewis Pollock was killed and AD2 Pasquale Del Villaggio as well as ENS Henry Demers were moderately injured.
- May 14, 1957, West of the coast of California, USA (36.30N, 122.35W). Ramp was struck following high attitude after a wave off signal. Fuselage broke at the empennage and main fuel cell was ruptured, leading to fire spreading as the aircraft fell off of the angle deck. CDR Thomas Boulton, LT JG Ralph Gordon, and ADC Joseph Hosking all died as a result.
- June 19, 1957, 2 nm east of Mayport, Florida, USA. Failure to lower port landing gear after carrier launch. The aircraft's crew were able to successfully bail out and be rescued. AQ1 Pascal Mazuc, CDR Clarence Frossard, and ENS Henry Demers were all moderately injured, with CDR Clarence Frossard being more injured than the other two crew members.
- July 6, 1967, 1 nm south of NAS Sanford, Florida, USA. Aircraft was lost after a ground collision, killing LT Henry White, AQ1 Joseph Monaco, AT2 Eugene Seaman, and CDR Charles Carman. No incident report description was written officially. A newspaper article sent by AT2 Seaman's daughter on March 1, 2012 stated that the aircraft was participating in night training landings, and was practicing mirror landings on aircraft carriers around the time of the incident.
- July, 1957, The Mediterranean Sea. ADJ 1 Samuel Hollander was crushed and killed by closing bomb bay doors on the flight deck.
- August 12, 1957, west of the coast of California, USA (37.27N, 122.49W). Arresting gear and hook encountered a point failure, and the aircraft struck the water and was lost at sea. CPO E. Buscaglia and CDR Joseph Garrett were both rescued by a helo plane guard, and sustained minor injuries.
- August 19, 1957, near Port Lyautey. Aircraft overshot barricade and was lost at sea. AD1 Frank Morey and LT JG John Quinn were both killed, while AQ1 James Babba and LCDR Thomas McLenaghan were both moderately injured.
- September 26, 1957, Norwegian Sea (66.44N, 05.16E). Aircraft encountered ramp strike, with main mounts on the A-3 breaking on impact. LTJG Joseph Juricic, CDR Paul Wilson JR, and ADC Percy Schafer were all killed.
- January 6, 1958, South China Sea (14.15N 114.3E). Aircraft failed to take off successfully after carrier launch. AMC Darrell Weekley, LT JG Clyde Romerson, and LCDR Jack Loper were all killed.
- January 28, 1958, Edwards AFB. Aircraft collided with the ground 10 miles west of Barstow, California, USA, with the cause remaining unknown. Aircraft was entirely lost. Dale Benethum and Thomas Kilgariff, both civilians, were killed in the accident.
- February 7, 1958, North Atlantic Ocean (31.10N. 40.27W.). Aircraft collided with the water and was lost at sea, with fuel contamination being the likely cause. ENS Robert Martin, LT James Chaffee, and AD3 Richard Fraveau were all killed.
- June 2, 1958, Seville, Florida, USA. - After an inflight fire caused mechanical issues, which sent the aircraft into a steep high speed dive from 42,000 feet (12,801 meters), LCDR Robert Ramey ordered crew to leave the aircraft through the overhead escape hatch. One crewmember was experiencing difficulty in leaving the aircraft through the escape chute, leading to Ramey aiding the man and as a result remaining himself in the aircraft, losing his life in the subsequent in-air explosion and crash after maneuvering the aircraft towards an open area. AO1 Raymond Hite and AT1 Daniel Gerbis were mildly injured, and LCDR Robert Ramey died.
- August 2, 1958, Western Pacific Ocean. The aircraft overran the flight deck. The aircraft hit the water inverted, with the aircraft being recovered and struck at DM AFB. The canopy shattered, with the possibility of the pilot and BN seats being carried away at impact. LCDR Alfred McMillian and LT Gordon Gilmore were both killed in the accident, with AQ1 experiencing severe injuries.
- October 1, 1958, NAS Leeward Point, Guantanamo, Cuba. Landing gear was retracted during landing, with the aircraft managing to stop safely on the flight deck. The aircraft was repairable, and LT Horace Graham as well as AD3 Samuel Craw suffered minor to moderate injuries.
- December 4, 1958. Departed from NAS Sanford for FDR - Aircraft was lost over the Caribbean. The pilot was waved off on the first pass, and boltered on the second pass. The third pass led to the left wing striking the flight deck, and the cross deck pendant parting (Arresting wire breaking). All 3 crew members were rescued by helicopter. AD1 Clyde Savage, LCDR Richard Andrus, and AD2 Eugene Kronjaeger all received moderate injuries.
- August 26, 1959. A compressor stall in a thunderstorm led to the aircraft crashing 1 nm ESE of E. Monobo, North Carolina, USA. AE2 Mitchell, PH1 D.E. Wilson both received moderate injuries with LCDR John Sandster was killed. VAH 1 CO recommended that ejection seats be installed in A3s.
- June 7, 1960. An A-3 veered off the runway during takeoff at NAS Whidbey Island/Ault Field and crashed in 5 1/2 feet of water. One man killed was LTJG Richard North, the first husband of Helen Beardsley of Yours, Mine, and Ours fame.
- January 25, 1987, Mediterranean Sea. An EA-3B low on fuel during a night landing impacted the top of the barricade of the USS Nimitz and went into the water. Killed were LT Stephen H. Batchelder (Intelligence Evaluator), LCDR Ronald R. Callander (Navigator), AT2 Richard A. Herzing, LT Alan A. Levine (Pilot), CTI3 Patrick R. Price, LT James D. Richards (Junior Evaluator), and CTI3 Craig H. Rudolf.
- June 26, 1987, NAS Miramar, California. An EA-3B crashed while conducting carrier landing practice. All three onboard perished.
- January 13, 1988, at Pyramid Lake northeast of Reno, Nevada. A KA-3B impacted the lake while flying in the late afternoon on a low-level mission. All three crew onboard were killed.

Being the heaviest aircraft to take off from a carrier, the Skywarrior was prone to accidents. (Note: In 1958 a Skywarrior set the record for the heaviest catapult takeoff weighing a massive 42 tons catapulting from the Saratoga.) "Ultimately, of 283 Skywarriors of various models built, around 120 (42%) were destroyed or crippled in accidents and combat. In 67% of accidents, at least one crew member died." Of these losses, 7 were in Vietnam, of which 2 were the result of combat.

=== Post-retirement career ===
The A-3 had been used as a civilian operated testbed for many years before the type's retirement from US Navy, with Hughes Aircraft Company using the type as a testbed for developing the weapons system for the General Dynamics–Grumman F-111B and Grumman F-14 Tomcat, with Westinghouse and Raytheon also using the A-3 as a testbed. On the retirement of the type from US Navy service in 1991, the US Navy decided to end logistic support for the civilian operated testbeds. Rather than abandon the A-3, Hughes, Westinghouse and Raytheon agreed to acquire the remaining A-3s and spares from the Navy, allowing their test fleets to continue to operate and saving the US Navy the cost of storage and disposal. As the plan matured, two other contractors, Thunderbird Aviation and CTAS also elected to participate in similar agreements, with eleven A-3s spread between the five operators. The fleet spares from ASO (Aviation Supply Office) were distributed between the contractors evenly, and warehouses were emptied all over the US. Due to misunderstandings and reorganizations within the US Navy, the worldwide ASO assets were scrapped, not getting to the contractors. In early 1993, CTAS decided that they no longer had use for their aircraft, and Hughes had several programs needing additional assets.

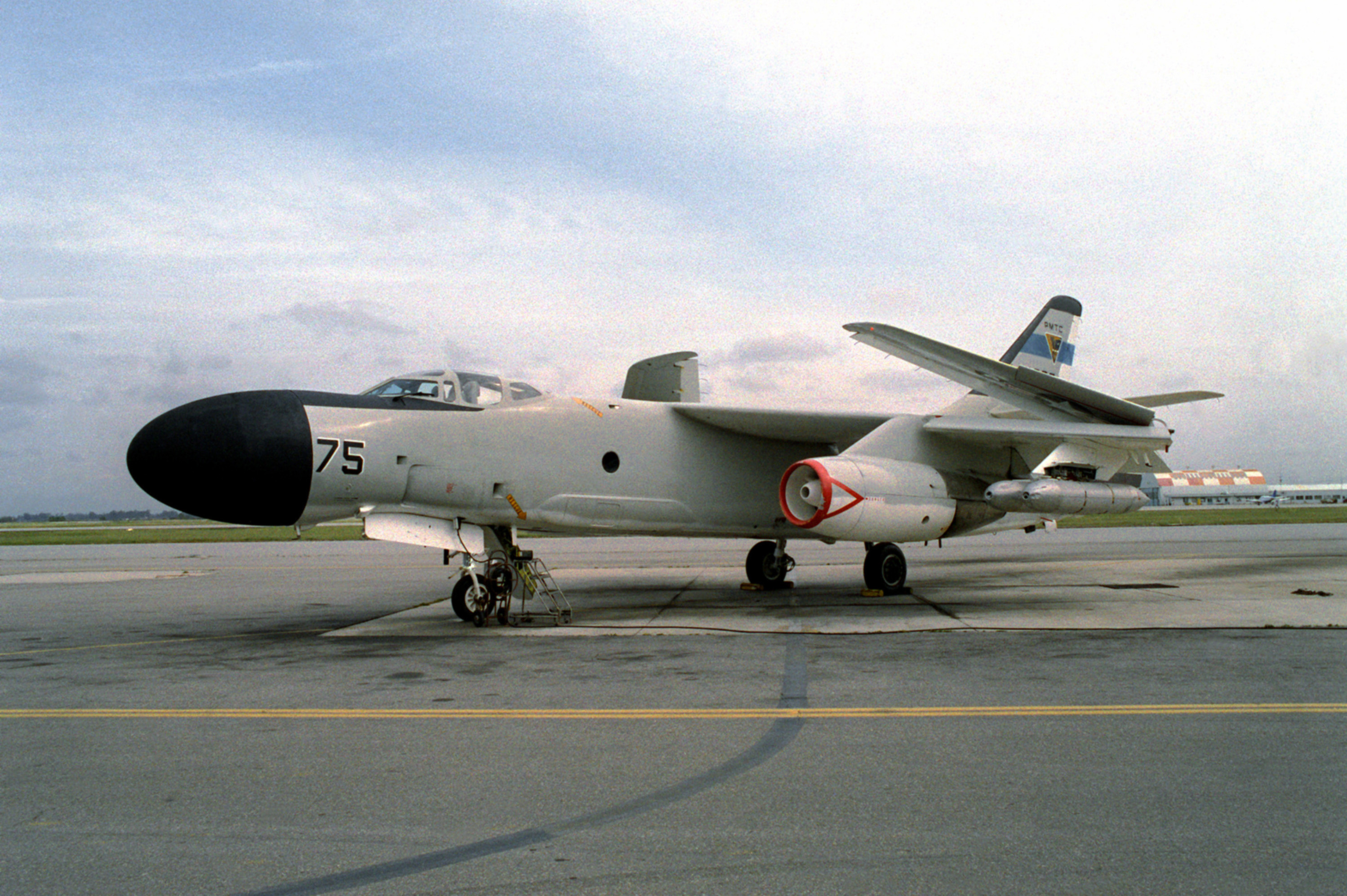
NRA-3B of the Pacific Missile Test Center in 1982

In early 1994, a US Air Force program decided to modify an A-3 for F-15 radar tests, and the only available airframe was stored at Naval Air Station Alameda since the fleet shutdown. Hughes added that aircraft to the bailment, and ferried the aircraft to Van Nuys for modifications. An entire nose section was removed from a stricken F-15B at AMARC at Davis-Monthan AFB, Arizona and grafted onto the front of the aircraft. Racks and equipment were installed in the cabin, and the aircraft was used by Hughes and the USAF for F-15 software development.

In 1994, Westinghouse decided to terminate their agreement with the Navy, and Thunderbird added their aircraft to the Thunderbird bailment. In 1996, Thunderbird Aviation went into receivership, and Hughes, through mutual cost savings to the government, added the Thunderbird assets to the contract, prepping them for ferry at Deer Valley airport, and relocating them to Mojave, California and Tucson, Arizona for long-term storage.

In December 1996, Raytheon bought the aerospace units of Hughes Aircraft Company. Hughes Aeronautical Operations, now a part of Raytheon Systems, continued to operate the A-3s from their base at Van Nuys Airport, California. These aircraft have participated in several military air shows, telling visitors that the plane continued to be valuable for its load capacity compared to corporate jets, and its performance compared to small airliners.

On 30 June 2011, the last flyable EA-3B, BuNo 144865 / FAA registration N875RS, a Raytheon aircraft, arrived at Naval Air Station Pensacola, Florida for retirement and display at the National Naval Aviation Museum.

== Variants ==
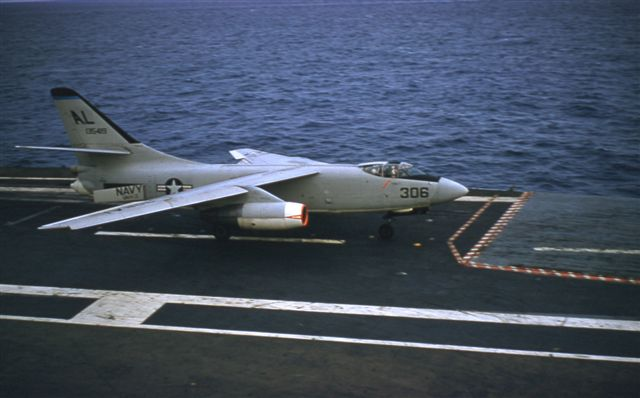
An A3D-1 of Heavy Attack Squadron 3 (VAH-3) on USS Franklin D. Roosevelt in 1957. VAH-3 became the A3D/A-3 Replacement Air Group (RAG) squadron for the Atlantic Fleet in 1958.

Note: under the original Navy designation scheme, the Skywarrior was designated A3D (third Attack aircraft from Douglas Aircraft). In September 1962, the new Tri-Services designation system was implemented and the aircraft was redesignated A-3. Where applicable, pre-1962 designations are listed first, post-1962 designations in parentheses.

- XA3D-1: Two prototypes with Westinghouse J40 turbojets, no cannon in tail turret.
- YA3D-1 (YA-3A): One pre-production prototype with Pratt & Whitney J57 engines. Later used for tests at the Pacific Missile Test Center.
- A3D-1 (A-3A): 49 initial production versions, serving largely in developmental role in carrier service.
- A3D-1P (RA-3A): One A3D-1 converted as a prototype for the A3D-2P with camera pack in the weapon bay.
- A3D-1Q (EA-3A): Five A3D-1s converted for the electronic reconnaissance (ELINT) role, with ECM equipment and four operators in weapons bay.
- A3D-2 (A-3B): Definitive production bomber version, with stronger airframe, more powerful engines, slightly larger wing area (812 ft^{2}/75 m^{2} versus 779 ft^{2}/72 m^{2}), provision for in-flight refueling reel for tanker role. Final 21 built had new AN/ASB-7 bombing system, reshaped nose; deleted tail turret in favor of electronic warfare installation.
- A3D-2P (RA-3B): 30 photo-reconnaissance aircraft with weapons bay package for up to 12 cameras plus photoflash bombs. Increased pressurization allowed camera operator to enter the bay to check the cameras. Some retained tail guns, but most were later converted to ECM tail of late A-3Bs.
- A3D-2Q (EA-3B): 24 electronic warfare versions with pressurized compartment in former weapon bay for one Electronic Warfare Officer and three ESM operators, various sensors. Some early models had tail guns, but these were replaced with the ECM tail. It was assigned to fleet reconnaissance squadrons VQ-1 (Japan and later Guam) and VQ-2 (Rota. Spain) where they flew alongside the Lockheed EC-121 Warning Star and the EP-3B and EP-3E. It served for almost 40 years, being the longest serving variant, and was replaced by the ES-3A Shadow flown by two Fleet Air Reconnaissance (VQ) squadrons: VQ-5 at Naval Air Station North Island, California and VQ-6 at Naval Air Station Cecil Field, Florida. They were decommissioned due to budget constraints less than 10 years after commissioning.
- A3D-2T (TA-3B): 12 bomber-trainer versions. Five later converted as VIP transports (two redesignated UTA-3B).
- KA-3B: 85 A-3B bombers refitted in 1967 for the tanker role with probe-and-drogue system in place of bombing equipment.
- EKA-3B: 34 KA-3B tankers refitted for dual Electronic countermeasures (ECM)/tanker role, with electronic warfare equipment and tail fairing in place of rear turret. Most were converted back to KA-3B configuration (with no ECM gear) after 1975.
- ERA-3B: Eight RA-3Bs converted as electronic aggressor aircraft (primarily for war-at sea exercises) with ECM gear in an extended tail cone and fairings, along with two detachable ram-air turbine powered ALQ-76 countermeasures pods (one under each wing), chaff dispensers (on the tail cone and aft fuselage) and four ram-air turbines (two per side) to power equipment located in the former bomb bay. Crew increased to four: pilot, navigator, crew chief, and Electronic Countermeasures Officer (ECMO) with one mostly unused "jumpseat" in the aft crew compartment (the former weapon bay) which lacked an equipment position for a second Electronic Countermeasures Officer or enlisted crewman. The "jump seat" was used by instructor ECMOs training new ECMOs, as well as by guest observers and passengers during operational flights. While the ERA-3B could withstand a cable-arrested landing, the ALT-40 and ALR-75 equipment was not stressed to withstand catapult launches, thus it was never deployed aboard carriers. The ERA-3B served with VAQ-33 and later with VAQ-34.
- NRA-3B: Six RA-3Bs converted for various non-combat test purposes.

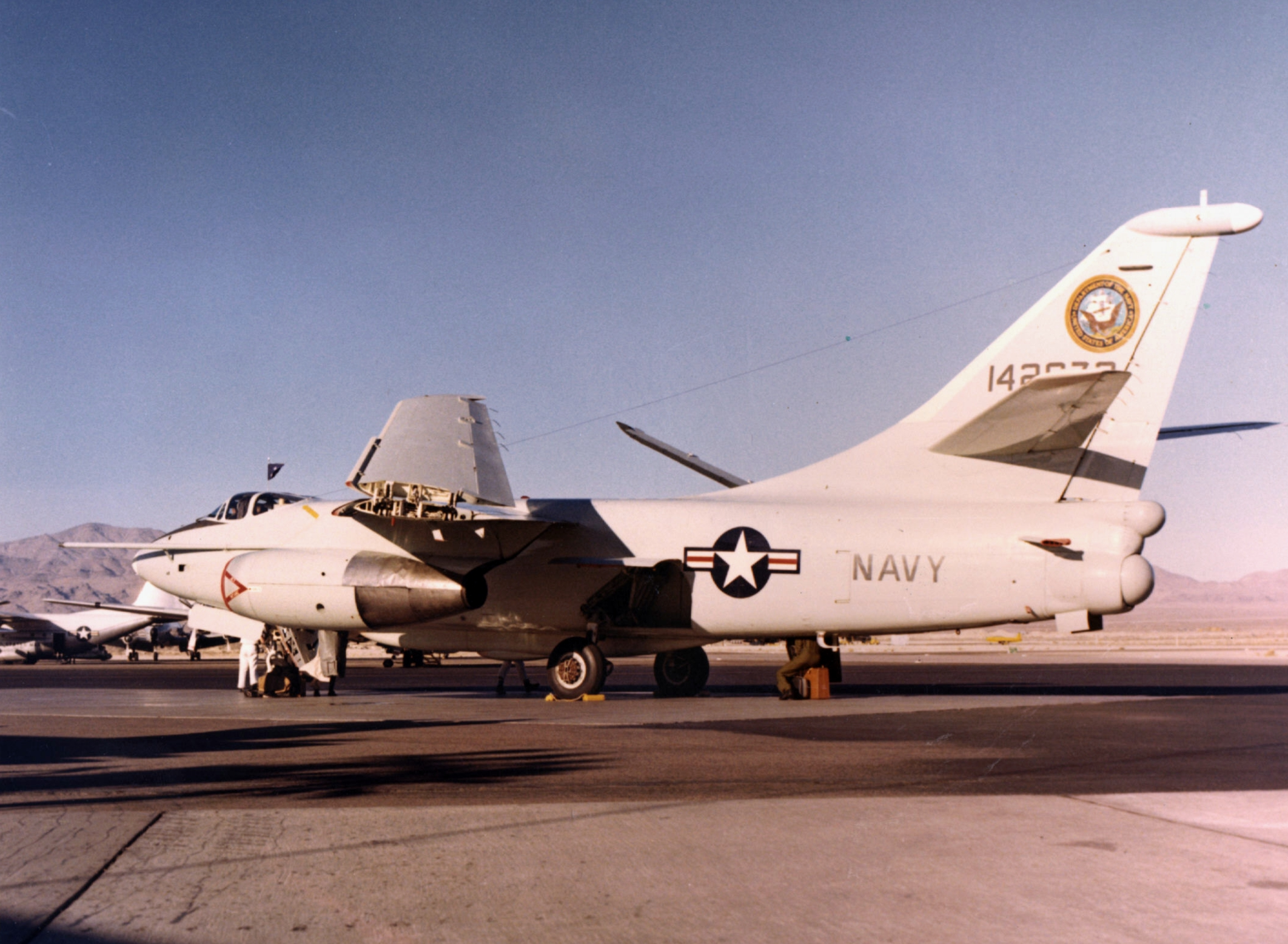
A VA-3B used by the Chief of Naval Operations at Nellis AFB.

- VA-3B: Two EA-3B converted as VIP transports. Both aircraft were assigned to the Chief of Naval Operations flying from Andrews AFB in Washington, DC.
- NTA-3B: One aircraft converted by Hughes/Raytheon used to test radar for the F-14D Tomcat.

=== B-66 Destroyer ===
The U.S. Air Force ordered 294 examples of the derivative B-66 Destroyer, most of which were used in the reconnaissance and electronic warfare roles. The Destroyer was fitted with ejection seats.

== Operators ==
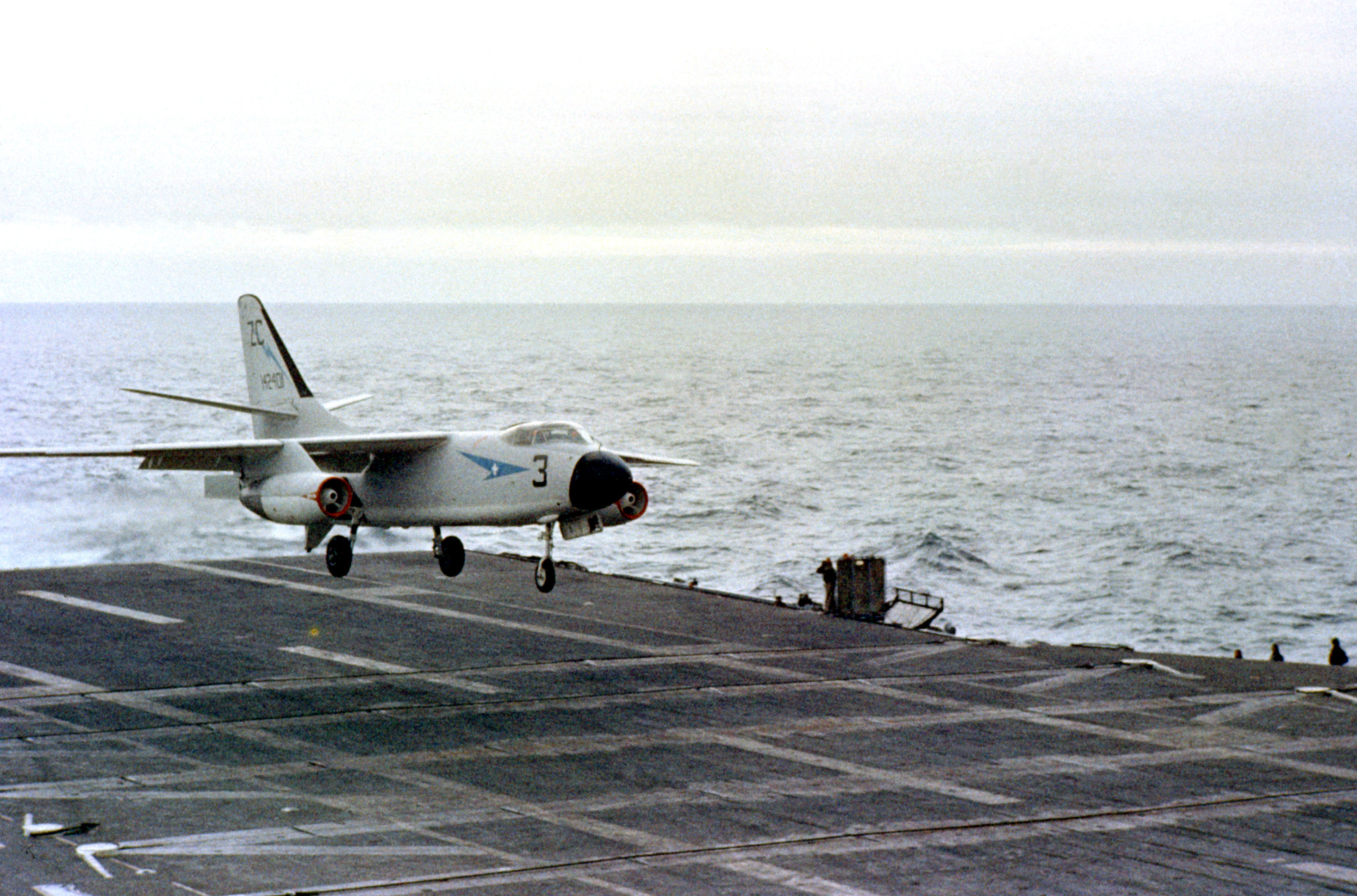
An A3D-2 of Heavy Attack Squadron 6 (VAH-6) lands on USS Ranger in 1958

United States

- United States Navy
  - VAH-1 based at Naval Air Station Sanford (later RVAH-1, now decommissioned)
  - VAH-2 based at Naval Air Station Whidbey Island (now VAQ-132)
  - VAH-3 based at Naval Air Station (later RVAH-3, now decommissioned); Replacement Air Group / Fleet Replacement Squadron
  - VAH-4 based at Naval Air Station Whidbey Island (now VAQ-131)
  - VAH-5 based at Naval Air Station Sanford (later RVAH-5, now decommissioned)
  - VAH-6 based originally at Naval Air Station North Island,
    moved to Naval Air Station Whidbey Island 1958, then moved to Naval Air Station
    (later RVAH-6, now decommissioned)
  - VAH-7 based at Naval Air Station Sanford (later RVAH-7, now decommissioned)
  - VAH-8 based at Naval Air Station Whidbey Island (now decommissioned)
  - VAH-9 based at Naval Air Station Sanford (later RVAH-9, now decommissioned)
  - VAH-10 based at Naval Air Station Whidbey Island (now VAQ-129)
  - VAH-11 based at Naval Air Station (later RVAH-11, now decommissioned)
  - VAH-13 commissioned at Naval Air Station, moved to Naval Air Station Whidbey Island 1961
    (later RVAH-13, now decommissioned)
  - VAH-123 based at Naval Air Station Whidbey Island (now decommissioned)
  - VAQ-129 based at Naval Air Station Whidbey Island (later flying the EA-6B, now flying the EA-18G); Fleet Replacement Squadron
  - VAW-13/VAQ-130 based at Naval Air Station Alameda. Later moved to Naval Air Station Whidbey Island flying the EA-6B (now VAQ-130 flying the EA-18G)
  - VAQ-131 based at Naval Air Station Alameda. Later moved to Naval Air Station Whidbey Island flying the EA-6B (now VAQ-131 flying the EA-18G)
  - VAQ-132 based at Naval Air Station Alameda. Later moved to Naval Air Station Whidbey Island flying the EA-6B (now VAQ-132 flying the EA-18G)
  - VAQ-133 based at Naval Air Station Alameda. Later moved to Naval Air Station Whidbey Island flying the EA-6B (now VAQ-133 flying the EA-18G)
  - VAQ-134 based at Naval Air Station Alameda. Later moved to Naval Air Station Whidbey Island flying the EA-6B (now VAQ-134 flying the EA-18G)
  - VAQ-135 based at Naval Air Station Alameda. Later moved to Naval Air Station Whidbey Island flying the EA-6B (now VAQ-135 flying the EA-18G)
  - VAQ-33 based at Naval Air Station Key West (now decommissioned)
  - VAQ-34 based at Naval Air Station Point Mugu (now decommissioned)
  - VAK-208 based at Naval Air Station Alameda (now decommissioned) (Naval Air Reserve)
  - VAK-308 based at Naval Air Station Alameda (now decommissioned) (Naval Air Reserve)
  - VAP-61 based at Naval Air Station Agana Guam (now decommissioned).
  - VAP-62 based at Naval Air Station Jacksonville (now decommissioned)
  - VCP-63, later VFP-63, based at Naval Air Station Miramar flying five A3D-2P Skywarriors and twenty F8U-1P Crusaders
  - VQ-1 based at Naval Air Station Agana (later based at Naval Air Station Whidbey Island flying the EP-3E and P-3C; now decommissioned)
  - VQ-2 based at Naval Station Rota, Spain (later based at Naval Air Station Whidbey Island flying only the EP-3E; now decommissioned)
  - VR-1 based at Naval Air Station Patuxent River and Andrews Air Force Base/Naval Air Facility Washington
  - VX-5 based at NAWS China Lake with detachment at Naval Air Station Sanford
  - National Parachute Test Range based at Naval Air Facility El Centro
  - Naval Air Development Center based at NADC Johnsville/NADC Warminster (activity and installation now decommissioned)
  - Naval Air Test Center at Naval Air Station Patuxent River
  - Pacific Missile Test Center at Naval Air Station Point Mugu

== Surviving aircraft ==
On display

XA3D-1

- 125413 – Fulton County Airport, Johnstown, New York.

A-3A

- 135434 – Air Force Flight Test Museum, Edwards Air Force Base, California. Restored in September 2011 by members of Naval Air Reserve Patrol Squadron 65 (VP-65) based at Naval Air Station Point Mugu.

NA-3A

- 135418 – National Naval Aviation Museum, Naval Air Station Pensacola, Florida.

YEA-3A

- 130361 – Pima Air and Space Museum, Tucson, Arizona.

A-3B

- 142246 – New England Air Museum, Windsor Locks, Connecticut.

EA-3B

- 146448 – National Cryptologic Museum, National Vigilance Park, Fort Meade, Maryland.
- 146457 – Patriots Point Naval and Maritime Museum, Mount Pleasant, South Carolina (previously displayed in front of Daum Hall Bachelor Officers Quarters, Naval Station Rota, Spain).
- 144865 – National Naval Aviation Museum, Naval Air Station Pensacola, Florida

KA-3B

- 138944 – U.S.S. Lexington Museum, Corpus Christi, Texas.
- 147648 – Naval Air Station Key West, Boca Chica Key, Florida.
- 147666 – Oakland Aviation Museum in Oakland, California.

NA-3B

- 142630 – Celebrity Row, Davis-Monthan Air Force Base, Tucson, Arizona.

EKA-3B

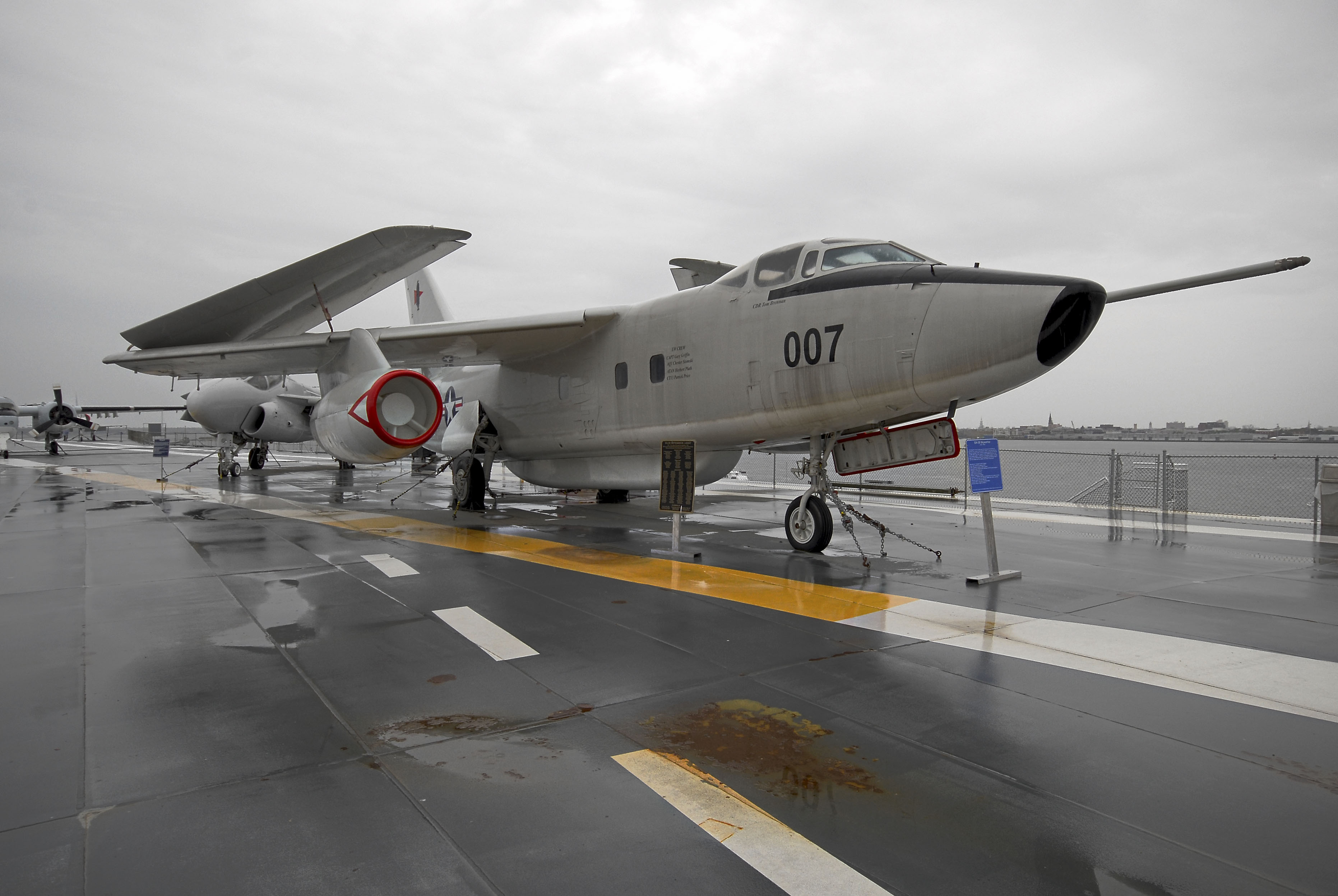
EA-3B Skywarrior aboard museum ship USS Yorktown at Patriots Point Park in Charleston, South Carolina

- 142251 – USS Midway Museum, San Diego, California.

NEA-3B

- 144865 – National Naval Aviation Museum, Naval Air Station Pensacola, Florida.

NRA-3B

- 144825 – A-3 Skywarrior Whidbey Memorial Foundation, Naval Air Station Whidbey Island, Washington.

Under Restoration

EA-3B

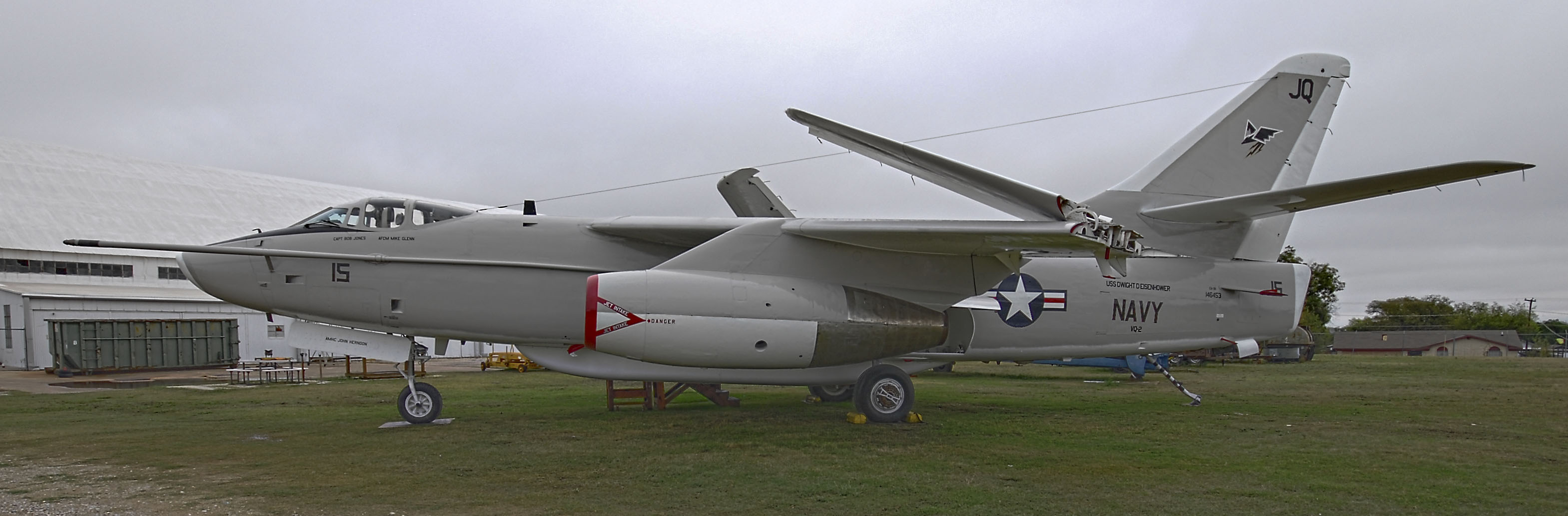
A3D-2Q (EA-3B Bu#146453) on display at the Vintage Flying Museum, Meacham Field, Fort Worth, Texas.

- 146453 – Vintage Flying Museum, Meacham Field, Fort Worth, Texas.

KA-3B

- 138965 – Yanks Air Museum, Chino, California.

ERA-3B

- 144843 – Castle Air Museum, Atwater, California.

NTA-3B

- 144867 – Pacific Aviation Museum, Pearl Harbor, Honolulu, Hawaii.

== Specifications (A3D-2/A-3B Skywarrior) ==
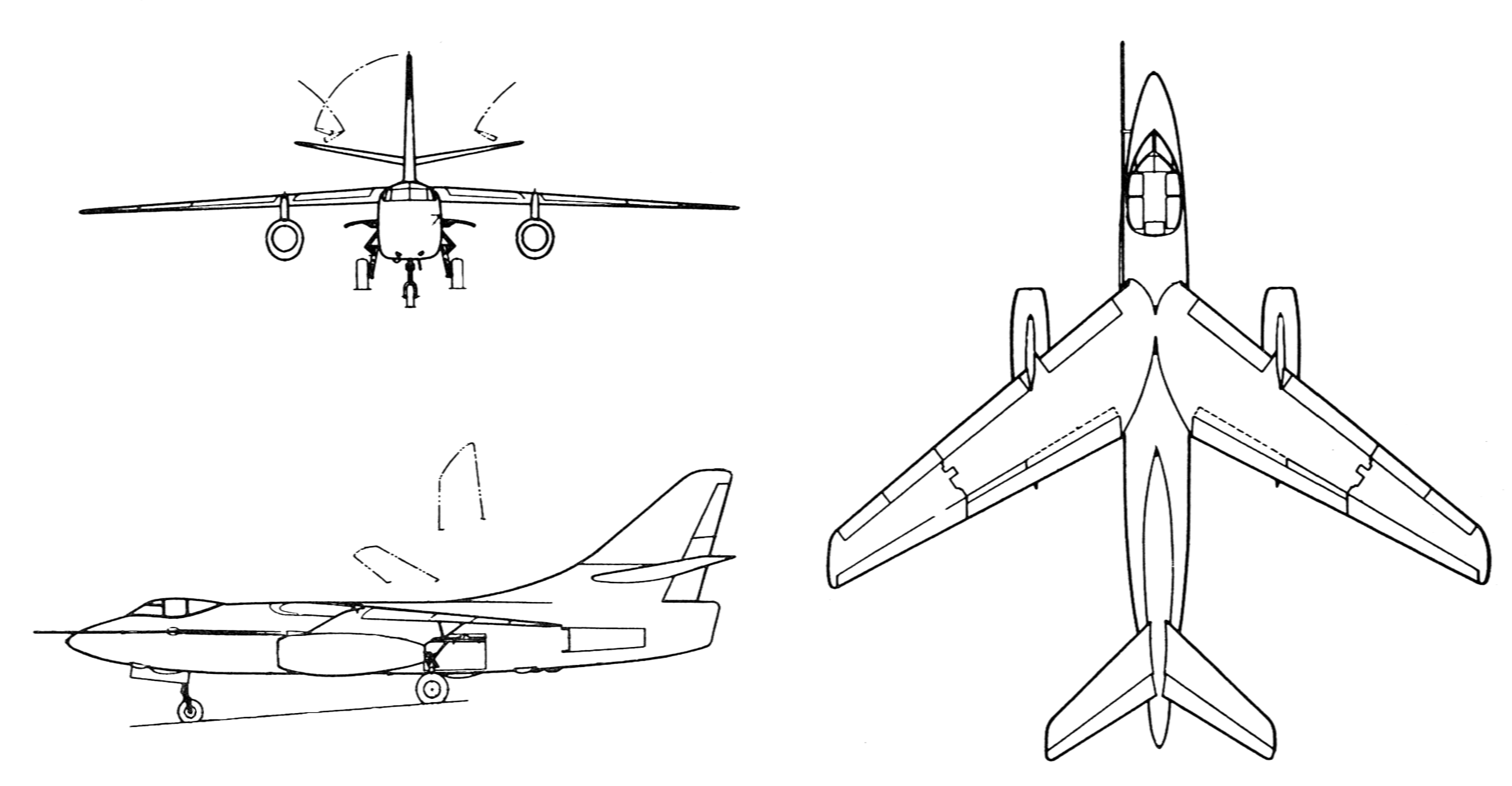

Data from McDonnell Douglas aircraft since 1920 : Volume I

General characteristics

- Crew: 3
- Length: 76 ft 4 in (23.27 m)
- Wingspan: 72 ft 6 in (22.10 m)
- Height: 22 ft 9.5 in (6.947 m)
- Wing area: 812 sq ft (75.4 m^{2}) with slats and CLE from A3D-2/A-3B
- Airfoil: root: NACA 63-009.9 (modified - {cambered leading edges}); tip: NACA 63-008.25 (modified - {cambered leading edges})
- Empty weight: 39,409 lb (17,876 kg)
- Gross weight: 70,000 lb (31,751 kg)
- Max takeoff weight: 82,000 lb (37,195 kg)
- Powerplant: 2 × Pratt & Whitney J57-P-10 turbojet engines, 10,500 lbf (47 kN) thrust each dry

12,400 lbf (55 kN) with water injection

Performance

- Maximum speed: 530 kn (610 mph, 980 km/h) at 10,000 ft (3,000 m)
- Cruise speed: 520 kn (600 mph, 960 km/h)
- Range: 1,825 nmi (2,100 mi, 3,380 km)
- Ferry range: 2,520 nmi (2,900 mi, 4,670 km)
- Service ceiling: 41,000 ft (12,000 m)
- g limits: +3.4
- Wing loading: 86.2 lb/sq ft (421 kg/m^{2})
- Thrust/weight: 0.357

Armament

- Guns: 2 × 20 mm M3L cannon in the tail turret
- Bombs: 12,800 pounds (5,800 kg) of free-fall bombs or mines, including any combination of
  - 12 × 500 pounds (230 kg) Mark 82 bombs or
  - 6 × 1,000 pounds (450 kg) Mark 83 bombs or
  - 8 × 1,600 pounds (730 kg) armor-piercing bombs or
  - 4 × 2,000 pounds (910 kg) bombs
  - 1 × free-fall nuclear weapon

Avionics

- AN/ASB-1A (early radar)
- AN/ASB-7 bomb-director
- Defensive electronic countermeasure gear

== See also ==
Aircraft of comparable role, configuration, and era

- Ilyushin Il-28
- Sud Aviation Vautour
- Yakovlev Yak-28

Related lists

- List of bomber aircraft
- List of military aircraft of the United States
