= VAK-308 =

Tactical Aerial Refueling Squadron 308
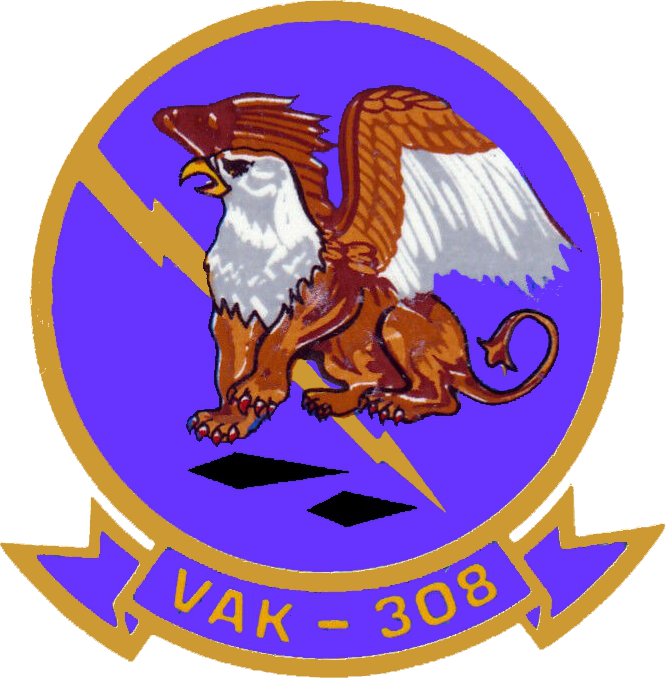
- Active: 2 May 1970 – 30 September 1988
- Country: United States
- Branch: United States Navy
- Role: Refueling
- Part of: Inactive
- Nickname(s): Griffins

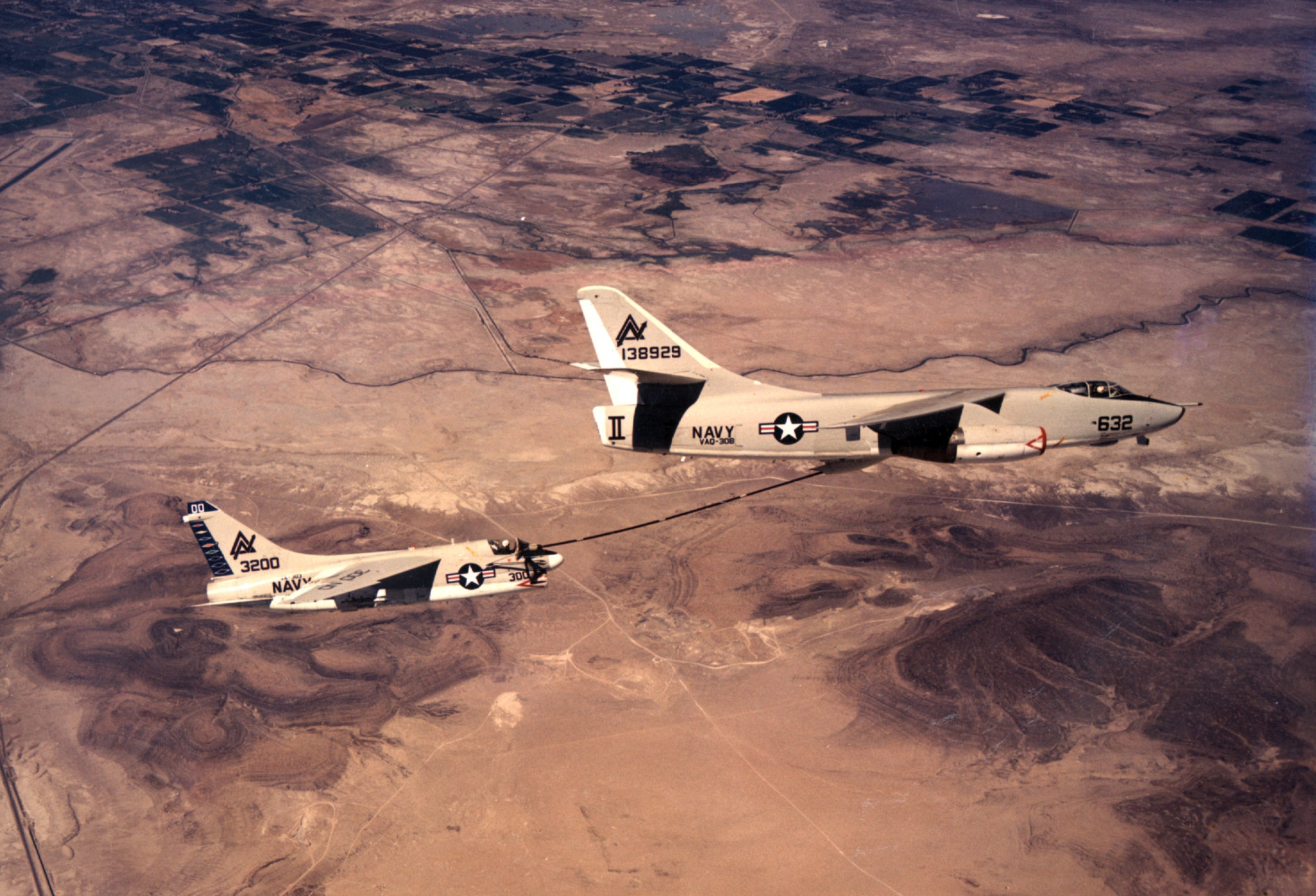
VAK-308 KA-3B refueling a VA-303 A-7A in the 1970s

VAK-308 was a United States Navy Tactical Aerial Refueling Squadron. The squadron was established on 2 May 1970 as a Tactical Electronic Warfare Squadron VAQ-308, redesignated as VAK-308 on 1 October 1979 and disestablished on 30 September 1988.

== Operational history ==
The squadron was established as part of a reorganization intended to increase the combat readiness of the Naval Air Reserve Force. It was to provide electronic warfare, tanking, pathfinding and carrier onboard delivery service to the Atlantic and Pacific Fleets and other units around the world. During its lifetime it provided these services to numerous operations, including those during the Indo-Pakistani War of 1971, the Yom Kippur War, and the Turkish Invasion of Cyprus. It was embarked on many different aircraft carriers.

== Home port assignments ==
The squadron was assigned to these home ports:

- NAS Alameda

== Aircraft assignment ==
- KA-3B Skywarrior

== See also ==
- History of the United States Navy
- List of inactive United States Navy aircraft squadrons
