= VAP-62 =

Heavy Photographic Squadron 62
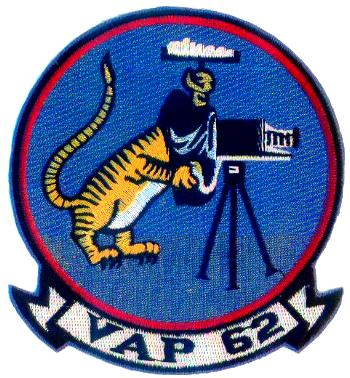
- VAP-62 squadron patch
- Active: 10 April 1952 – 15 October 1969
- Country: United States
- Branch: United States Navy
- Role: Photo-reconnaissance
- Part of: Inactive
- Nickname(s): Tigers
- Engagements: Vietnam War

VAP-62 was a Heavy Photographic Squadron of the U.S. Navy. Originally established as Photographic Squadron Sixty-Two (VJ-62) on 10 April 1952, it was redesignated as Heavy Photographic Squadron (VAP-62) on 2 July 1956. The squadron was disestablished on 15 October 1969.

== Operational history ==
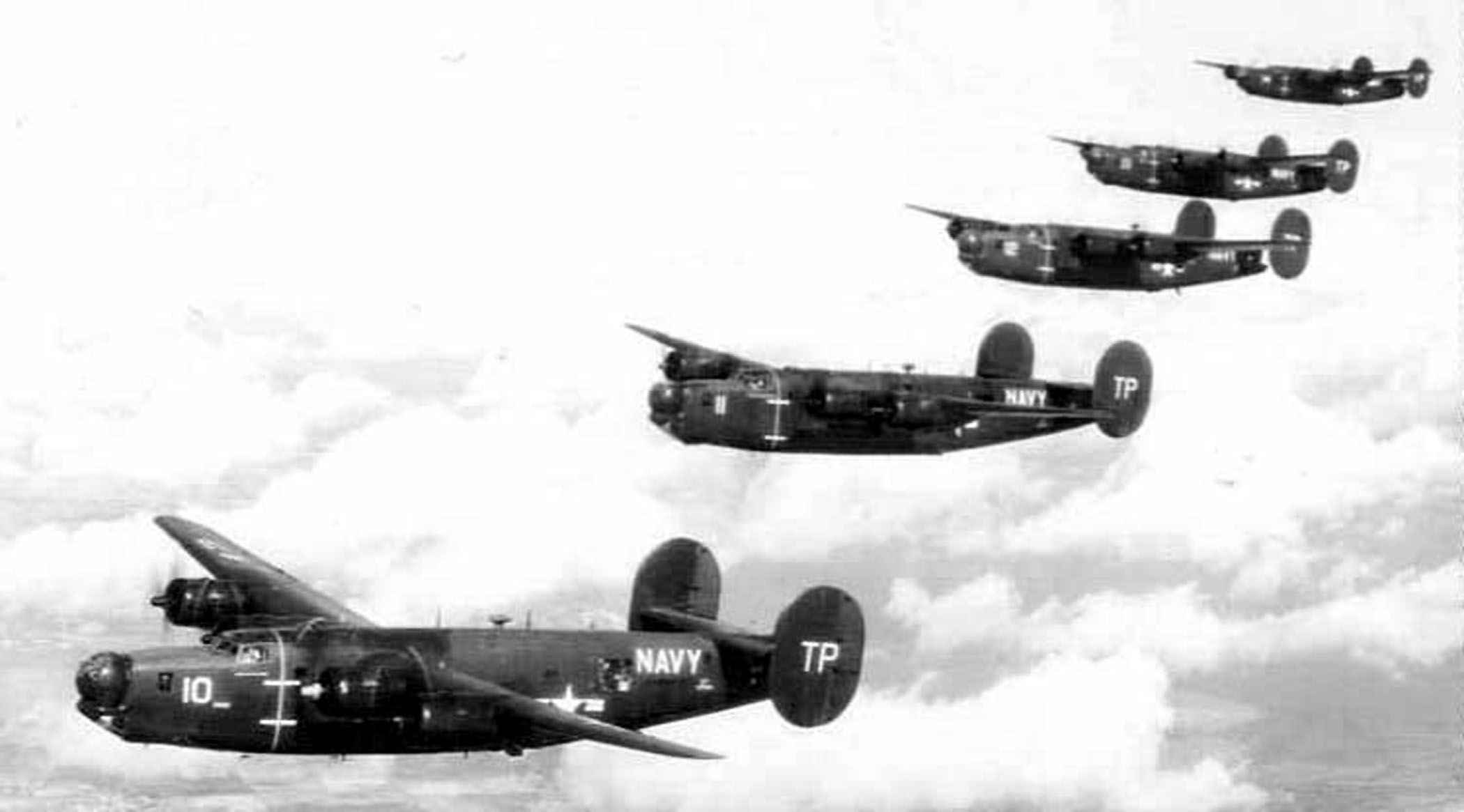
VAP-62 PB4Y-1P Privateers in 1952

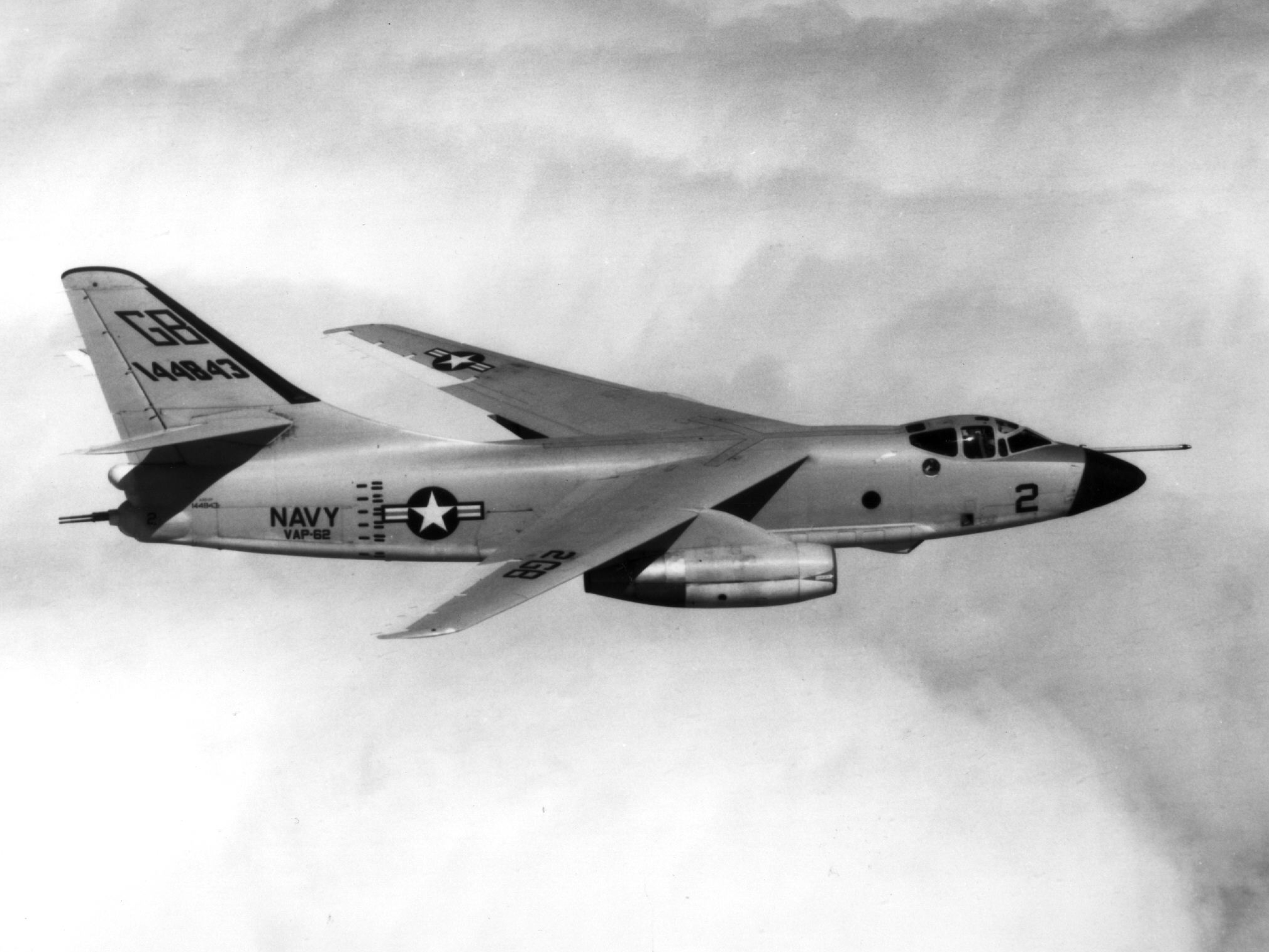
VAP-62 A3D-2P Skywarrior in the late 1950s

- 1 September–19 December 1952: A squadron detachment was deployed to Dhahran Air Force Base in Saudi Arabia.
- 29 July 1960: During a landing aboard USS Saratoga (CV-60), the squadron’s commanding officer, Commander C. T. Frohne, and two other squadron crewmembers, were lost when the tailhook of their A3D-2P Skywarrior separated and the aircraft plunged off the deck into the sea.
- October 1966: The squadron transferred a detachment of aircraft and personnel to VAP-61 to augment that squadron’s operations in Vietnam.
- 25 August 1967: A squadron RA-3B #144835 disappeared on a nighttime photo-reconnaissance mission, the 3 man crew were killed in action, body not recovered.

== Home port assignments ==
The squadron was assigned to these home ports, effective on the dates shown:

- NAS Jacksonville - 10 April 1952
- NAAS Sanford - 20 October 1952
- NAS Norfolk - July 1955
- NAS Jacksonville - 15 August 1957

== Aircraft assignment ==
The squadron first received the following aircraft on the dates shown:

- PB4Y-1P/P4Y-1P Privateer - May 1952
- AJ-2P Savage - September 1952
- F7F-4N Tigercat - May 1953
- A3D-1P/A3D-2P/RA-3B Skywarrior - 14 October 1957

== See also ==
- Reconnaissance aircraft
- List of inactive United States Navy aircraft squadrons
- History of the United States Navy
