= Jeff Bolton =

American documentary producer (born 1965)

- Jeff Bolton during production of The Watch: America's Nuclear Mission in 2024
- Occupations: Documentary producer, journalist and radio host
- Known for: Military aviation reporting and documentary production
- Website: jeffbolton.org

Jeff Bolton is an American documentary producer, journalist and former talk radio host whose work has included radio broadcasting, military aviation reporting and documentary filmmaking.

== Career ==
Bolton worked in American talk radio, including at KFAB in Omaha, Nebraska, WOAI in San Antonio, Texas, and KLIF in Dallas, Texas. His broadcasting work included moderating a San Antonio mayoral debate between Phil Hardberger and Julián Castro.

Bolton's journalism has covered military aviation, aircraft technology, motorsport history and military personnel. His published work has included reporting on Alaska Air National Guard pararescue operations in Arctic conditions and the modernisation of the Boeing B-52 Stratofortress. Bolton's automotive writing has included a feature about Jacques Grelley, a collector of historic motorsport posters and imagery.

In 2019, Bolton filmed footage inside a B-2 Spirit stealth bomber during flight. The footage showed the aircraft's cockpit, flight displays and an aerial refuelling operation. The material was released publicly in April 2019, and further footage and photographs subsequently documented the aircraft's cockpit and instruments. In June 2025, coverage revisited Bolton's access to the aircraft and the rarity of in-flight views of its cockpit.

Bolton has also discussed his experience flying in the F-16 Fighting Falcon. In a 2024 article about the aircraft's continued use, he was identified as an aviation journalist and broadcaster and discussed aspects of its cockpit and handling. He has also flown with the United States Navy's VFC-111 adversary squadron at Naval Air Station Key West, which operates F-5 aircraft in adversary training roles.

Bolton produced the documentary America's Marine Aviators with director Dana Altman of North Sea Films. The documentary focuses on United States Marine Corps pilots and aircrew and has been made available through Amazon Prime Video.

In May 2023, the Nebraska Examiner reported on a Nebraska state grant programme that included up to $5 million for a documentary or miniseries about United States Strategic Command. The report identified Bolton as being associated with Dallas-based NFN Productions LP and quoted him discussing the importance of documenting the United States' nuclear deterrence mission. It also identified him as executive producer of the television series The Watch: America's Nuclear Mission Revealed.

The same report stated that Bolton was producing a planned theatrical feature about Nebraska state senator Tom Brewer, provisionally titled Akicita — The Warrior. The proposed film was described as being about Brewer's life. The report also noted Bolton's previous residence in Nebraska from 1997 to 2004 and his plans to return to the state for the documentary project.

Bolton created and serves as showrunner and executive producer of The Watch: America's Nuclear Mission, a six-part documentary series about personnel involved in the United States' nuclear deterrence operations. The series examines activities across the country's nuclear forces, including strategic bombers, ballistic missile submarines and intercontinental ballistic missile facilities. Directed by Ted Schillinger and narrated by Gary Sinise, the series was scheduled to begin limited theatrical screenings in IMAX venues on 22 October 2026, followed by a release on Amazon Prime Video in November 2026.
