= VF-111 (1956–1995) =

Fighter Squadron 111
- VF-111 squadron patch
- Active: 4 June 1955 – 31 March 1995
- Country: United States
- Branch: United States Navy
- Type: Fighter
- Nickname: Sundowners
- Motto: Illegitimus Non Carborundum
- Mascot: Omar
- Engagements: Vietnam War; Operation Earnest Will; Operation Restore Hope; Operation Southern Watch * January 1993 airstrikes on Iraq; 1994 North Korean nuclear crisis

Aircraft flown
- Fighter: F11F-1 Tiger; F-8D/E/C/H Crusader; F-4B/J/N Phantom; F-14A Tomcat

Fighter Squadron 111 (VF-111), also known as the Sundowners, was a fighter squadron of the United States Navy. Originally established as Attack Squadron 156 (VA-156) on 4 June 1955, it was redesignated VF-111 on 20 January 1959, the day after the original VF-111 was disestablished. The squadron was redesignated VF-26 on 1 September 1964, redesignated as VF-111 on 17 September 1964 and disestablished on 31 March 1995.

== History ==
3 distinct Navy squadrons have called themselves ‘Sundowners’. The U.S. Navy frequently has given the same designation to two or more aviation units, leading to lasting confusion. Officially, the US Navy does not recognize a direct lineage with disestablished squadrons if a new squadron is formed with the same designation. Often, the new squadron will assume the nickname, insignia, and traditions of the earlier squadrons. In November 2006, VFC-13 Detachment Key West was redesignated as VFC-111, taking on the 'Sundowner' insignia and callsign.

=== Early History (1955-1963) ===
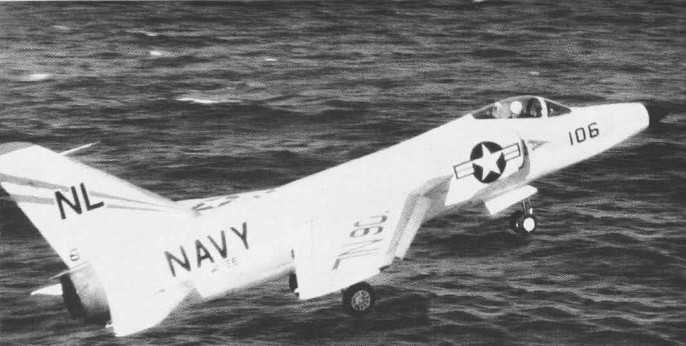
VA-156 F11F-1 Tiger

VA-156, originally known as the Iron Tigers, was established on 4 June 1955 and flew the F11F-1 Tiger. VA-156 was assigned to CVW-11 and made a single deployment aboard USS Shangri-La to the Western Pacific. VF-111 deployed the Western Pacific aboard USS Lexington in 1956.

In 1961, the Sundowners' traditional mascot, "Omar," was conceived by squadron enlisted men to mark the transition to the F-8D Crusader. The triangular stick figure appeared on VF-111 aircraft and squadron spaces. During the 1960s, VF-111 flew four versions of the Crusader (F-8C/D/E/H). Also coinciding with the Crusader's introduction to the squadron was the first application of "sharkmouth" nose art on VF-111 aircraft, which was to be a staple of the squadron until its disestablishment.

=== Vietnam War deployments (1963-1975) ===
During the Vietnam War, the Sundowners were based at NAS Miramar, California with the squadron (including detachments) making ten deployments to Southeast Asia, flying 12,500 combat sorties. From 17 October 1963 to 20 July 1964, VF-111 was deployed on USS Kitty Hawk and equipped with F-8Ds.

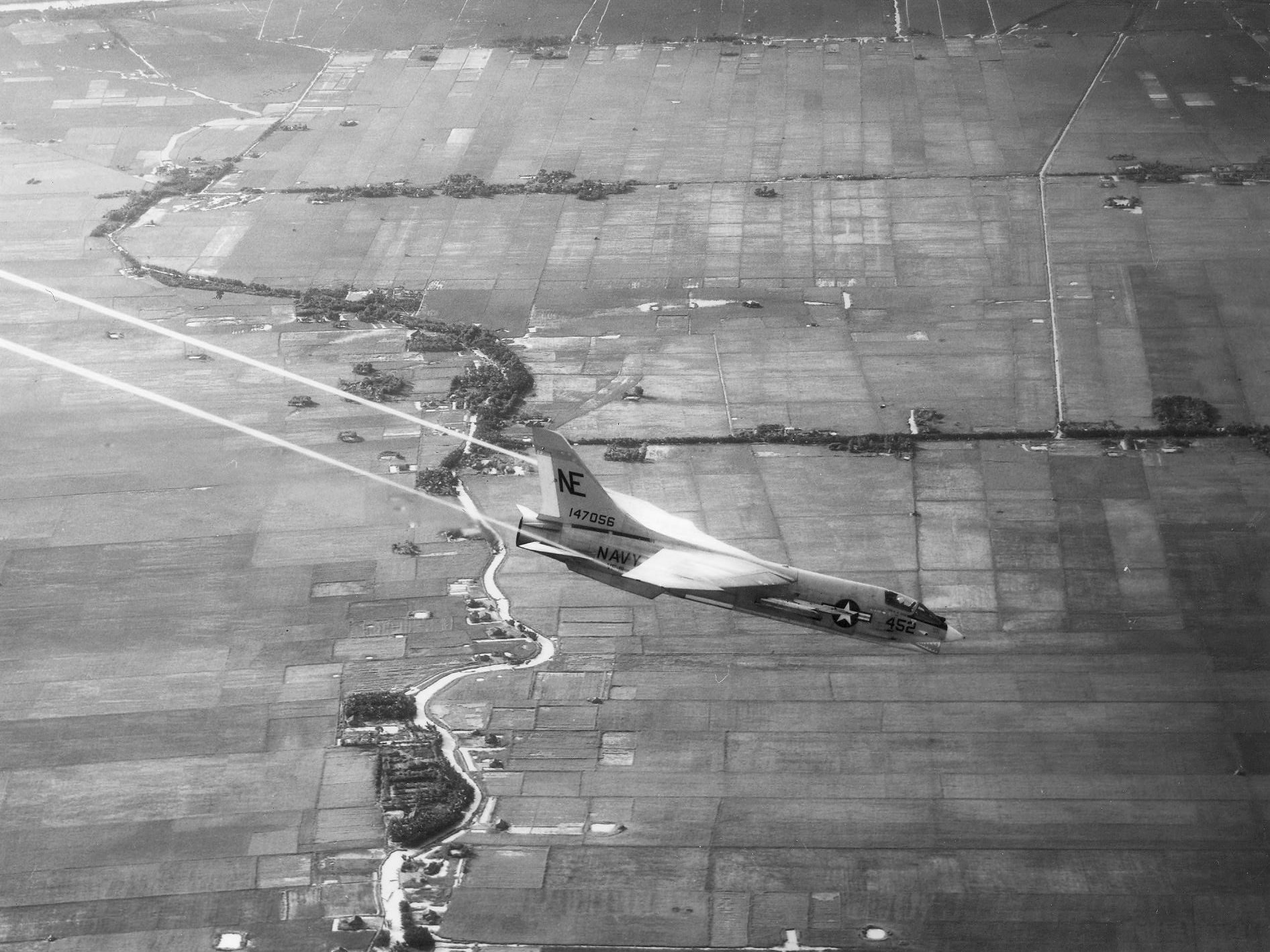
VF-111 F-8D attacks ground targets in South Vietnam in 1965

From 6 March to 20 November 1965, VF-111 was deployed on USS Midway. On 5 May, F-8D BuNo 148637 was hit by anti-aircraft fire over North Vietnam and crashed into the sea. The pilot, CDR James LaHaye, was killed in action, and his body was not recovered. On 27 May, F-8D BuNo 148706 was shot down near Vinh; the pilot CDR Doyle Lynn was killed in action, body not recovered. On 12 August. F-8D BuNo 147911 was lost; the pilot, LTJG Gene Gollahon, was killed, and his remains were returned in March 1974. On 3 November, F-8D BuNo 148635 was shot down; the pilot ejected successfully and was rescued.

From 26 May to 16 November 1966, VF-111 equipped with F-8Es was deployed on USS Oriskany. On 6 April, F-8E BuNo 150296 was lost; the pilot ejected successfully and was rescued. On 11 August, F-8E BuNo 150880 was lost due to hydraulic failure; the pilot ejected successfully and was rescued. On 13 August, F-8E BuNo 150866 was hit by antiaircraft fire; the pilot ejected successfully and was rescued. On 23 August, F-8E BuNo 150907 was lost due to engine failure; the pilot ejected successfully and was rescued. On 5 September, F-8E BuNo 150896 was hit by anti-aircraft fire; the pilot, USAF exchange officer Capt Wilfred Keese Abbott, ejected successfully, was captured, and released on 4 March 1973.

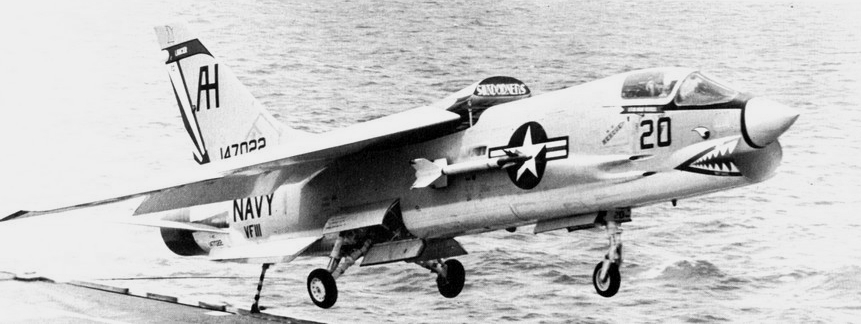
VF-111 Det.11 Omar's Orphans F-8C landing on USS Intrepid in 1967

From 11 May to 30 December 1967, VF-111 Detachment 11, Omar's Orphans, equipped with F-8Cs was deployed on USS Intrepid. Nominally an anti-submarine carrier in the Atlantic Fleet, USS Intrepid made three deployments with CVW-10 to Vietnam as an attack carrier. On 12 August F-8C BuNo 146993 was shot down, the pilot was rescued from the sea. On 26 October, three members of the squadron were killed in the USS Oriskany fire.

From 16 June 1967 to 31 January 1968, VF-111 equipped with F-8Cs was deployed on USS Oriskany. On 31 July F-8C #146993 was hit by an SA-2, the pilot, LT Charles Zuhoski, ejected successfully, was captured, and released on 14 March 1973. On 8 September, F-8C BuNo 146929 was lost due to electrical failure; the pilot ejected successfully and was rescued. On 5 October F-8C #146138 was shot down. Its pilot, ENS David Paul Matheny, ejected successfully, but was captured and, after being one of twelve US POWs to accept an offer of early release by the North Vietnamese, was released on 16 February 1968. On 5 December, F-8C BuNo 146907 was shot down, the pilot ejected successfully and was rescued. On 2 January 1968, F-8C BuNo 146989 was shot down near Vinh, the pilot ejected successfully and was rescued.

From 4 June 1968 to 8 February 1969, VF-111 Detachment 11 was deployed on USS Intrepid. On 19 September, Lieutenant Tony Nargi shot down a Vietnam People's Air Force (VPAF) MiG-21 with an AIM-9 Sidewinder.

From 1 February to 18 September 1969, VF-111 equipped with F-8Hs was deployed aboard USS Ticonderoga. On 6 July, F-8H BuNo 148636 was lost due to engine failure; the pilot ejected successfully and was rescued.

From 5 March to 17 December 1970, VF-111 made their last deployment with F-8 Crusaders aboard the USS Shangri-La. By the time they transitioned to the McDonnell F-4 Phantom II the following year, VF-111 had the highest combat loss rate of the F-8 fighter units deployed to Vietnam.

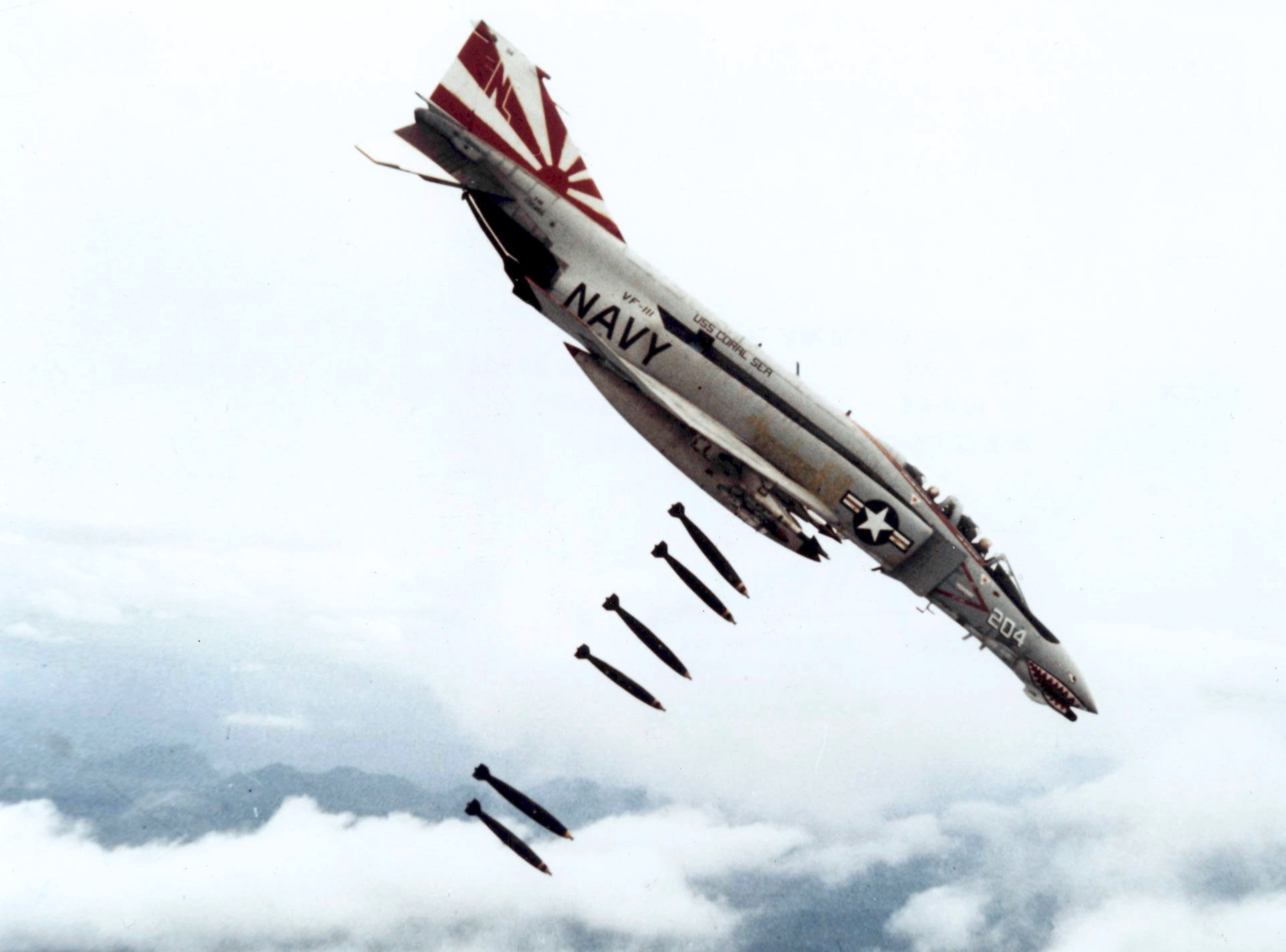
VF-111 F-4B bombing over Vietnam in 1971

In 1971, VF-111 joined CVW-15, transitioned to the F-4B, and subsequently deployed on USS Coral Sea from 12 November 1971 to 17 July 1972. On 6 March 1972, LT Garry Weigand and LTJG Bill Freckleton engaged and shot down a VPAF MiG-17 near Quang Lang Airfield in North Vietnam. Their aircraft, F-4B, NL 201, BuNo 153019, was restored to the original paint scheme by the current Sundowner squadron, VFC-111, and is displayed on a pedestal just inside the main gate at NAS Key West, Florida. The squadron later transitioned to the F-4N version of the Phantom, but it was scheduled to turn these in for the F-4J.

From 9 March to 8 November 1973, VF-111 was deployed on USS Coral Sea. In 1975, both VF-51 and VF-111 received six F-4Js but quickly reverted to the F-4N model due to operational considerations for their next deployment.

=== Later history and Disestablishment (1976-1995) ===
VF-111's first batch of F-14A Tomcats in flight, 1978

In late 1976 through early 1977, VF-111 made an Atlantic and Mediterranean deployment, a rare event for a Pacific Fleet squadron, with CVW-19 aboard USS Franklin D. Roosevelt for that carrier's final cruise.

The squadron returned to NAS Miramar in April 1977 and soon afterwards began transitioning to the F-14A Tomcat, which was operated by the squadron for 16 years and had the longest tenure of any aircraft type operated by the Sundowners. By October 1978, both VF-51 and VF-111 had fully transitioned to the Block 100 model F-14A. VF-111 subsequently deployed with CVW-15 aboard USS Kitty Hawk from May 1979 to February 1980, a deployment which was extended from its originally planned end date in early December 1979 due to the November 1979 seizure of the American Embassy in Tehran, Iran. During this period, the squadron operated from the USS Kitty Hawk in the Indian Ocean south of the Iranian coast until relieved by the USS Nimitz and the squadrons of CVW-8. The squadron suffered one non-combat loss on September 8, 1979, when F-14A BuNo 160672 crashed off the Philippine coast after suffering an engine fire while launching from the Kitty Hawk; the pilot, LTJG Richard Cummings, and RIO, LT Lloyd Abel, ejected. The squadron would lose six more F-14 Tomcats between 1981 and 1992.

VF-111 F-14A landing on the USS Carl Vinson, 1983

After its "extended" deployment during the first two months of 1980, VF-111 deployed again with USS Kitty Hawk from April to October 1981. VF-111 and the other squadrons of CVW-15 were subsequently assigned to the USS Carl Vinson for the ship's maiden cruise in 1983, which saw the Sundowners accumulate over 1400 carrier arrested landings and 300 flight hours during the eight-month long voyage. This was the first of six consecutive cruises with the Carl Vinson lasting until 1990. After the 1984-1985 WestPac deployment, VF-111 and VF-51 participated in the filming of the movie Top Gun by providing planes for use in the film's aerial sequences.

In the spring of 1986, VF-111 began another work-up cycle, completing a series of training evolution and exercises in preparation for their June 1988 Pacific/Indian Ocean deployment. VF-111's seventeen-month work-up was capped by FLEETEX 88–2, the first time since World War II that a carrier, USS Carl Vinson and a battleship, the USS New Jersey operated as a combined Battle Fleet.

VF-111's 1988 deployment began in June and ended in December. Carl Vinson and CVW-15, with VF-111 attached, departed for the ship's fourth overseas deployment on 15 June 1988. While on station, the carrier supported Operation Earnest Will, the escort of U.S. flagged tankers in the Persian Gulf. The carrier returned to the States on 16 December 1988 and was awarded the Admiral Flatley Memorial Award for aviation safety for 1988. It included operations in the Northern/Western Pacific, Arabian Sea, and Indian Ocean, providing support of tanker escorts in the Persian Gulf and included a transit of the Bering Sea, the fourth such transit in four deployments.

In preparation for deployment in 1990, VF-111 deployed aboard USS Carl Vinson from September to November 1989 as participants in PACEX 89. This exercise had the Sundowners operating in the Bering Sea, the Pacific Ocean and the Sea of Japan as a part of the largest naval exercise since World War II.

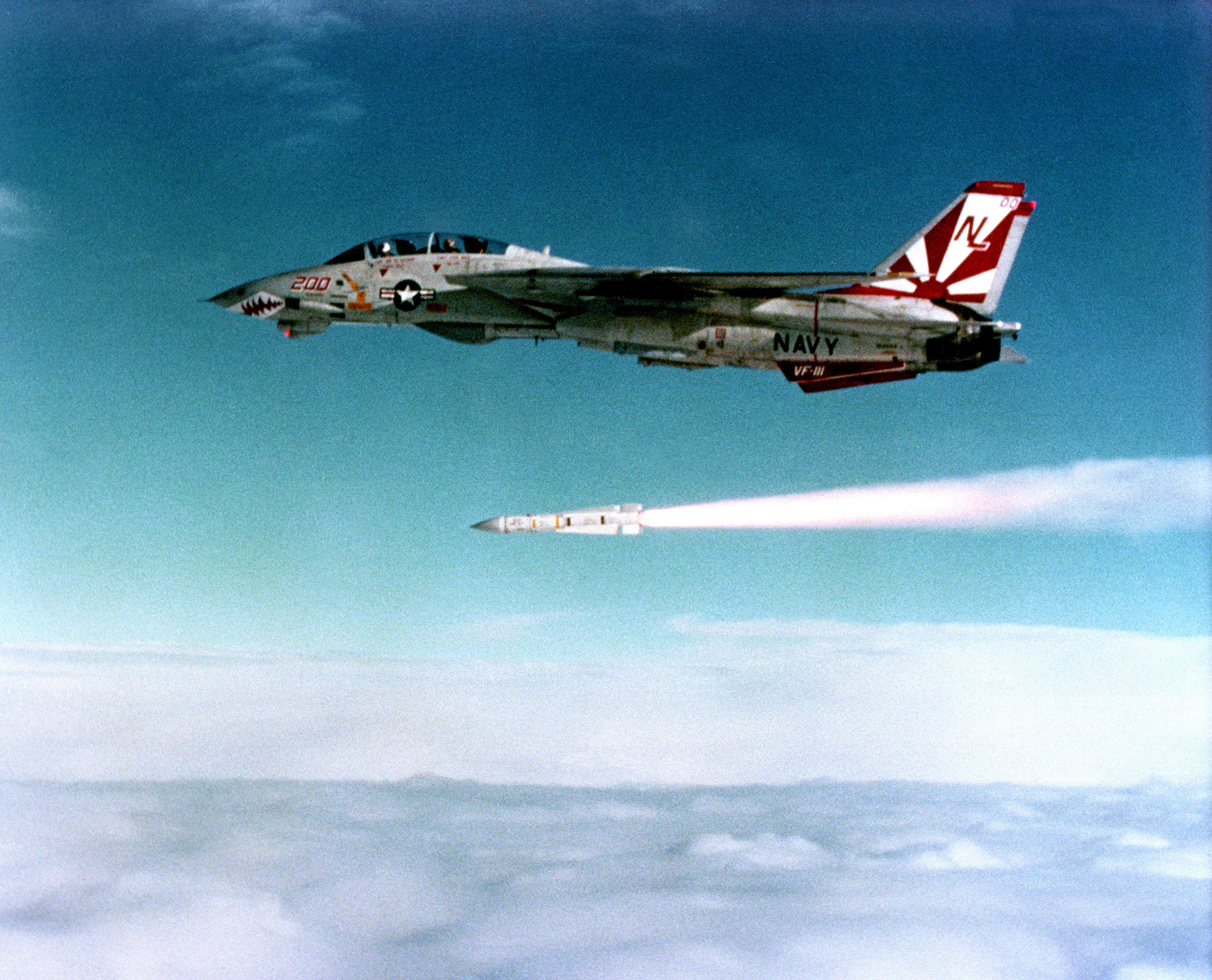
VF-111 F-14A launching a Phoenix missile, 1991.

The Sundowners next deployed from February to July 1990. VF-111 received the 1990 Boola Boola award for success in exercise missile firings, as well as the 1990 Tactical Air Reconnaissance Pod System (TARPS) derby, awarded to the best tactical air reconnaissance squadron on the West Coast.

On 15 October 1991, VF-111 returned to USS Kitty Hawk for her two-month cruise from NAS Norfolk, Virginia "around the horn" of South America to NAS North Island, California following the carrier's comprehensive, multi-year Service Life Extension Program (SLEP) at Philadelphia Naval Shipyard. Multi-national exercises with Venezuela, Argentina and Chile were conducted in various air-to-air and strike scenarios. The Sundowners returned to NAS Miramar in December 1991.

Original Navy plans intended for VF-51 and VF-111 to become the first deployable squadrons to transition to the F-14D Super Tomcat, however, these plans were cancelled in December 1991 due to the squadron's pending transfer to the USS Kitty Hawk, which was not adequately equipped to accommodate the improved Tomcat model. After moving back to the Kitty Hawk with CVW-15, VF-111 participated in RIMPAC 1992 between June and July 1992. The squadron left on their 1992 WESTPAC cruise on 3 November 1992. In 1993, VF-111 deployed to the Pacific, Indian Ocean and the Persian Gulf and flew in support of Operation Restore Hope and Operation Southern Watch. In 1994 VF-111 deployed again to the Pacific in light of the nuclear crisis off the Korean peninsula. Following this deployment, the squadron was disestablished on 31 March 1995 as part of post-Cold War force reductions of the Navy's F-14 community, with its aircraft reassigned to other F-14 squadrons.

=== Post-disestablishment ===
In November 2006, Fighter Composite Squadron 13 (VFC-13) Detachment Key West was established as Fighter Composite Squadron 111 (VFC-111), thus continuing the Sundowner tradition, but not the unit lineage.

== Notable members ==
- Donnie Cochran
- John L. Finley
- Robert L. Gibson
- Richard E. Gray
- Richard J. Naughton
- Thomas Otterbein
- Robert L. Rasmussen

== Gallery ==
VF-111 F11Fs in flight over Japan, 1959

VF-111 F-8Ds refueling from a Boeing KB-50J Superfortress tanker, 1964

VF-111 F-8D firing a Zuni rocket, 1965

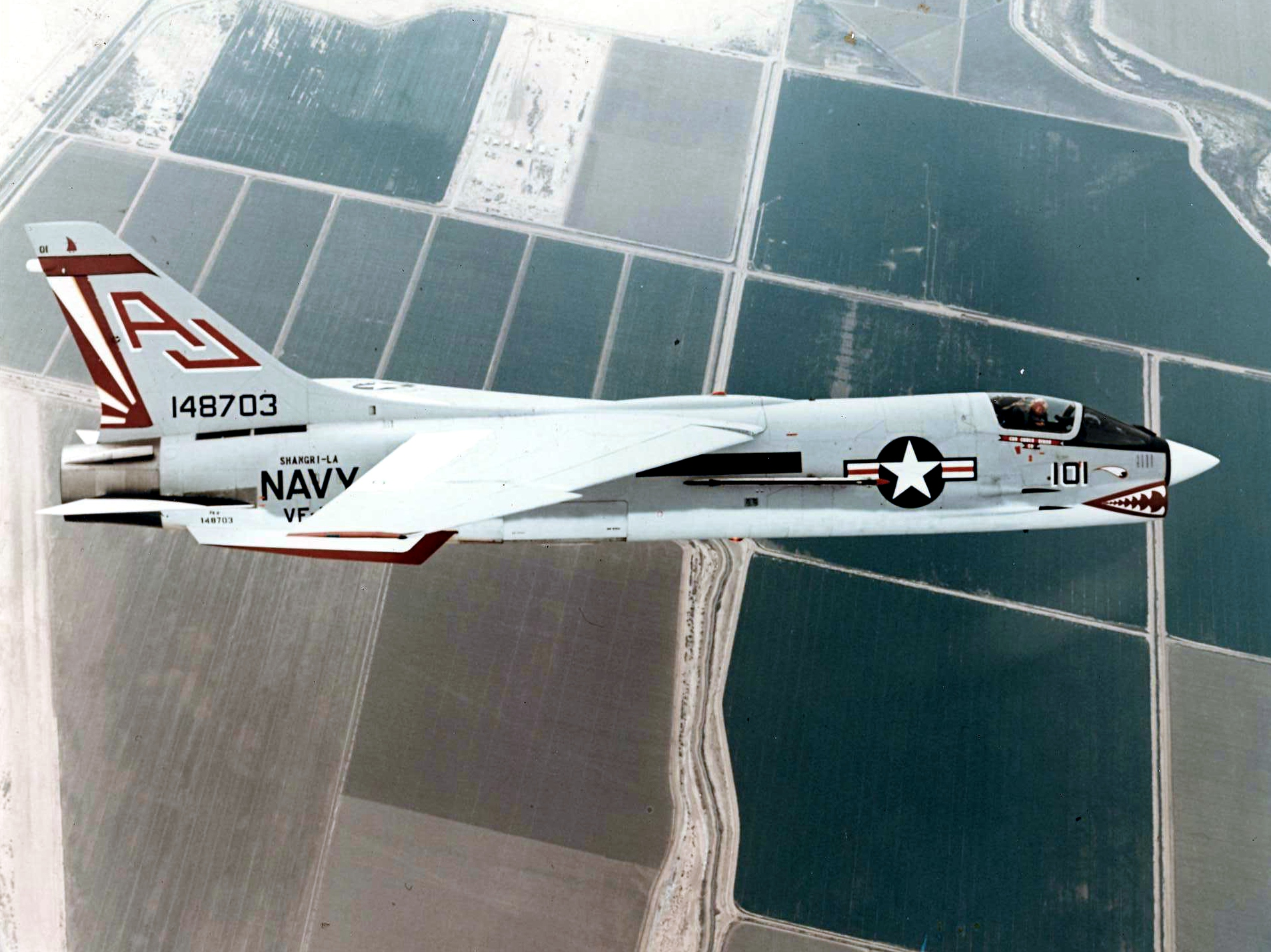
A VF-111 F-8H in flight over California, 1970

A catapult officer dressed as Santa Claus launches a VF-111 F-4B from the USS Coral Sea, 1971

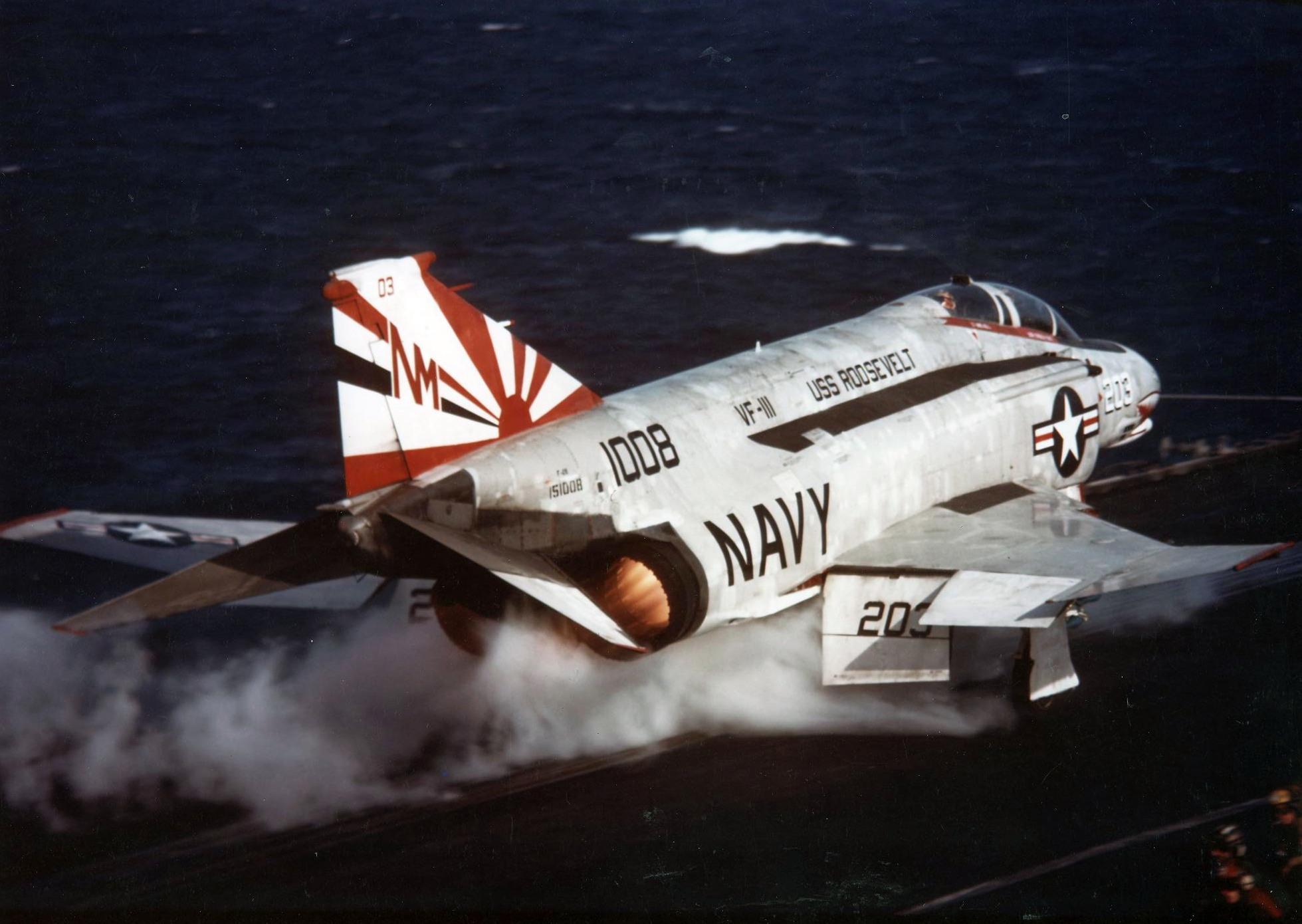
VF-111 F-4N launching from the USS Franklin D. Roosevelt, 1977

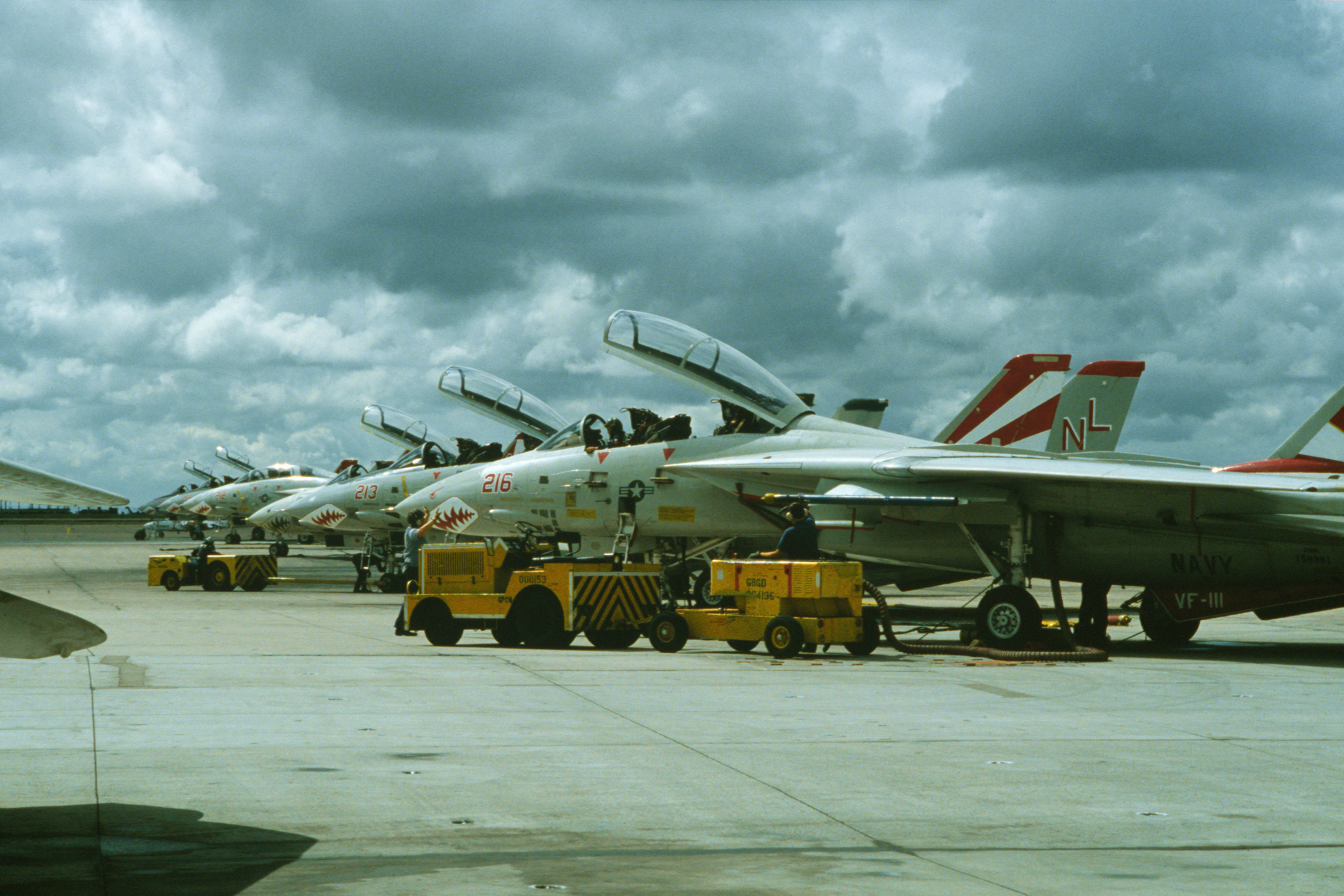
VF-111 F-14As on the flight line of NAS Miramar during Operation Gallant Eagle '82

Closeup of "shark mouth" nose markings on a VF-111 F-14A, 1982

== In popular culture ==
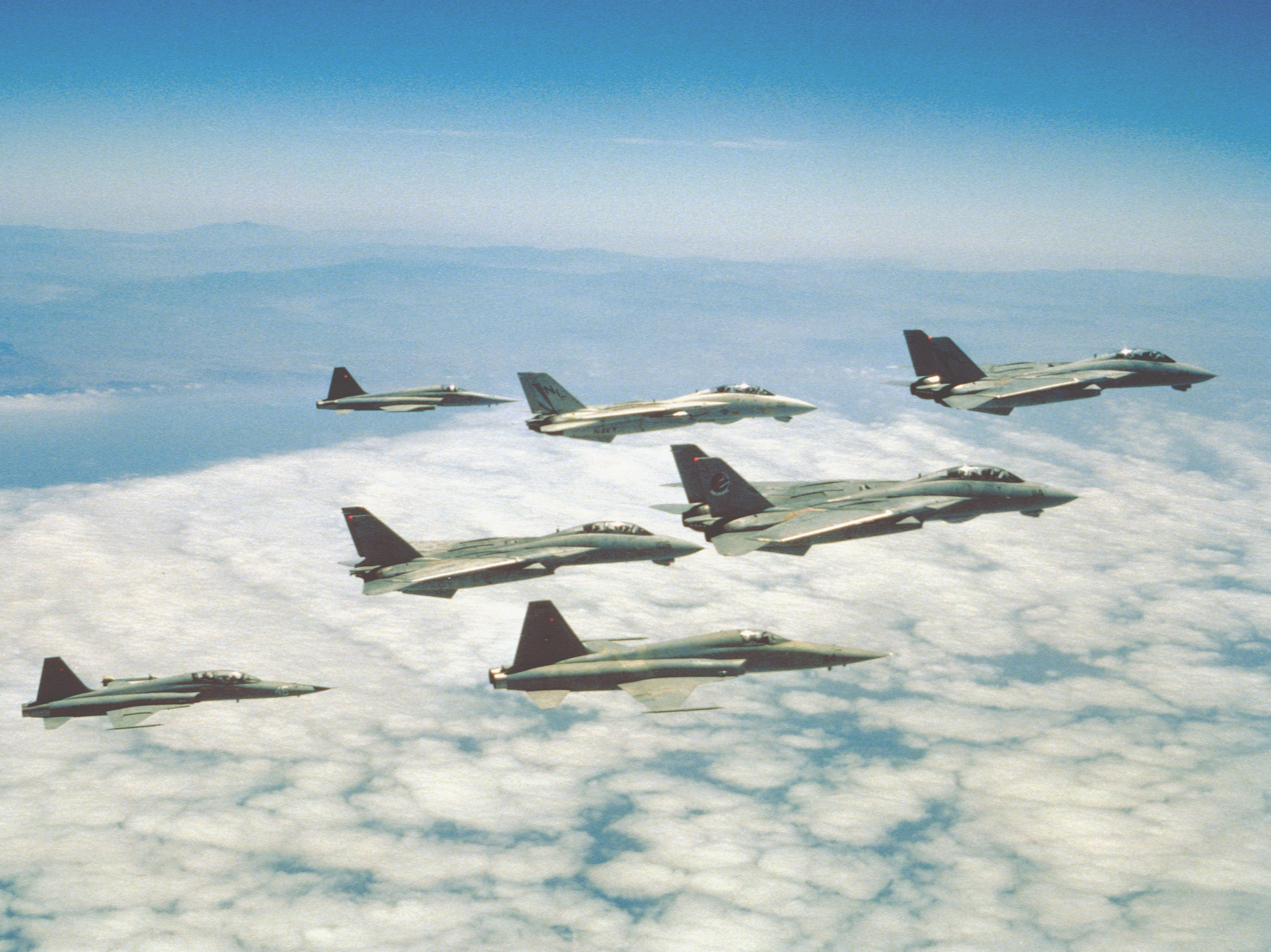
F-14A Tomcats of VF-51 and VF-111 "Sundowners". The squadrons provided F-14s for filming aerial sequences in the movie Top Gun.

In 1985, VF-111 was one of several NAS Miramar based squadrons to participate in the filming of the film Top Gun. Some VF-111 and VF-51 aircraft were repainted in fictitious squadron markings for the film. To be able to film the sequences, the F-14s were fitted with cameras mounted in pods attached to the underbelly Phoenix pallets and the under wing pylons, as well as using ground mounted cameras. Also, one of the fictional RIOs in the film, played by Clarence Gilyard, uses the callsign "Sundown" and wears a VF-111 styled helmet and squadron patch on his flight suit.

== See also ==
- History of the United States Navy
- List of inactive United States Navy aircraft squadrons
- List of United States Navy aircraft squadrons
- VFC-111

== Bibliography ==
- Barrett Tillman with Henk van der Lugt. VF-11/111 Sundowners 1942-95. Osprey, UK, 2010, ISBN 978-1846034848
- Zalin Grant. Over the Beach: The Air War in Vietnam [Paperback]. W. W. Norton & Company, 2005. ISBN 978-0393327274
