= Sigsbee Park =

Island in the Florida Keys

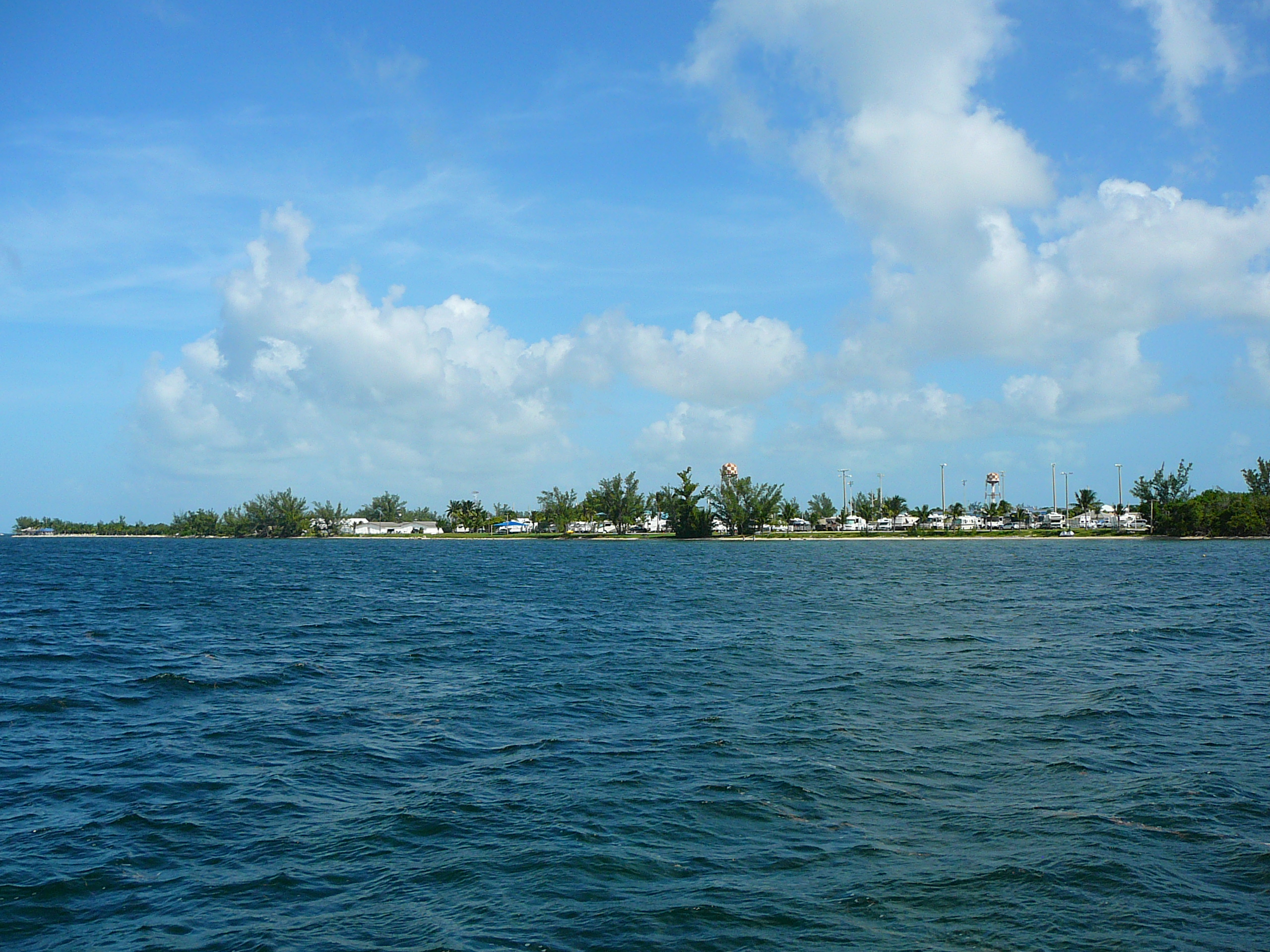
- Sigsbee Park as seen from the north.

- Sigsbee Park Sigsbee Park (the Caribbean)

Geography
- Location: Gulf of Mexico
- Coordinates: 24.580°N 81.775°W
- Archipelago: Florida Keys
- Adjacent to: Florida Straits

Administration
- United States
- State: Florida
- County: Monroe

Sigsbee Park, also known as Dredgers Key, is an island about half a mile (800 m) north of Key West island in the lower Florida Keys; administratively it is within the City of Key West, Florida, United States.

It is connected to the island of Key West by Sigsbee Road. The island and causeway are part of the Key West Naval Air Station. It is primarily used for Navy housing. It includes a Navy Exchange; commissary; elementary school; Morale, Welfare and Recreation; youth center; child development center; recreation center; RV park; and the Sunset Lounge bar & grill.

== History ==
The island was created in the 1940s from dredge spoil following the construction of Navy seaplane runways supporting the former seaplane base at nearby Trumbo Point.

== Demographics ==
Sigsbee Park has just over 500 housing units, housing a mix of military personnel and civilian base personnel. Access is restricted to authorized people with ID.

== Education ==
Sigsbee Park is served by the Monroe County School District. Its zoned schools are Sigsbee Elementary School on Sigsbee Park, and Horace O'Bryant Middle School, and Key West High School on Key West island.
