= VF-45 (1963–1996) =

U.S. Navy aviation unit

Fighter Squadron 45
- Active: 15 February 1963 – 31 March 1996
- Country: United States
- Branch: United States Navy
- Type: Fighter
- Nickname: Blackbirds

Aircraft flown
- Attack: A-4C/E Skyhawk
- Fighter: TA-4F/J Skyhawk; F-5N; F-16N

Fighter Squadron 45 or VF-45 was an aviation unit of the United States Navy. Originally established as Attack Squadron 45 (VA-45) on 15 February 1963, it was redesignated VF-45 on 7 February 1985 and disestablished on 31 March 1996. It was the third US Navy squadron to be designated VA-45 and the second US Navy squadron to be designated as VF-45. The squadron adopted the Blackbirds nickname and insignia of the second VA-45.

== Operational history ==
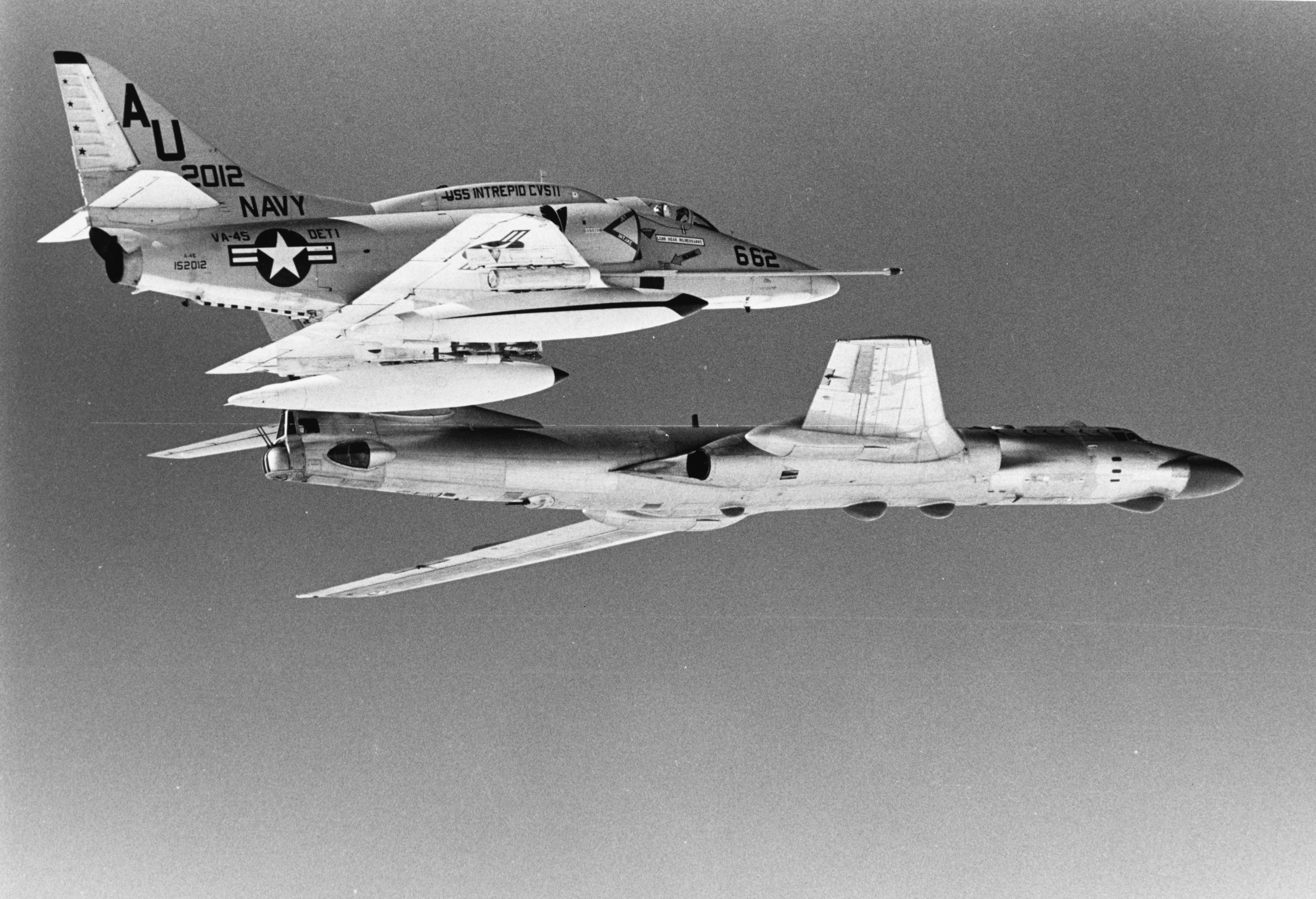
VA-45 A-4E escorts a Soviet Tu-16 c.1972

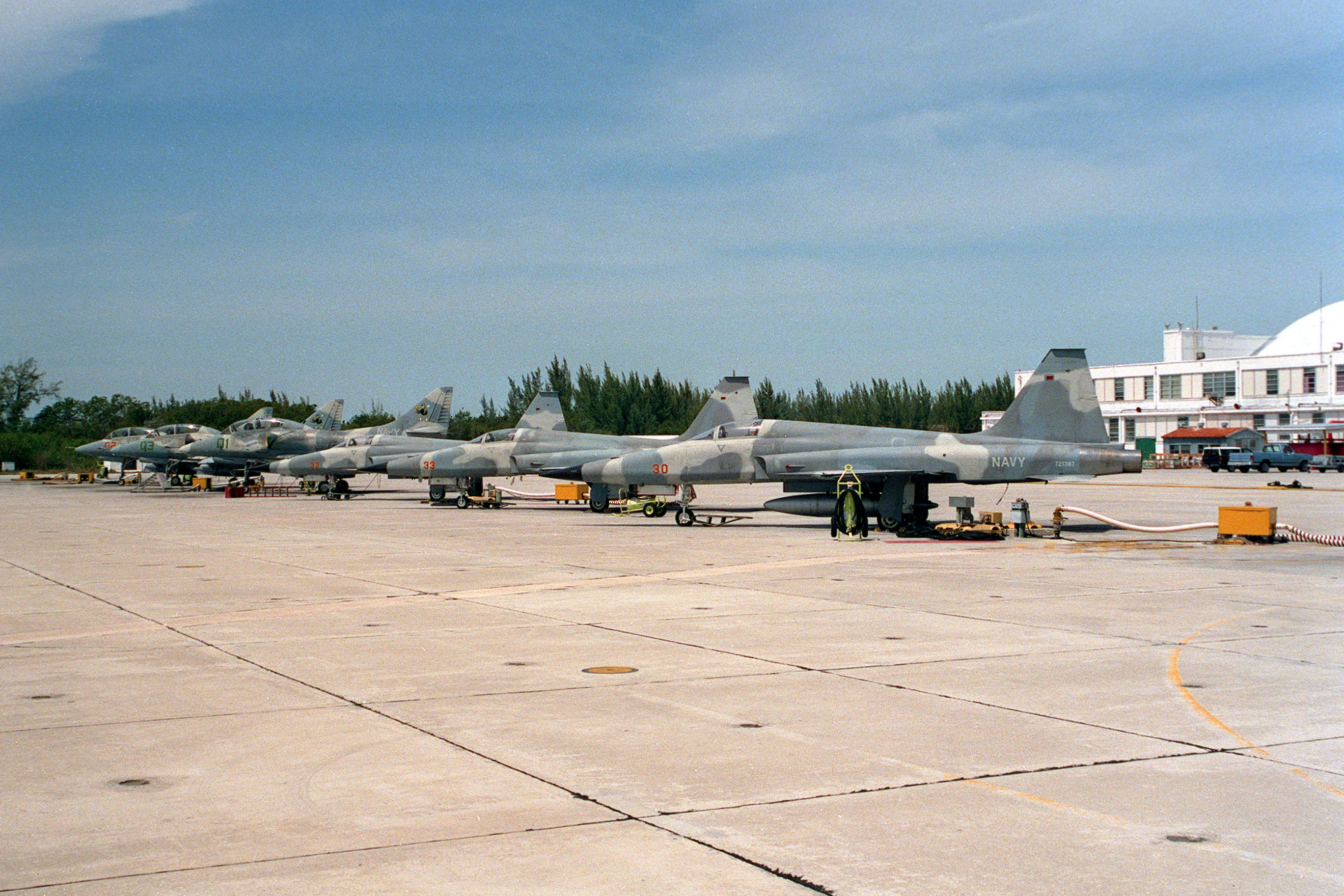
VF-45 TA-4Js and F-5Ns at NAS Key West in 1993

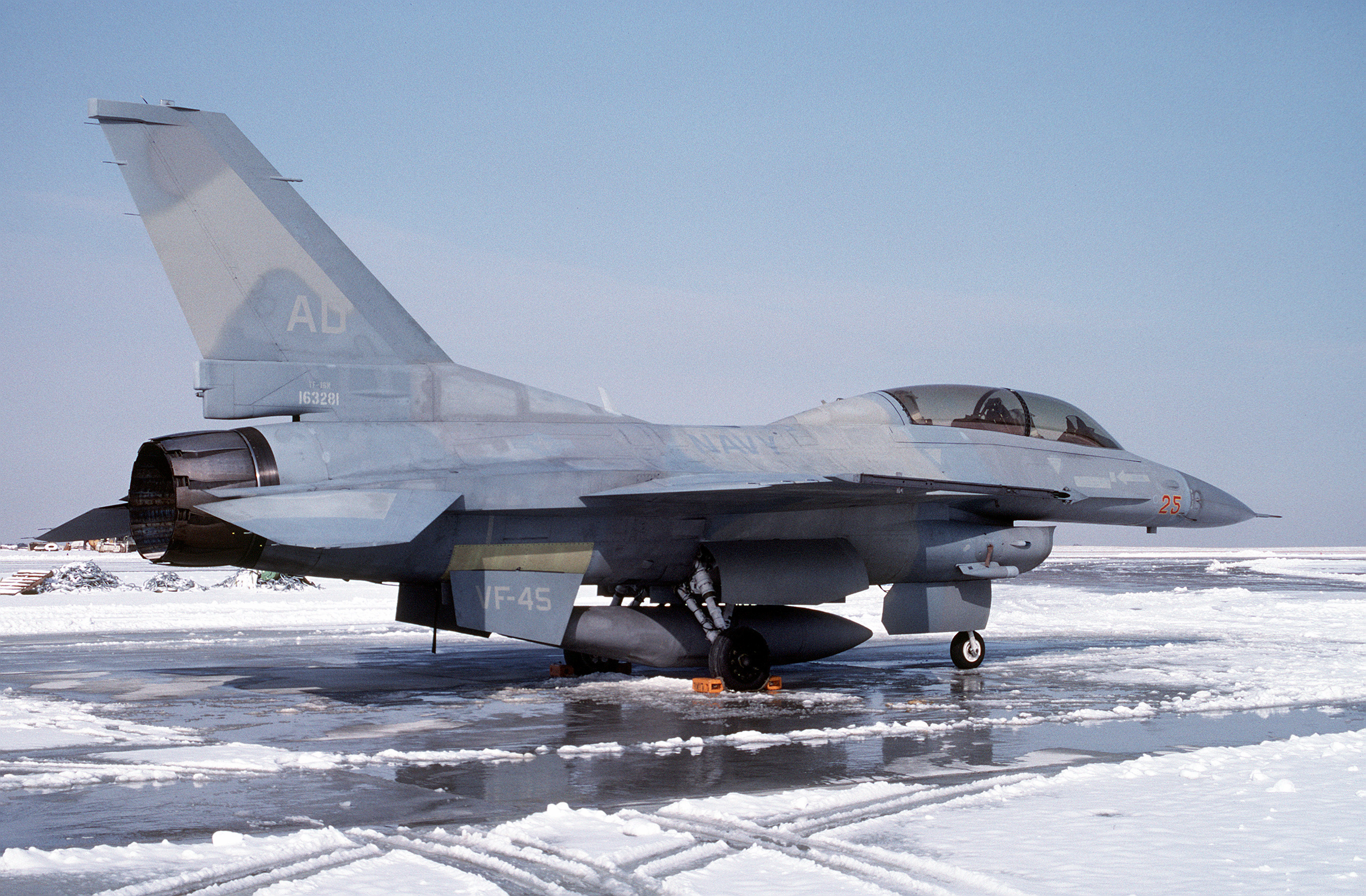
VF-45 F-16N at NAF Andrews in 1993

In February 1963 the jet training function of VA-44 at Naval Air Station Jacksonville was separated to off to form the new VA-45 at Naval Air Station Cecil Field.

VA-45 Detachment 11 was assigned to Carrier Anti-Submarine Air Group 56 (CVSG-56) aboard the USS Intrepid for a Mediterranean deployment from 16 April to 15 October 1971. VA-45 Detachment 1 was assigned to CVSG-56 aboard the Intrepid for a Mediterranean deployment from 24 November 1972 to 4 May 1973.

VF-45 was based at Naval Air Station Cecil Field and then Naval Air Station Key West to provide air combat adversary services with TA-4F/Js, F-5Ns and F-16Ns.

Following its inactivation, the role of VF-45 and other Regular Navy adversary squadrons was assumed by strike fighter and fighter composite squadrons of the Naval Air Reserve. At NAS Key West, this role is currently executed by Fighter Composite Squadron ONE ELEVEN (VFC-111) flying the F-5N and F-5F.

== See also ==
- History of the United States Navy
- List of inactive United States Navy aircraft squadrons
- List of United States Navy aircraft squadrons
