= Cudjoe Key Air Force Station =

Coordinates: 24.699°N 81.505°W

Cudjoe Key Air Force Station (earlier Cudjoe Key Missile Tracking Annex, Eglin AFB Site "No D 8") is a Formerly Used Defense Site of 68.5 acres (27.7 ha) in Monroe County, Florida, 7 mi (11 km) Northeast of Perky, Florida.

== Background ==
In February 1959, the Monroe County Commission approved extension of a potable fresh water line to what was described as a, "...missile tracking site on Cudjoe Key" being built by the U.S. Army Corps of Engineers. Activated on 16 Jun 1959 by the Army, the original mission of the site was, "...to track missiles traveling over the Eglin Gulf Test Range." The Air Force assumed operations in 1960 with test activities of the Air Force Systems Command (AFSC) at Eglin AFB, Florida having claimancy responsibilities. The site also had a concurrent air defense mission as part of the Semi-Automatic Ground Environment (SAGE) with an initial radar station site code J-08 that was later changed to Z-399 in 1963.

On 30 June 1967, Cudjoe Key AFS transferred from the claimancy of AFSC and Eglin AFB to the USAF Security Service at Goodfellow AFB, Texas after commencing a May 1967 classified mission under USAFSS auspices.

== Aerospace Defense Command / Tactical Air Command / Air Combat Command ==
On 30 September 1970, the installation transferred to the claimancy of the Aerospace Defense Command (ADC) with Tyndall Air Force Base, Florida as the custodial base, and in 1973 the first aerostat of the Tethered Aerostat Radar System (TARS) was deployed at the site, later increasing to two aerostats. With the disestablishment of ADC, the base came under the claimancy of the Tactical Air Command (TAC) in 1976.

By 1977 the site had transferred under the 671st Radar Squadron until that squadron's inactivation in 1980. The station then became a detachment of the 20th Air Division followed by the 23rd Air Division.

In 1981, a TARS aerostat at Cudjoe Key AFS broke free while being brought down prior to a storm. It was later shot down by an F-4D Phantom II aircraft from Homestead AFB. Another aerostat at Cudjoe Key AFS broke free again in 1989 and 1991.

In July 1987, the Southeast Air Defense Sector (SEADS) was reestablished and the station was redesignated as Detachment 3, SEADS.

With TAC's disestablishment in 1992, the installation came under the claimancy of the Air Combat Command (ACC). On 1 October 1995, the Southeast Air Defense Sector was reassigned to the Florida Air National Guard and SEADS was re-designated Southeast Air Defense Sector (ANG) and came under the Continental NORAD Region (CONR) Headquarters at Tyndall AFB.

On 1 November 2005, SEADS ceased air defense operations and its duties were absorbed into the Northeast Air Defense Sector which was renamed Eastern Air Defense Sector. The former SEADS transformed into the 601st Air and Space Operations Center at Tyndall AFB and currently performs the duties as the Air Operations Center for 1st Air Force / Air Forces Northern (1AF/AFNORTH), the USAF component command of United States Northern Command (USNORTHCOM).

In 2007 a private Cessna 182Q Skylane that had departed Key West International Airport collided with the TARS tethers, killing the pilot and 2 passengers.. The aircraft had violated a 15,000 foot, 3 nautical mile radius restricted area around the Cudjoe Key AFS TARS site.

== Customs and Border Protection ==
In 2013, the TARS at Cudjoe Key was identified for shutdown/deflation due to budget cuts imposed by the Budget Control Act of 2011, otherwise known as sequestration. Petition signatures among citizens in the Lower Keys were gathered to keep the "Fat Albert" aerostats at the station.

In 2014, responsibility for the TARS at Cudjoe Key was transferred from the U.S. Air Force to Customs and Border Protection (CBP) of the U.S. Department of Homeland Security (DHS) and Cudjoe Key AFS became a DHS facility. As of October 2016, Cudjoe Key was one of eight TARS sites operated by CBP.
