= VF-111 =

Fighter Squadron 111
- VF-111 squadron patch
- Active: 10 October 1942 - 19 January 1959
- Country: United States
- Branch: United States Navy
- Engagements: World War II; Korean War

Aircraft flown
- Fighter: F4F Wildcat; F6F Hellcat; F8F Bearcat; F9F-2 Panther; F9F-8 Cougar; FJ-3 Fury

Fighter Squadron 111 (VF-111), also known as the Sundowners, was a fighter squadron of the United States Navy. Originally established as Fighter Squadron 11 (VF-11) on 10 October 1942, it was redesignated as VF-11A on 15 November 1946, redesignated as VF-111 on 15 July 1948 and disestablished on 19 January 1959. On 20 January, another squadron, VF-111 (1956-95) then assumed the designation until its de-establishment in 1995. In November 2006, VFC-13 Detachment Key West was redesignated as VFC-111, taking on the Sundowner insignia and callsign.

== History ==
3 distinct Navy squadrons have called themselves ‘Sundowners’. The U.S. Navy frequently has given the same designation to two or more aviation units, leading to lasting confusion. Officially, the U.S. Navy does not recognize a direct lineage with disestablished squadrons if a new squadron is formed with the same designation. However, historical tradition within the Naval Aviation community is such that a new squadron will assume the nickname, insignia, and traditions of the earlier squadron(s) with its designation.

=== World War II ===
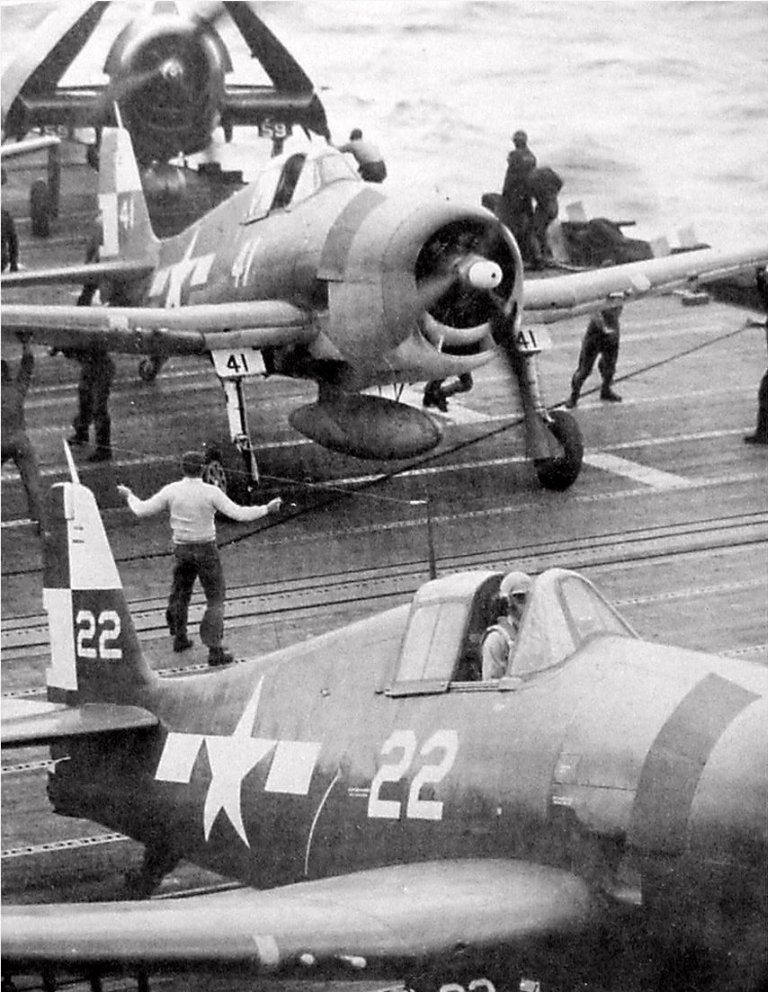
VF-11 F6Fs aboard the USS Hornet in 1945

VF-11 was established at NAS North Island California on 10 October 1942 equipped with F4F Wildcats, and on 23 October was on its way to Hawaii. To epitomize its spirit and tactical superiority over the Japanese, the squadron decided it would be called the 'Sundowners' and its insignia depicts two Wildcats shooting down a Rising Sun.

From April to July 1943 VF-11 downed 55 enemy aircraft in aerial combat at Guadalcanal. After return to the U.S. and re-equipping with F6F Hellcats, VF-11 deployed on USS Hornet in October 1944. From then until February 1945 the squadron engaged in strike and air-to-air combat missions resulting in the shoot down of 102 enemy aircraft with dozens more destroyed on the ground. As a direct result of its combat record, the squadron was awarded the Presidential Unit Citation.

VF-11A equipped with F8F Bearcats was assigned to Carrier Air Group 11 (CVG-11) aboard the USS Valley Forge for her world cruise from 9 October 1947 to 11 June 1948

=== 1950s ===
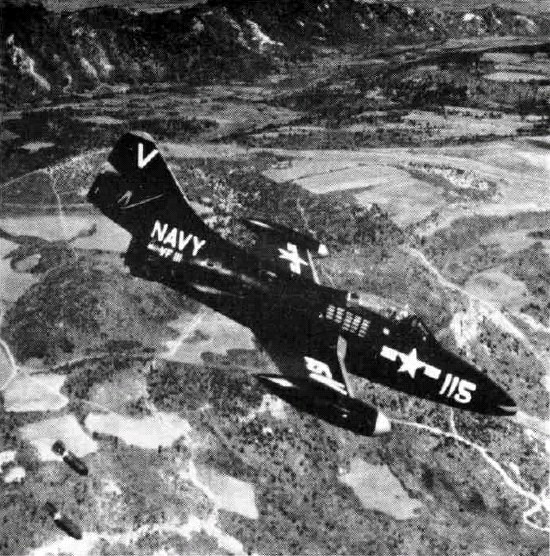
VF-111 F9F-2 dropping bombs over Korea, 1951-52

On 9 November 1950, early in the Korean War, Lieutenant Commander William T. Amen scored the first combat manned jet-on-jet kill, downing a Soviet MiG-15 while flying a Grumman F9F-2B Panther from the USS Philippine Sea. Two more Korean cruises were made in USS Valley Forge in 1951-52, then USS Boxer and USS Lake Champlain in 1953.

After Korea, VF-111 flew the F9F-8 Cougar and the FJ-3 Fury for three deployments to the Western Pacific aboard the carriers USS Lexington, USS Wasp, and USS Bennington.

VF-111 was disestablished on 19 January 1959.

On 20 January 1959, Attack Squadron 156 (VA-156) was redesignated as VF-111, thus continuing the Sundowner tradition, but not the unit lineage. For more information on this later squadron, see VF-111 (1956-95).

== Sundowner Aces ==
- LT Charles R. Stimpson 16;
- LT James E. Swope 10;
- LT Jimmie E. Savage 7;
- LTJG Horace B. Moranville 6;
- LCDR Robert E. Clements 5;
- LTJG Vernon E. Graham 5;
- LT Henry S. White 5;

Other aces who scored kills with the Sundowners were: LT William N. Leonard, LTJG William J. Masoner, LTJG John A. Zink and Commander Antonio T. Pimentel. CDR Earl G. Clouser.

== See also ==
- History of the United States Navy
- List of inactive United States Navy aircraft squadrons
- List of United States Navy aircraft squadrons
