= Charles R. Stimpson =

US Navy fighter ace in World War II

- Born: August 24, 1919; Salt Lake City, Utah
- Died: August 20, 1983 (aged 63); Naval Air Station Miramar
- Military career
- Allegiance: United States
- Branch: United States Navy
- Service years: 1941–1956
- Nickname: Skull
- Conflicts: World War II
- Awards: Navy Cross; Distinguished Flying Cross (3); Air Medal (3)

Charles Russell Stimpson (24 August 1919 – 20 August 1983) was a United States Navy fighter ace in World War II.

== Biography ==
Born in Salt Lake City, Utah, Stimpson graduated from Pomona College in 1941 and enlisted in the navy as an aviation cadet. He received his commission and aviator wings in May 1942 and was assigned to Fighting Squadron 11, which became known as The Sundowners.

Flying Grumman F4F Wildcats from Guadalcanal in the summer of 1943, "Skull" Stimpson shot down six Japanese aircraft. He remained with the squadron during its second combat deployment, flying Grumman F6F Hellcats from USS Hornet (CV-12) in the Western Pacific during late 1944. He scored ten more kills, including five confirmed and two probables off Formosa on 14 October.

At the end of the war Stimpson was the Sundowners' top ace with 16 victories, receiving the Navy Cross, three Distinguished Flying Crosses, and three Air Medals.

Released from active duty in October 1945, Stimpson participated in the naval reserve program until 1956. He settled in the San Diego area, having married into the hotel business. He was widely known as the genial, popular host of The Inn at Rancho Santa Fe, California, but maintained his interest in aviation. He died at a Blue Angels performance at NAS Miramar shortly before his 64th birthday.
