= Naval Air Station Key West =

United States military installation

- Boca Chica Field
- Near Key West, Florida in the United States
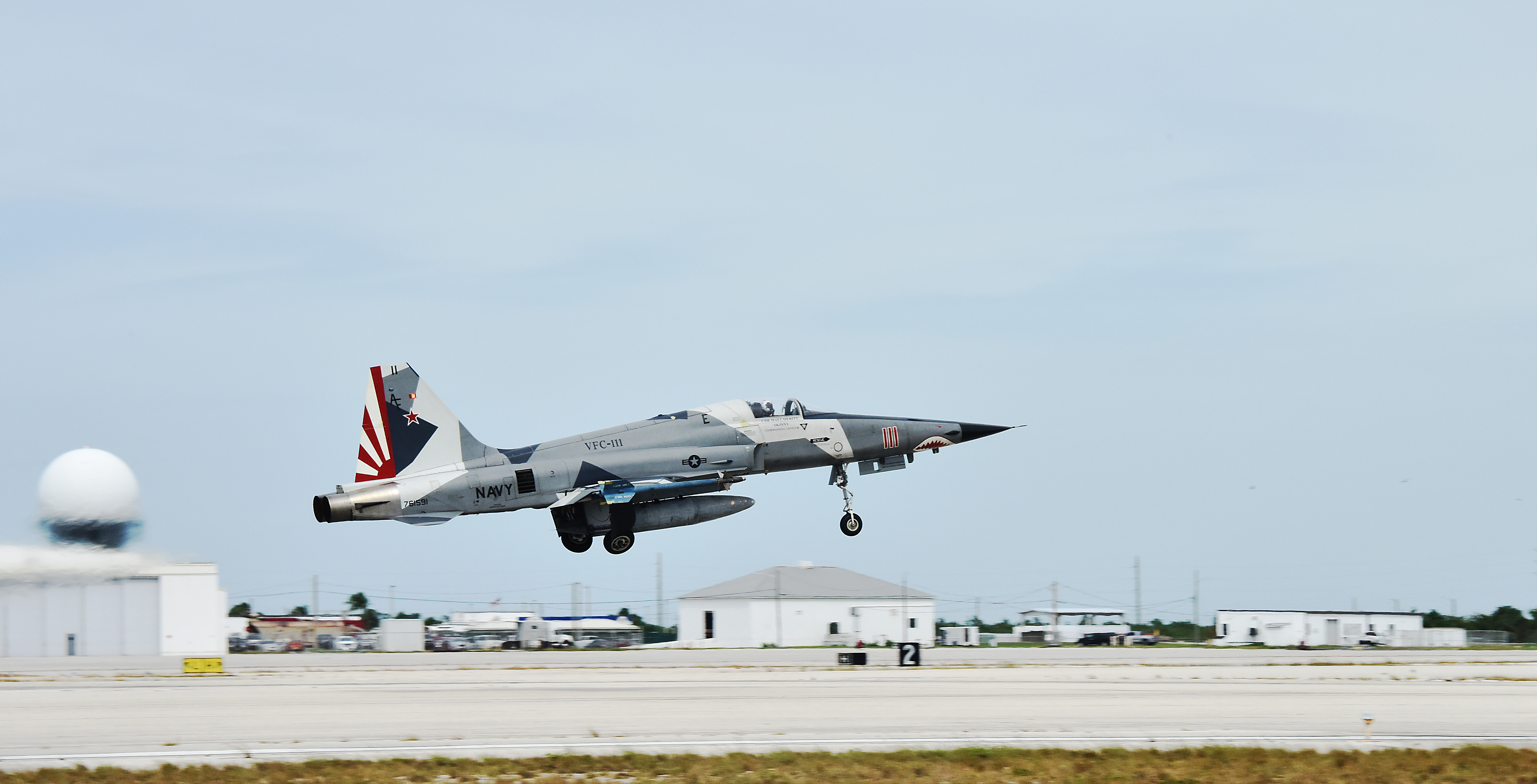
- A US Navy F-5N Tiger II of VFC-111 takes off from its home at NAS Key West during November 2020

Site information
- Type: Naval Air Station
- Owner: Department of Defense
- Operator: US Navy
- Controlled by: Navy Region Southeast
- Condition: Operational
- Website: Official website

Location
- Location in the United States
- Coordinates: 24°34′33″N 081°41′20″W

Site history
- Built: 1917
- In use: 1917 – present

Garrison information
- Current commander: Captain Elizabeth Regoli

Airfield information
- Identifiers: IATA: NQX, ICAO: KNQX, FAA LID: NQX, WMO: 722015
- Elevation: 1.7 metres (5 ft 7 in) AMSL
Runways
Direction	Length and surface
08/26	3,048.3 metres (10,001 ft) Porous European Mix (PEM)
04/22	2,134.21 metres (7,002 ft) PEM
14/32	2,133.9 metres (7,001 ft) PEM

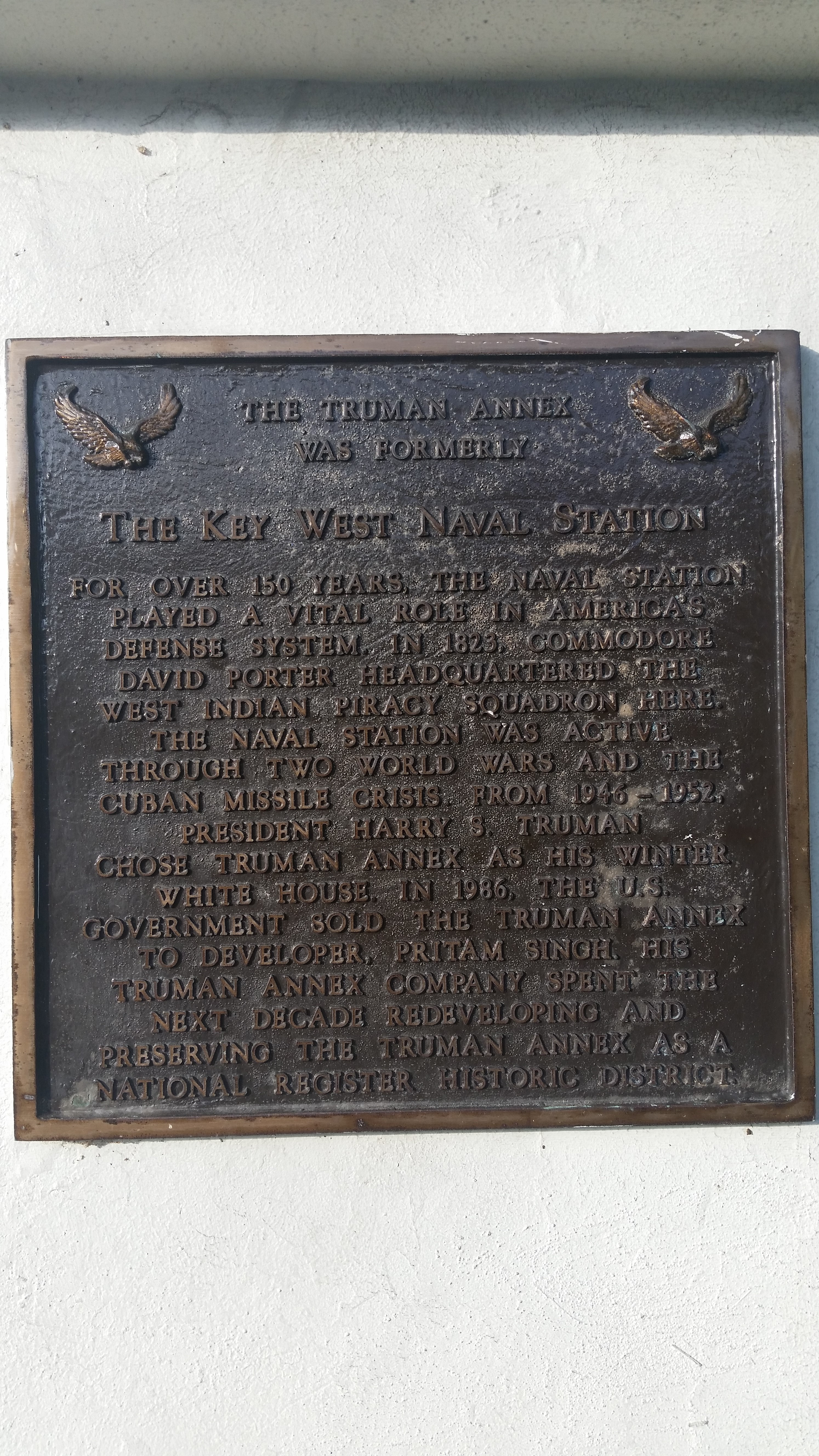
Marker for the Truman Annex, Key West Naval Station

Naval Air Station Key West (IATA: NQX, ICAO: KNQX, FAA LID: NQX), is a naval air station and military airport located on Boca Chica Key, four miles (6 km) east of the central business district of Key West, Florida, United States.

NAS Key West is an air-to-air combat training facility for fighter aircraft of all military services, with favorable flying conditions year round and nearby aerial ranges. The station and its associated offshore air combat maneuvering ranges are equipped with the P5 Combat Training System/Tactical Combat Training System (P5CTS/TCTS) which tracks and records aerial maneuvers.

On a broader scale, NAS Key West's national security mission supports operational and readiness requirements for the Department of Defense, Department of Homeland Security (e.g., U.S. Coast Guard), Air National Guard and Army National Guard units, other federal agencies, and allied military forces.

The air station is also host to several tenant commands, including Fighter Squadron Composite 111 (VFC-111), Strike Fighter Squadron 106 (VFA-106) Detachment Key West, the U.S. Army Special Forces Underwater Operations School and Headquarters, Joint Interagency Task Force South (JIATF South).

== History ==
=== 1823–1914 ===
The U.S. Navy's presence in Key West dates back to 1823 when a Naval Base was established to stop piracy in this area. The lower Keys were home to many wealthy shipping merchants whose fleets operated from these waters. This drew the interest of pirates who used the Florida Keys as a base from which to prey on shipping lanes. The base was expanded during the Mexican–American War, with the construction of Fort Zachary Taylor and other fortifications in the Key West area commencing in 1845 and continuing through to its completion in 1866. The base also figured prominently during the Spanish–American War. In 1898, the battleship Maine sailed from Key West to Havana, Cuba, where it later exploded while at anchor and sank. The sinking of the Maine resulted in the United States declaring war on Spain, and the entire U.S. Atlantic Fleet moved to Key West for the duration of the war.

=== World War I ===
During World War I (1914–1918) the base was expanded again, and in 1917, a U.S. naval submarine base was established on the main island of Key West on what is now naval air station "annex" property. Its mission during World War I was to supply oil to the U.S. fleet and to block German ships from reaching Mexican oil supplies.

The nation's southernmost Naval Base proved to be an ideal year-round training facility with rapid access to the open sea lanes and ideal flying conditions for Naval Aviation. The Navy's forces were expanded to include seaplanes, submarines, and blimps. Ground was broken for construction of a small coastal air patrol station on 13 July 1917 at what is now Trumbo Point on land leased from the Florida East Coast Railway Company. The project involved dredging, erection of station buildings, three seaplane ramps, a dirigible hangar, a hydrogenerator plant, and temporary barracks.

On 22 September of that year, the base's log book recorded the first naval flight ever made from Key West – a Curtiss N-9 seaplane flown by U.S. Coast Guard Lieutenant Stanley Parker. About three months later, on 18 December, Naval Air Base Key West was commissioned and LT Parker became the first Commanding Officer.

Naval Air Base Key West pilots flew in search of German submarines resting on the surface to recharge batteries. The aircraft was armed only with a single machine gun, but gunners were supplied with hand grenades. The slow Curtiss biplanes flew low over surfaced subs, and gunners dropped grenades into open conning towers. Naval aviation antisubmarine warfare was beginning to prove itself in combat.

On 18 January 1918, the first class of student aviators arrived for seaplane training, which launched the station's reputation as a premier training site for Naval Aviators, a reputation which continues today. The base was primarily used for antisubmarine patrol operations and as an elemental flight training station, with more than 500 aviators trained at the station during World War I.

=== Interwar period ===
After World War I, the base was decommissioned and its personnel were transferred or released. Most of the buildings were destroyed or dismantled and moved to other locations. The remaining facilities were used only occasionally during 1920–1930 for seaplane training. The station remained inactive until 1939.

The seaplane base was designated as a Naval Air Station Key West on 15 December 1940 and served as an operating and training base for fleet aircraft squadrons, to include seaplane, land-based aircraft, carrier-based aircraft and lighter-than-air blimp squadrons. This set the stage for America's entry into World War II. The government had retained the property during the interwar period of the 1920s and 1930s, which proved to be a wise decision as the nation scrambled to re-arm in a state of emergency at the outbreak of the war.

=== World War II ===
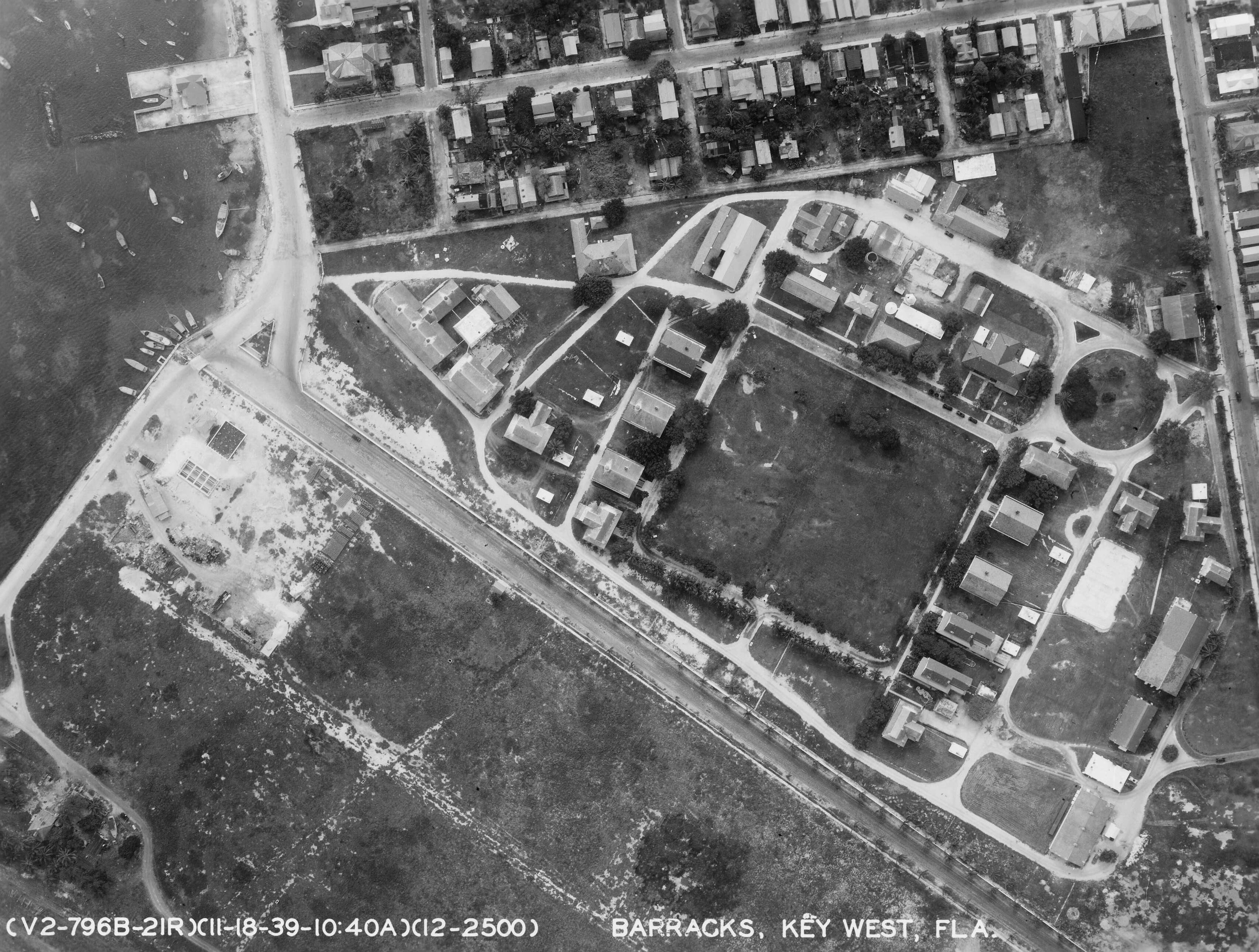
Barracks, Dec. 1939

Naval Base Key West was reopened just prior to the United States' entry into World War II to support Navy destroyers, submarines, patrol craft and PBY flying boat and amphibious aircraft. Other satellite facilities were established to support other war efforts, including Meachum Field for lighter-than-air blimp operations on Key West, and runways for land-based and carrier-based aircraft on Boca Chica Key.

By 1943, German Navy submarines were operating so near Key West that they were sinking allied ships within sight of land. Submarine raids peaked in May of that year, when 49 ships were torpedoed off the coast of Florida. As the war continued, German submarines were progressively attrited by U.S. Navy and Allied antisubmarine warfare forces and German torpedo raids by U-boats decreased. In March 1945, the satellite airfields, some previously known as Naval Auxiliary Air Facility Boca Chica and Naval Auxiliary Air Station Boca Chica were disestablished and combined into a single aviation activity designated as U.S. Naval Air Station, Key West.

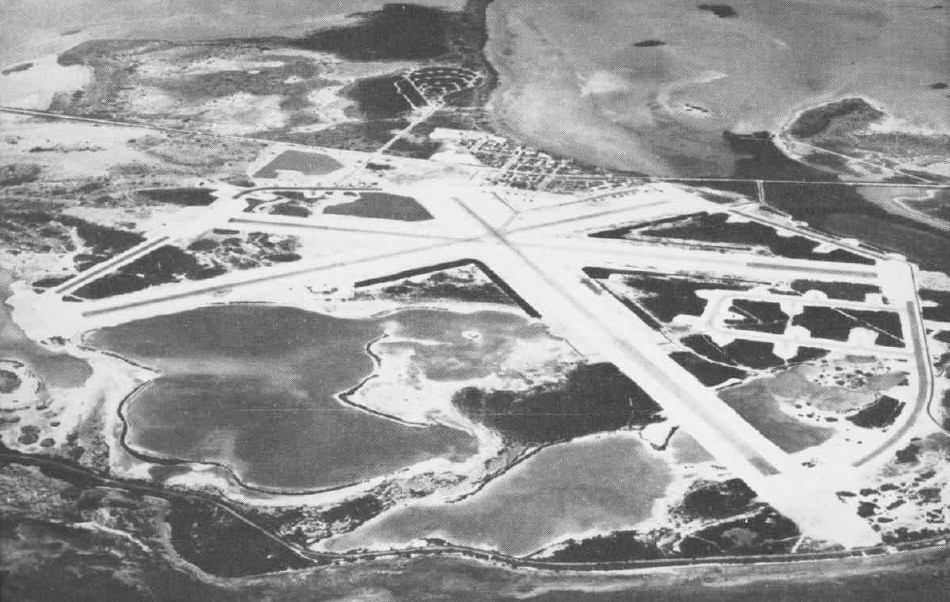
Aerial view of NAS Key West in the 1940s

=== Cold War ===
After World War II ended, NAS Key West was retained as a training facility. On 1 June 1962, the Navy AN/FPS-37 Radar site was added to the United States Air Force (USAF) Air Defense Command Semi Automatic Ground Environment (SAGE) network feeding data to DC-09 at Gunter AFB, Alabama. The USAF 671st Radar Squadron was activated and NAS Key West was designated as NORAD ID "Z-209". During the Cuban Missile Crisis, the United States Army moved in Nike Hercules anti-aircraft surface-to-air missiles, of the 6th Missile Battalion, 65th Artillery, from Fort Meade, in the Homestead and Miami area. MIM-23 Hawk surface to air missiles were set up in and around Key West using the radar facilities. ARADCOM designated the site as AADCP site KW-18DC under the Homestead-Miami Defense Area. The Cudjoe Key AFS site was also added to the SAGE network at that time (Z-399), being operated by contractors. A battalion of the 65th Artillery (later to become the 65th Air Defense Artillery) was to stay until 1979. 6-65 ADA became 1-65 ADA on 13 September 1972; the battalion stayed in the area until June 1979, when it was moved to Fort Bliss.

NAS Key West was to become a focal point during the 1962 Cuban Missile Crisis, which posed the first doorstep threat to the United States in more than a century. Reconnaissance and operational flights were begun 22 October 1962, in support of the blockade around Cuba. During the Missile Crisis, Key West cemented its claim to the title "Gibraltar of the Gulf", coined over a hundred years earlier by Commodore David Porter.

By 1964, the USAF added an AN/FPS-6A height-finder radar at NAS Key West, which was modified to an AN/FPS-90 set when a second radar was added. Routine general radar surveillance was performed by the USAF at NAS Key West until 1988, upgrading the radar to an AN/FPS-67B in 1966. In 1979, the 671st Radar Squadron was replaced by the 20th Air Defense Squadron, Operating Location Alpha Juliet (OL-AJ). By 1988, the last of the two AN/FPS-90 sets was removed. Today, an ARSR-4 radar is part of the Joint Surveillance System (JSS), designated by NORAD as Southeast Air Defense Sector (SEADS) Ground Equipment Facility "J-07". Literally built up from sea bottom, reefs, tidal areas and mangrove swamps, all of the NAS Key West sites, including the Harry S. Truman Annex (formerly Naval Station Key West), Trumbo Point, Meacham Field (Key West International Airport), and Boca Chica, were now permanently etched in military history.

In 1946, Air Test and Evaluation Squadron 1 (VX-1) was established at NAS Key West and for the next three decades conducted airborne antisubmarine warfare (ASW) systems evaluation out of Boca Chica, while Helicopter Antisubmarine Squadron 1 (HS-1) conducted Atlantic Fleet helicopter fleet replacement training in the SH-3 Sea King out of the former seaplane base at Trumbo Point. This continued until the late 1960s/early 1970s when these squadrons relocated to NAS Patuxent River, Maryland and NAS Jacksonville, Florida, respectively, with HS-1 having an intermediate base assignment to NAS Quonset Point, Rhode Island prior to its final relocation to NAS Jacksonville.

In the 1970s, Tactical Electronic Warfare Squadron 33 (VAQ-33) relocated to NAS Key West from NAS Norfolk, Virginia with a mix of NC-121K, ERA-3B / TA-3B / KA-3B Skywarrior, EA-6A Intruder, EA-4F Skyhawk II, EP-3 Orion and the sole example of the EF-4B/EF-4J Phantom II aircraft. Reporting as an element of the Fleet Electronic Warfare Support Group (FEWSG), the squadron provided "Orange Air" electronic adversary services for fleet training until its disestablishment the early 1990s. VAQ-33 was also the last A-3 Fleet Replacement Squadron (FRS) and Fleet Readiness Aviation Maintenance Personnel (FRAMP) school, providing training for A-3 Skywarrior pilots, navigators, electronic warfare officers, enlisted aircrewmen and maintenance personnel. VAQ-33 remained at NAS Key West until it was inactivated in 1993.

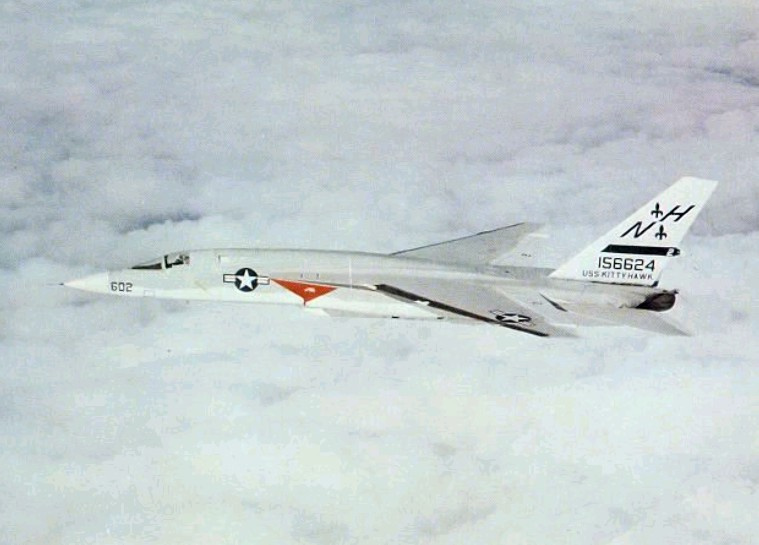
RA-5C BuNo 156624 of RVAH-6. This aircraft is now preserved at the National Naval Aviation Museum at NAS Pensacola.

In 1973, Reconnaissance Attack Wing 1 (RECONATKWING ONE) began relocation from the closing NAS Albany, Georgia with its RA-5C Vigilante, TA-3B Skywarrior and TA-4F/J Skyhawk II aircraft. An operational/deployable fleet unit, the wing relocated Reconnaissance Attack Squadron THREE (RVAH-3), the single site RA-5C Fleet Replacement Squadron (FRS), to NAS Key West, as well as nine other deployable Vigilante squadrons (RVAH-1, RVAH-5, RVAH-6, RVAH-7, RVAH-9, RVAH-11, RVAH-12 and RVAH-13 (RVAH-14 disestablished at NAS Albany prior to relocation) that routinely embarked with Atlantic Fleet and Pacific Fleet carrier air wings aboard Forrestal, Kitty Hawk, Enterprise and Nimitz class aircraft carriers. All RVAH squadrons were in place at NAS Key West by late 1974 and all were eventually decommissioned over a six-year period that coincided with the phased retirement of the RA-5C. Following decommissioning of the last RA-5C squadron, RVAH-7, Reconnaissance Attack Wing ONE subsequently stood down in early 1980.

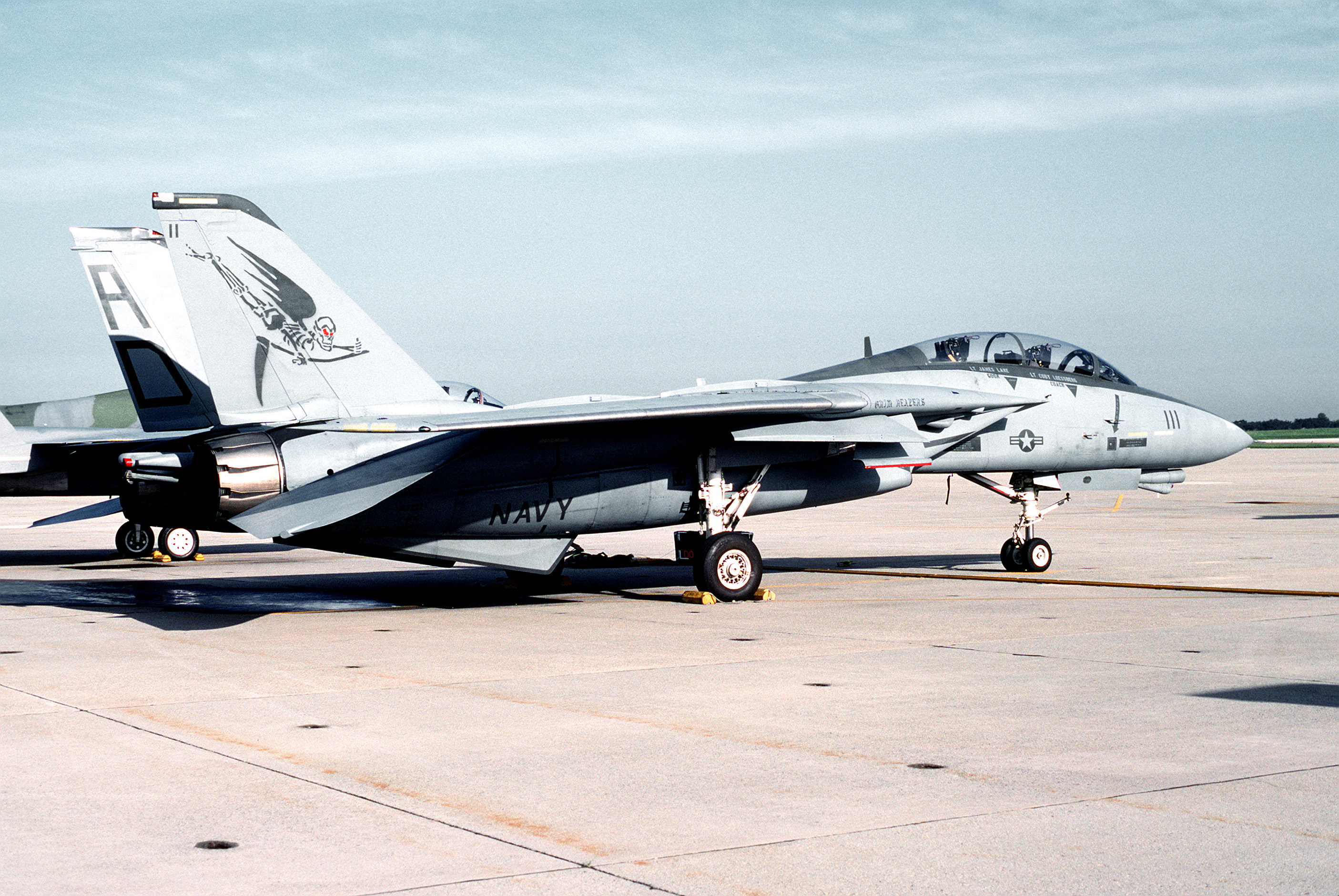
F-14B BuNo 163222 of VF-101

Due to its superb flying weather, NAS Key West has also hosted several permanent detachments of the fighter and strike fighter Fleet Replacement Squadrons (FRS) at NAS Oceana, Virginia. This includes the former Atlantic Fleet F-4 Phantom II FRS, Fighter Squadron 171 (VF-171), from the 1970s through the 1980s; and the former Atlantic Fleet F-4 and then F-14 Tomcat FRS, Fighter Squadron 101 (VF-101), from the 1960s through 1970s in the F-4 and the 1970s through 2005 in the F-14. The focus of both of these detachments revolved around the Fleet Fighter Air Readiness Program (FFARP).

The Atlantic Fleet F/A-18 Hornet and F/A-18E/F Super Hornet Fleet Replacement Squadron, Strike Fighter Squadron 106 (VFA-106), based at NAS Cecil Field, Florida until 1999 and since based at NAS Oceana, continues to maintain an NAS Key West detachment to this day in support of FFARP's successor, the Strike Fighter Advanced Readiness Program (SFARP).

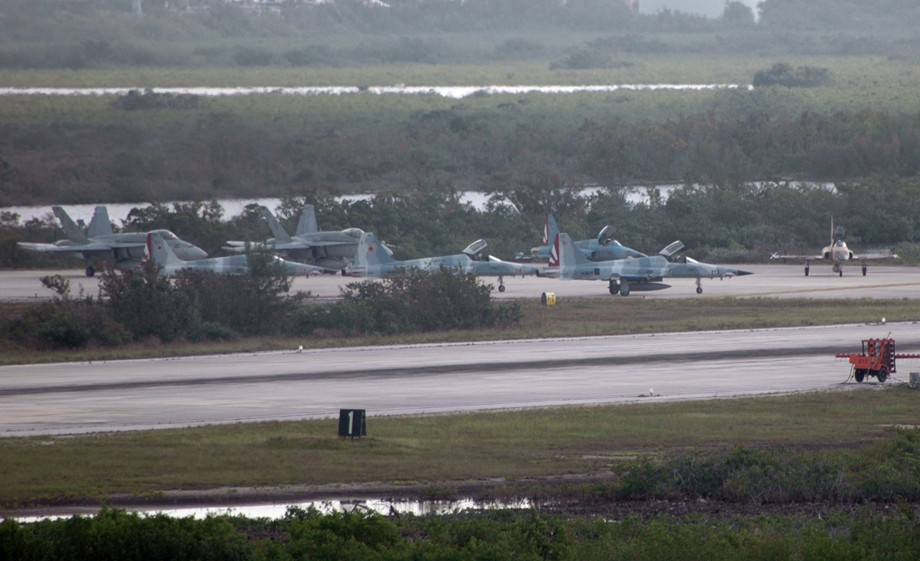
VFA-106 F/A-18Cs and VFC-111 F-5Ns at NAS Key West, 2007

During the 1980s and 1990s, Fighter Squadron 45 (VF-45) was also based at NAS Key West to provide air combat adversary services with A-4 Skyhawk II, F-5E/F Freedom Fighter and F-16N Fighting Falcon aircraft. Decommissioned in the late 1990s due to post-Cold War budget cuts, VF-45's former mission at NAS Key West is now performed by Fighter Composite Squadron 111 (VFC-111), an active duty integrated Navy Reserve squadron flying the F-5N and F-5F.

=== Late Cold War / Post-Cold War / Present day ===
During the 1980s and into the mid-1990s, NAS Key West's Trumbo Point Annex and Truman Annex waterfront pier areas served as the home port for the Pegasus-class hydrofoils of Patrol Hydrofoil Missile Squadron TWO (PHMRON TWO).

In the late summer of 1994, NAS Key West also served as a primary staging base for Operations Support Democracy and Uphold Democracy in Haiti. The station hosted a wide variety of military aircraft during this period, to include multiple U.S. Navy P-3C Orion aircraft, USAF E-3A Sentry AWACS aircraft and the Pennsylvania Air National Guard's EC-130E Hercules "Commando Solo" aircraft that were engaged in the operations.

On 5 October 2001, Naval Air Station Key West was temporarily downgraded and redesignated as Naval Air Facility Key West, but on 1 April 2003, the air facility was upgraded and restored back to full air station status as Naval Air Station Key West.

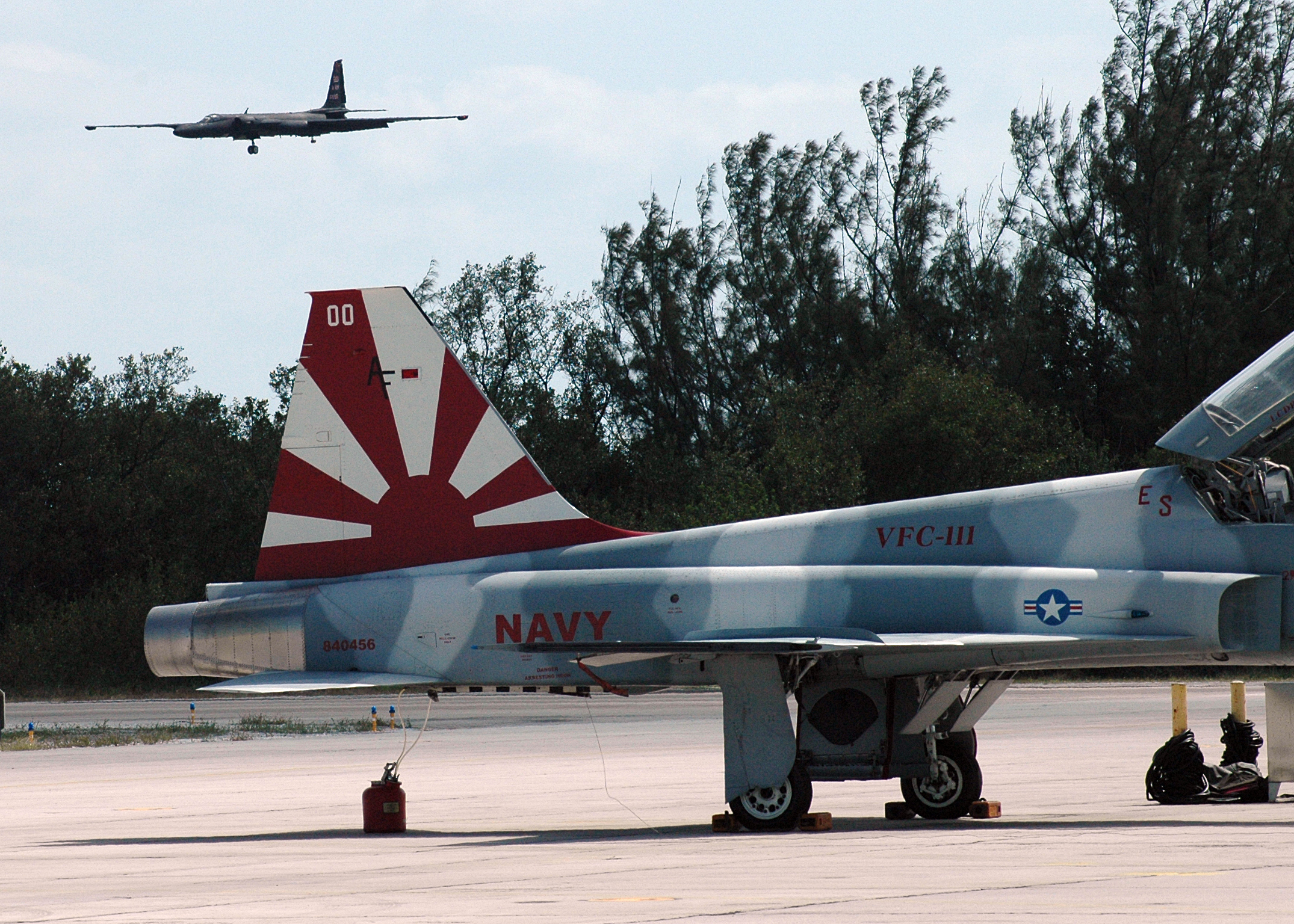
USAF 9th Reconnaissance Wing U-2S landing at NAS Key West in 2008 with a VFC-111 F-5N in foreground.

As in the past, NAS Key West continues to be frequently utilized for detachments by active and reserve U.S. Navy strike fighter squadrons and carrier airborne early warning squadrons, U.S. Marine Corps attack and fighter/attack squadrons, and USAF, Air Force Reserve and Air National Guard fighter and rescue squadrons for exercises, and unit level training/continuation training. The Naval Air Training Command also uses NAS Key West for Naval Aviator and Naval Flight Officer training detachments, primarily student Naval Aviators in the strike aircraft pipeline during initial carrier qualifications.

Units conducting detachment training at NAS Key West utilize the Key West Complex airspace, a system of overwater Warning Areas to the south between the Florida Keys and the island of Cuba, to the west beyond the Dry Tortugas, and to the northwest over the Gulf of Mexico. Warning Area 174 (W-174), Warning Area 465 (W-465), the Key West OPAREA, and the Bonefish Air Traffic Control Assigned Airspace (ATCAA) define the Key West Complex airspace. The majority of the airspace is covered by a Tactical Aircrew Combat Training System (TACTS) range that continuously tracks aircraft positions and maneuvering parameters, recording everything for later playback during mission debrief.

U.S. Navy P-3C, P-8A, E-2C and E-2D aircraft also routinely conduct detachment operations at NAS Key West, primarily conducting counternarcotics reconnaissance missions in the Gulf of Mexico and the Caribbean Basin in support of both the U.S. Coast Guard and Joint Interagency Task Force South (JIATF – SOUTH).

In 2019, a 20-year-old Chinese student received a year in prison for photographing the facility.

== Tenant commands ==
- Fighter Squadron Composite 111 (VFC-111) Sun Downers
- Strike Fighter Squadron 106 (VFA-106) Gladiators, Detachment Key West
- Joint Interagency Task Force South
- U.S. Army Special Forces Underwater Operations School (SFUWO)
- U.S. Coast Guard Sector Key West
- Naval Air Warfare Center Aircraft Division (NAWCAD) Atlantic Targets and Marine Operations (ATMO) Detachment Key West

== Facilities ==
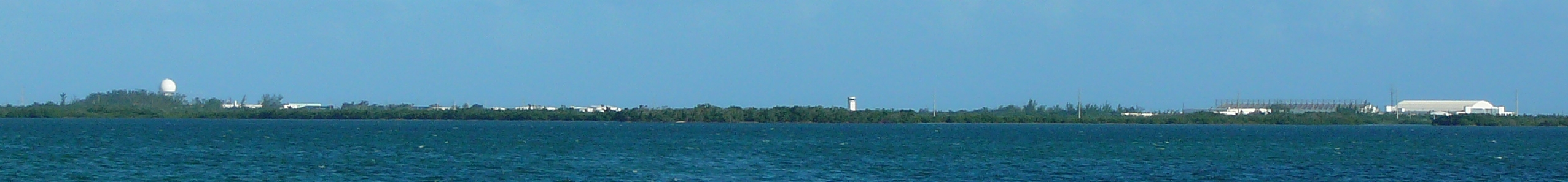
Several structures of the main base of NAS Key West can be seen on Boca Chica Key

NAS Key West's Boca Chica Field has three paved runways:

- Runway 08/26: 10,001 x 200 ft. (3,048 x 61 m), Surface: PEM
- Runway 04/22: 7,002 x 150 ft. (2,134 x 46 m), Surface: PEM
- Runway 14/32: 7,001 x 150 ft. (2,134 x 46 m), Surface: PEM

== Auxiliary annexes ==
In addition to the main air station on Boca Chica Key, NAS Key West comprises several separate annexes in the Key West area. These additional properties include:

- Truman Annex (the former Naval Station Key West surface ship and submarine base until 1974)
- Trumbo Point Annex (the former NAS Key West seaplane base)
- Sigsbee Park Annex
- Naval Branch Health Clinic Key West (site of the former Naval Hospital Key West)

NAS Key West also holds responsibility for several other properties and activities in the Florida Keys. Most military family housing, as well as the Navy Exchange, Commissary, Navy Lodge guest billeting, RV park and other Morale, Welfare and Recreation (MWR) activities are located at Sigsbee Park, a man-made island on the north side of Key West created from dredging of seaplane runways for the NAS Key West seaplane base at Trumbo Point in the 1940s. Family housing is located at both Trumbo Point and the Truman Annex, while single enlisted service members are housed at the main installation at Boca Chica and on Truman Annex. Family housing is managed by Balfour Beatty Communities, a public-private venture (PPV) partner.

Also at Trumbo Point is the Navy Gateway Inns and Suites (NGIS), formerly known as the Bachelor Officers Quarters (BOQ) and later the Combined Bachelor Quarters (CBQ). NGIS accommodates transient government personnel and dependents. Distinguished Visitors (DV) quarters are also available for senior commissioned officers (O-6 through O-10). The CBQ is very visible from North Roosevelt Boulevard and Palm Avenue, with its "FLY NAVY" logo painted prominently on the south side of the building (it is the tallest building on the island of Key West). It is approximately a mile, or a twenty-five-minute walk, from the NGIS to Duval Street downtown.

Truman Annex is the remaining portion of the former Naval Station Key West that closed in 1974 that is still under military control. It has a beach and is the location of Headquarters, Joint Interagency Task Force South (JIATF South). Upon closure of Naval Station Key West, the Fort Zachary Taylor property formerly on the base was turned over to the State of Florida as a Florida State Park and National Historic Site.

Fleming Key is the site of the U.S. Army Special Forces Underwater Operations School. NAS Key West also provides a degree of support for Cudjoe Key Air Force Station, a U.S. Air Force installation located north of Key West on Cudjoe Key, that is home to the Cudjoe Key Tethered Aerostat Radar System

== Accidents and incidents ==
The following notable accidents and incidents have occurred at NAS Key West:

- April 25, 1951: Cubana de Aviación Flight 493, a Douglas DC-4 bound from Miami to Havana, registration CU-T188, collided with a U.S. Navy Beechcraft SNB-1, bureau number 39939, on a practice instrument approach to NAS Key West. Both aircraft plunged into the sea; Navy personnel at the base witnessed the accident and immediately launched rescue and recovery efforts, but all 34 passengers and five crew aboard the DC-4 were killed, along with the pilot-instructor, two student pilots, and radio operator aboard the SNB. The accident occurred at midday, weather was clear with unlimited visibility, and both flights had been cleared to fly under visual flight rules, being expected to "see and avoid" other aircraft; the student flying the SNB was wearing view-limiting goggles, but the other SNB crew were not, and were expected to keep watch. Ground witnesses said that neither aircraft took evasive action prior to the collision, and the Civil Aeronautics Board attributed the accident to the failure of both flight crews to see and avoid conflicting air traffic.

== See also ==
- List of United States Navy airfields
- Coast Guard Station Key West
