= Julián Castro =

Julián Castro may refer to:

- Julian Castro, mayor of San Antonio, Texas, U.S. cabinet member under Barack Obama and candidate for the Democratic nomination for U.S. President in 2020
- Julián Castro (Venezuelan politician), a Venezuelan military officer and President of Venezuela between 1858 and 1859
