= Trumbo Point =

Neighborhood in Key West, Florida, United States

Coordinates: 24.563542°N 81.792794°W

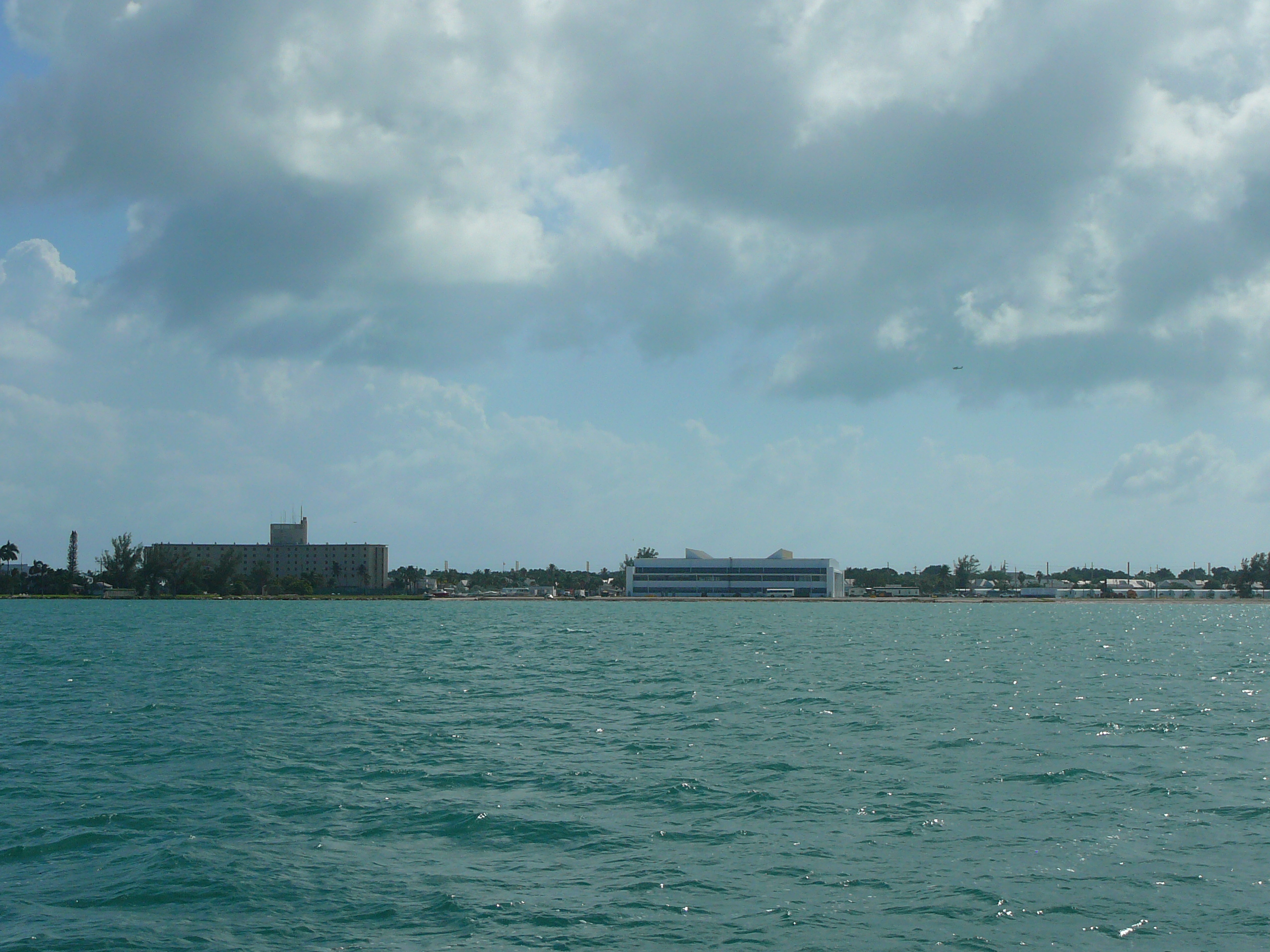
Trumbo Point as seen from the north. The Bachelor Officers Quarters can be seen on the left.

Trumbo Point is a section of the northwest corner of the island of Key West, Florida in the lower Florida Keys. It is one of several bases comprising the Key West Naval Air Station.

Trumbo Point is inaccessible to non-DoD affiliated or non-USCG affiliated civilians without U.S. Navy clearance.

Trumbo Point was a man-made addition to the island of Key West. It was built around 1912 to accommodate a shipping port for the Florida East Coast Railway and was the terminus of the Overseas Railroad. Construction was done by the Trumbo American Dredging Company, with Howard Trumbo serving as the main engineer of the project.

The U.S. Navy acquired Trumbo Point from the Florida East Coast Railway in 1917. The base was originally a Navy seaplane base and was later used by helicopters. The taxi ramps can still be seen descending into the water on the north side of the large, pink concrete pad where hangars were once located.

Today, Trumbo Point is primarily used for military housing and is the site of the former Bachelor Officers Quarters (BOQ), now known as Navy Gateway Inns & Suites. NGIS is the tallest building on the island of Key West, a three-wing highrise. Trumbo Point also contains a restaurant, bar & lounge, vacation rental villas for active and retired military personnel, a pool and water park.

The base can be entered through Trumbo Gate off the intersection of Palm Avenue and Peary Court Road in the civilian sector.

The northernmost portion of Fleming Key (accessible only from Trumbo) is home to the John F. Kennedy Special Warfare School's Underwater Warfare Center, the US Army Special Operations Scuba School.
