= 671st Radar Squadron =

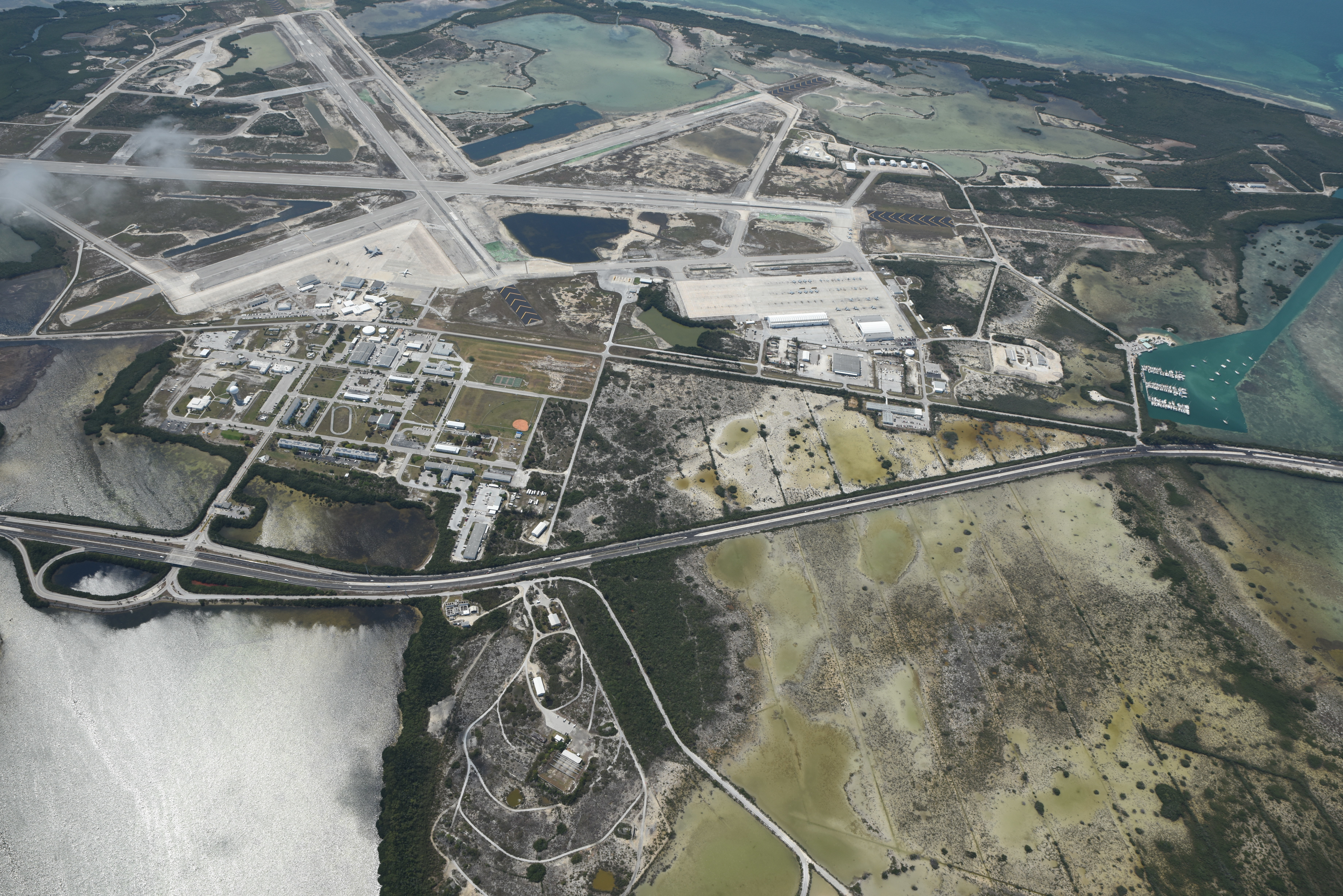
- Aerial view of Naval Air Station Key West
- Active: 1962–1980
- Country: United States
- Branch: United States Air Force
- Role: General Radar Surveillance
- Decorations: Air Force Outstanding Unit Award

Insignia
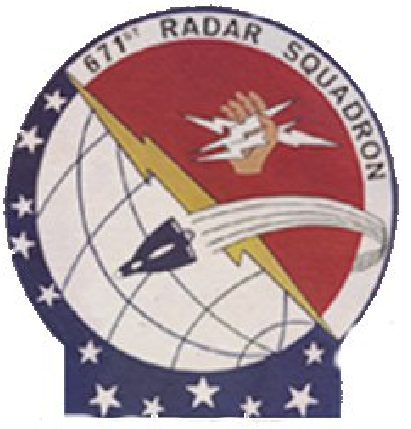
- 671st Aircraft Control & Warning Squadron emblem (Note: Approved 16 February 1963.)

The 671st Radar Squadron is an inactive United States Air Force unit. It was last assigned to the 20th Air Division, Aerospace Defense Command, stationed at Naval Air Station Key West, Florida. It was last active in 1980.

The unit was a General Surveillance Radar squadron providing for the air defense of the United States.

== Lineage ==
671st Radar Squadron

- Constituted as the 671st Aircraft Control and Warning Squadron and activated

Organized on 1 June 1962
Redesignated 671st Radar Squadron (SAGE) on 15 June 1965
Redesignated 671st Radar Squadron on 1 February 1974
Inactivated 30 June 1980

Assignments

- Air Defense Command (not organized)
- Montgomery Air Defense Sector, 1 June 1962
- 32d Air Division, 1 April 1966
- 33d Air Division, 14 November 1969
- 20th Air Division, 19 November 1969 – 30 June 1980

Stations

- Naval Air Station Key West, Florida, 1 June 1962 – 30 June 1980
