= Cudjoe Key, Florida =

- Census-designated place
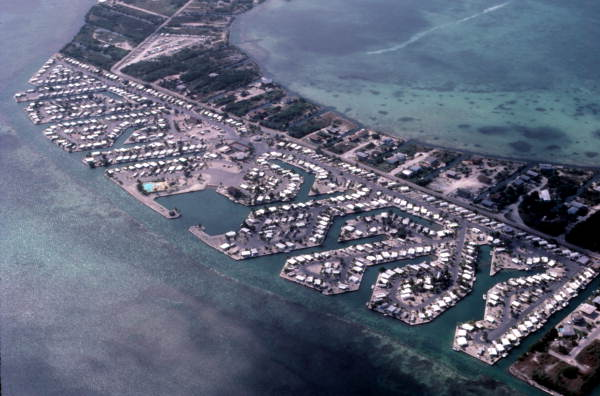
- An aerial view of the Venture Out resort, on the southeast side of Cudjoe Key, in 1983

- Location in Monroe County and the state of Florida

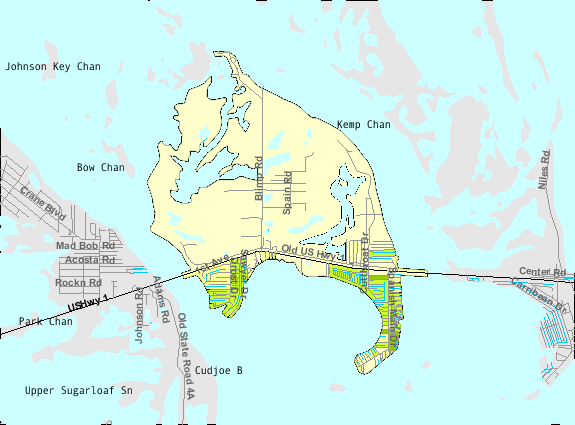
- U.S. Census Bureau map showing CDP boundaries
- Coordinates: 24°40′24″N 81°30′15″W
- Country: United States
- State: Florida
- County: Monroe

Area
  - Total: 10.45 sq mi (27.07 km^{2})
  - Land: 5.17 sq mi (13.40 km^{2})
  - Water: 5.28 sq mi (13.67 km^{2})
- Elevation: 0 ft (0 m)

Population (2020)
  - Total: 2,019
  - Density: 390.2/sq mi (150.66/km^{2})
- Time zone: UTC-5 (Eastern (EST))
  - Summer (DST): UTC-4 (EDT)
- ZIP code: 33042
- Area code: 305
- FIPS code: 12-15862
- GNIS feature ID: 2402389

Cudjoe Key is a census-designated place and unincorporated community in Monroe County, Florida, United States, on an island of the same name in the lower Florida Keys. As of the 2020 census, the CDP had a population of 2,019, up from 1,763 in 2010.

== History ==
=== Toponymy ===
The island was called "Littleton Island" in 1772. The name changed to Cudjoe's by 1849, later shortened to Cudjoe. It may have been named for the Joewood or Cudjoe wood tree (Jacquinia keyensis) which grows on the island. John Viele notes that "Cudjoe" is an Akan name, and may have been the name of an escaped slave who lived on the island early in the 19th century.

=== 20th century ===
The United States Army activated Cudjoe Key Air Force Station in 1959 to track missiles traveling through the Eglin Gulf Test Range. The Air Force took over operations the following year, and it subsequently became a detached installation of Homestead Joint Air Reserve Base.

=== 21st century ===
The air force station flies a white radar aerostat, known locally as "Fat Albert", which is used for drug interdiction missions by the Drug Enforcement Administration. On April 20, 2007, a Cessna 182 crashed after its left wing struck the tether anchoring "Fat Albert". The aerostat is marked on air navigation charts inside a restricted area that contains the warning, "Caution: Unmarked balloon on cable to 14,000 [feet]."

On September 10, 2017, Cudjoe Key suffered a direct hit from Hurricane Irma which made landfall as a Category 4 hurricane.

== Geography ==
Cudjoe Key is located in the Florida Keys. U.S. 1 (or the Overseas Highway) crosses the key at about mile markers 20.5 – 23, between Summerland and Sugarloaf Keys. The highway leads west-southwest 20 miles (32 km) to Key West, east 30 miles (48 km) to Marathon, and a total of 136 miles (219 km) northeast to Miami.

According to the United States Census Bureau, the CDP has a total area of 10.5 square miles (27 km^{2}), of which 5.2 square miles (13 km^{2}) are land and 5.3 square miles (14 km^{2}), or 50.5%, are water. The water area includes Cudjoe Bay to the south of the island, a portion of Kemp Channel to the east, and tidal water to the northwest between Cudjoe Key and small islands known as the Rattlesnake Lumps.

== Demographics ==
Historical population
Census	Pop.	Note	%±
1990	1,714		—
2000	1,695		−1.1%
2010	1,763		4.0%
2020	2,019		14.5%
U.S. Decennial Census

=== 2020 census ===
As of the 2020 census, Cudjoe Key had a population of 2,019. The median age was 56.7 years. 11.7% of residents were under the age of 18 and 30.7% of residents were 65 years of age or older. For every 100 females there were 113.2 males, and for every 100 females age 18 and over there were 113.9 males age 18 and over.

93.0% of residents lived in urban areas, while 7.0% lived in rural areas.

There were 936 households in Cudjoe Key, of which 15.4% had children under the age of 18 living in them. Of all households, 57.4% were married-couple households, 19.1% were households with a male householder and no spouse or partner present, and 14.9% were households with a female householder and no spouse or partner present. About 25.3% of all households were made up of individuals and 12.8% had someone living alone who was 65 years of age or older.

There were 1,627 housing units, of which 42.5% were vacant. The homeowner vacancy rate was 2.3% and the rental vacancy rate was 35.6%.

Racial composition as of the 2020 census
Race	Number	Percent
White	1,758	87.1%
Black or African American	24	1.2%
American Indian and Alaska Native	8	0.4%
Asian	19	0.9%
Native Hawaiian and Other Pacific Islander	6	0.3%
Some other race	48	2.4%
Two or more races	156	7.7%
Hispanic or Latino (of any race)	193	9.6%

=== 2000 census ===
As of the 2000 census, there were 1,695 people, 799 households, and 541 families residing in the CDP. The population density was 124.9 people/km^{2} (323 people/mi^{2}). There were 1,482 housing units at an average density of 109.2 units/km^{2} (283 units/mi^{2}). The racial makeup of the CDP was 96.22% White, 0.88% African American, 0.47% Native American, 0.88% Asian, 0.12% Pacific Islander, 0.71% from other races, and 0.71% from two or more races. Hispanic or Latino of any race were 5.66% of the population.

There were 799 households, out of which 15.6% had children under the age of 18 living with them, 62.0% were married couples living together, 3.4% had a female householder with no husband present, and 32.2% were non-families. 21.7% of all households were made up of individuals, and 7.8% had someone living alone who was 65 years of age or older. The average household size was 2.12 and the average family size was 2.43.

In the CDP, the population was spread out, with 12.2% under the age of 18, 3.7% from 18 to 24, 27.1% from 25 to 44, 38.8% from 45 to 64, and 18.2% who were 65 years of age or older. The median age was 48 years. For every 100 females, there were 108.2 males. For every 100 females age 18 and over, there were 109.4 males.

The median income for a household in the CDP was $57,500, and the median income for a family was $59,883. Males had a median income of $36,094 versus $31,250 for females. The per capita income for the CDP was $27,085. About 4.4% of families and 5.8% of the population were below the poverty line, including 5.7% of those under age 18 and 5.4% of those age 65 or over.
