= VFC-111 =

Fighter Squadron Composite 111
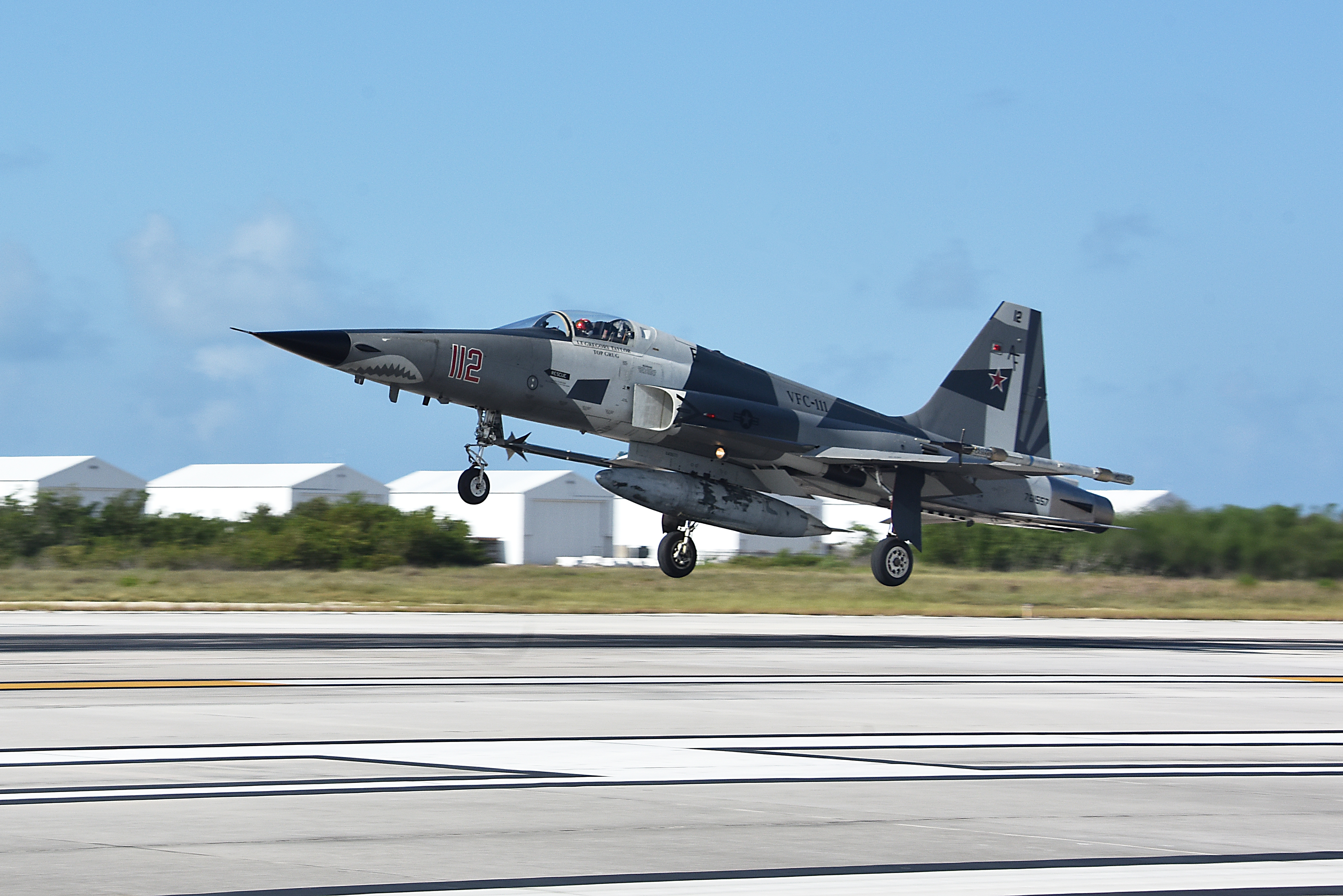
- A squadron F-5N Tiger II at NAS Key West in 2020
- Active: 1 November 2006 – present
- Country: United States
- Branch: United States Navy
- Type: Adversary Squadron
- Part of: United States Navy Reserve: Naval Air Force Reserve; Tactical Support Wing
- Garrison/HQ: Naval Air Station Key West
- Nickname: "Sun Downers"
- Mottos: Semper Confidens, Numquam Elatus (Latin: "Always Confident, Never Arrogant")
- Mascot: Omar

Insignia
- VFC-111 insignia

Aircraft flown
- Fighter: F-5N/F Tiger II

Fighter Squadron Composite 111 (VFC-111), also known as the "Sun Downers", is a United States Navy Reserve adversary squadron based at Naval Air Station Key West, Florida. Currently, it operates Northrop F-5N/F Tiger-IIs, of which most are single-seater F-5Ns and one twin-seater F-5F, the "FrankenTiger".

The squadron is composed of active duty junior officers, full-time active duty Training and Administration of the Reserve (TAR) personnel, and mid-grade part-time Selected Reservists (SELRES), with the SELRES pilots having past active duty experience in Navy strike fighter squadrons. This gives the squadron experience, as well as leveraging that experience by retaining instructor fighter pilots that have left active service but transitioned to the Navy Reserve.

== History ==
VFC-111 was originally known as Fighter Composite Squadron 13 (VFC-13) Detachment Key West, which was established in January 2006. VFC-13 Det Key West was redesignated as VFC-111 in November 2006.

VFC-111 assumed its 'Sun Downer' insignia, callsign, and traditions from the Fighter Squadron One Eleven (VF-111) Sun Downers, a famous U.S. Navy fighter squadron with extensive combat history as a carrier-based F-8 Crusader and F-4 Phantom II squadron during the Vietnam War and as an F-4 and F-14 Tomcat squadron during the latter part of the Cold War, as well as Operation Restore Hope and Operation Southern Watch. VF-111 was disestablished as a fleet squadron at then-NAS Miramar, California in 1995 due to post-Cold War force reductions. Officially, in contrast with the U.S. Air Force, the U.S. Navy does not recognize a direct lineage with disestablished squadrons. However, unofficially, the Naval Aviation community strives to retain traditions and history whenever a squadron designation and name is resurrected in a new unit.

== Mission ==
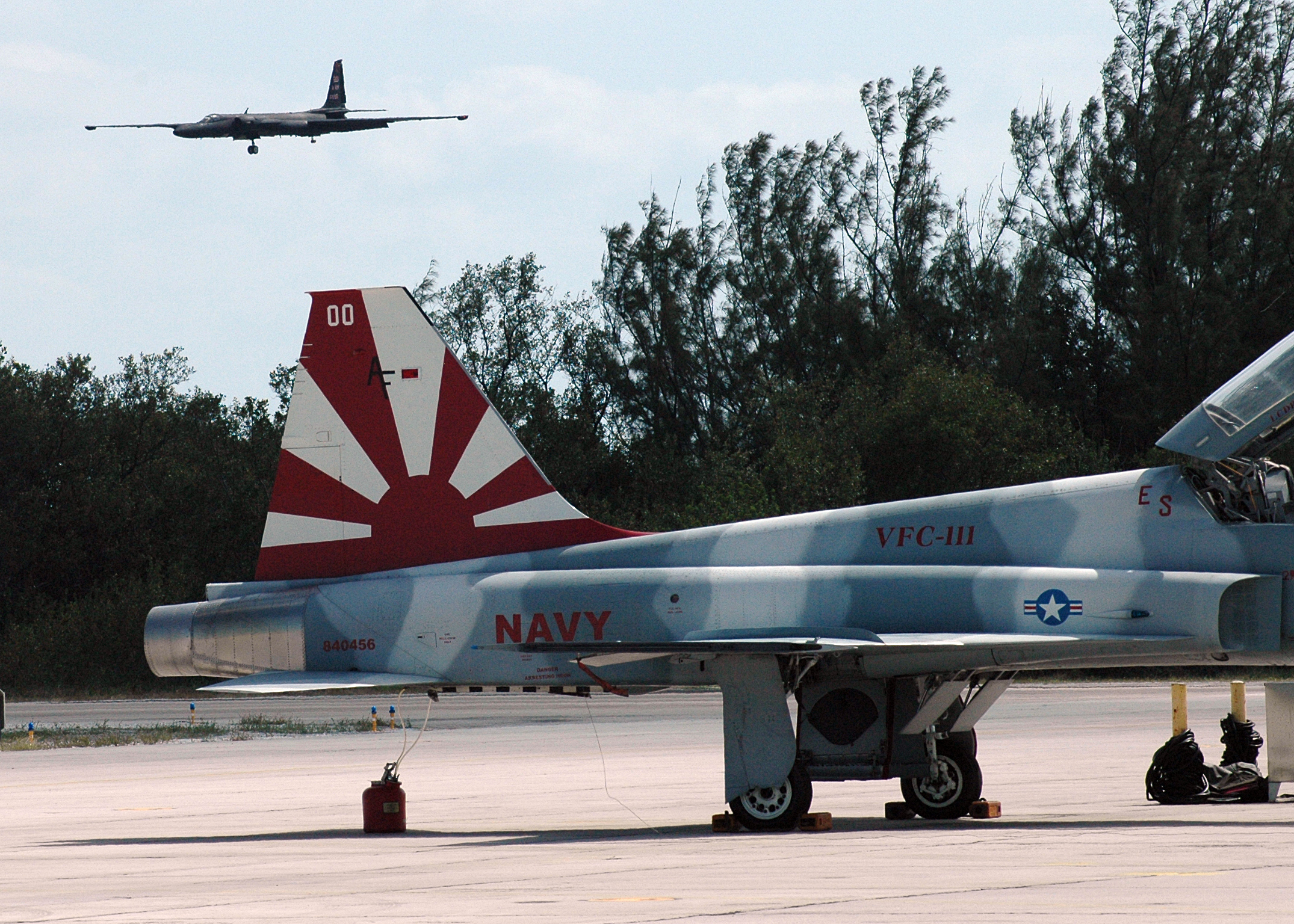
VFC-111 F-5F at NAS Key West with a USAF U-2S landing in the background, 2008

VFC-111 operates as part of the U.S. Navy Reserve's fleet adversary program, providing dissimilar air combat training (DACT) to fleet strike fighter and Marine fighter attack squadrons, as well as U.S. Air Force, Air Force Reserve and Air National Guard fighter squadrons.

Ostensibly assigned to the Navy Reserve's Tactical Support Wing, VFC-111 is actually an Active-Reserve Integration (ARI) unit composed of both Regular Navy and Navy Reserve personnel. In this capacity, it has assumed the adversary role of a since deactivated active duty squadron at NAS Key West known as Fighter Squadron 45 (VF-45).

VFC-111's location at NAS Key West, Florida, home of the Navy's Strike Fighter Air Readiness Program (SFARP), eliminates the need for costly adversary detachments and provides an on-site resource for carrier air wings conducting SFARP training at NAS Key West and on the adjacent Key West Tactical Air Combat Training System (TACTS) Range.

VFC-111 also provides a significant portion of adversary support to all F/A-18 Fleet Replacement Squadrons (FRS) in the Navy and Marine Corps, i.e., VFA-106 at NAS Oceana, Virginia; VFA-122 at NAS Lemoore, California. VFC-111 has also commenced support to VAQ-129, the FRS for the EA-18G Growler at NAS Whidbey Island, Washington, as well as the Navy and Marine Corps F-35C Fleet Replacement Squadron, VFA-125 at NAS Lemoore, California, and the Marine Corps' F-35B Fleet Replacement Squadron, VMFAT-501 at MCAS Beaufort, South Carolina.

== See also ==
- History of the United States Navy
- List of United States Navy aircraft squadrons
- List of Inactive United States Navy aircraft squadrons
