= RVAH-9 =

Reconnaissance Attack (Heavy) Squadron 9
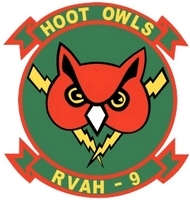
- RVAH-9 squadron patch
- Active: 15 January 1953 – 30 September 1977
- Country: United States
- Branch: United States Navy
- Role: Photo-reconnaissance
- Part of: Inactive
- Nickname(s): Hoot Owls
- Engagements: Vietnam War

RVAH-9 was a Reconnaissance Attack (Heavy) Squadron of the U.S. Navy. Originally established as Composite Squadron Nine (VC-9) on 15 January 1953, it was redesignated as Heavy Attack Squadron Nine (VAH-9) on 1 November 1955 and was redesignated as Reconnaissance Attack (Heavy) Squadron Nine (RVAH-9) on 3 June 1964. The squadron was disestablished on 30 September 1977.

== Operational history ==
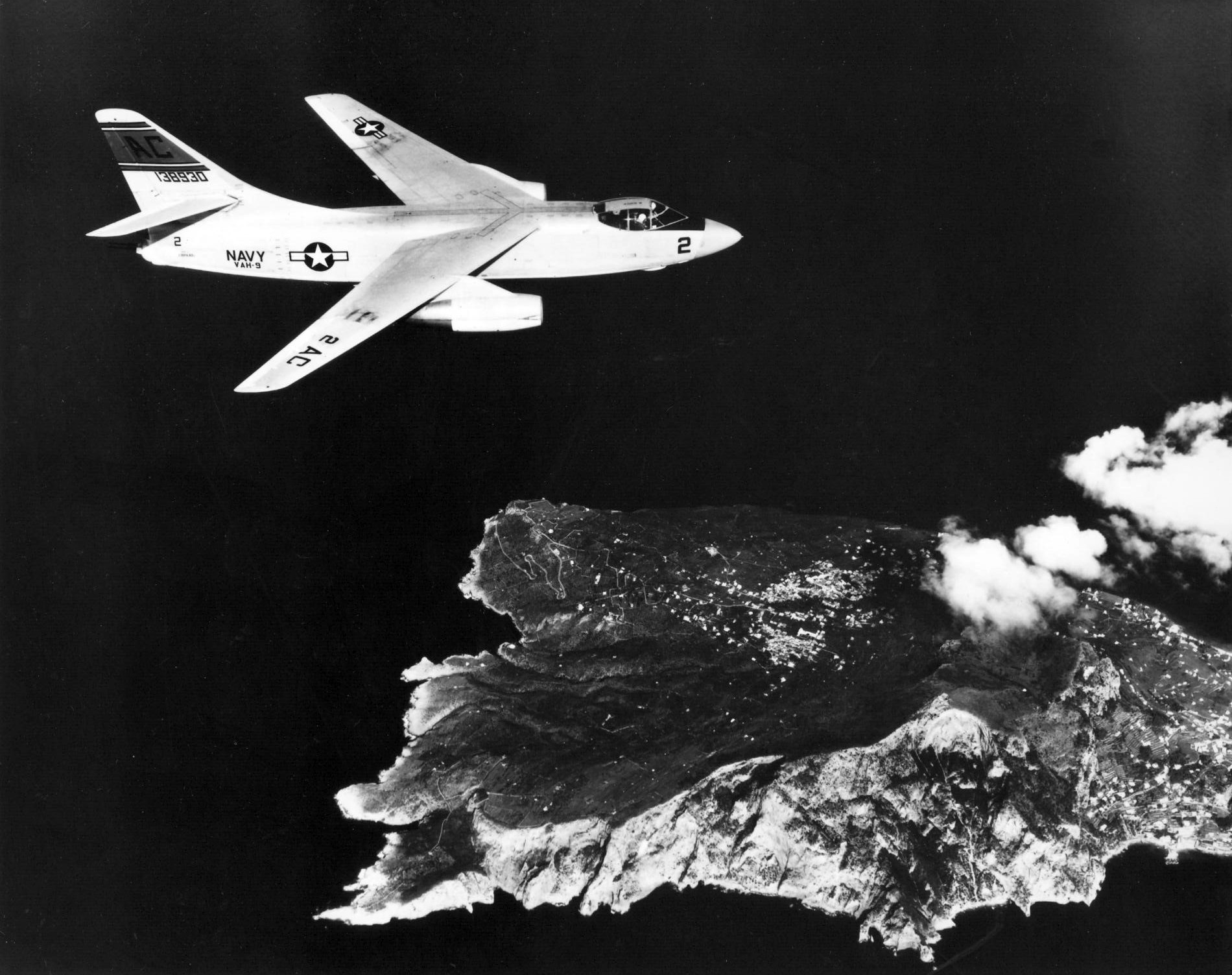
VAH-9 A3D-2 Skywarrior flies over Capri in 1958

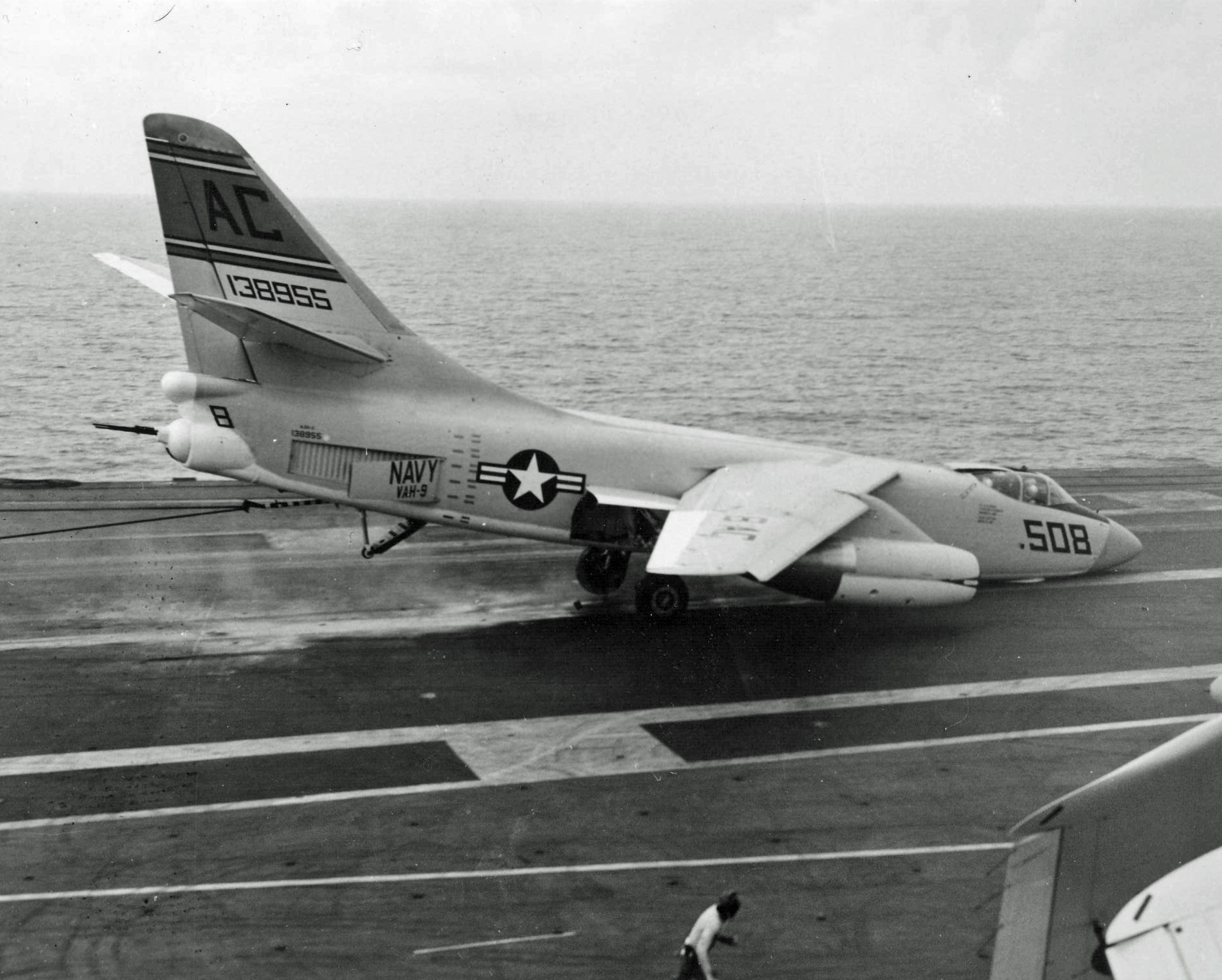
VAH-9 A3D-2 suffers a nosewheel collapse on USS Saratoga c.1959

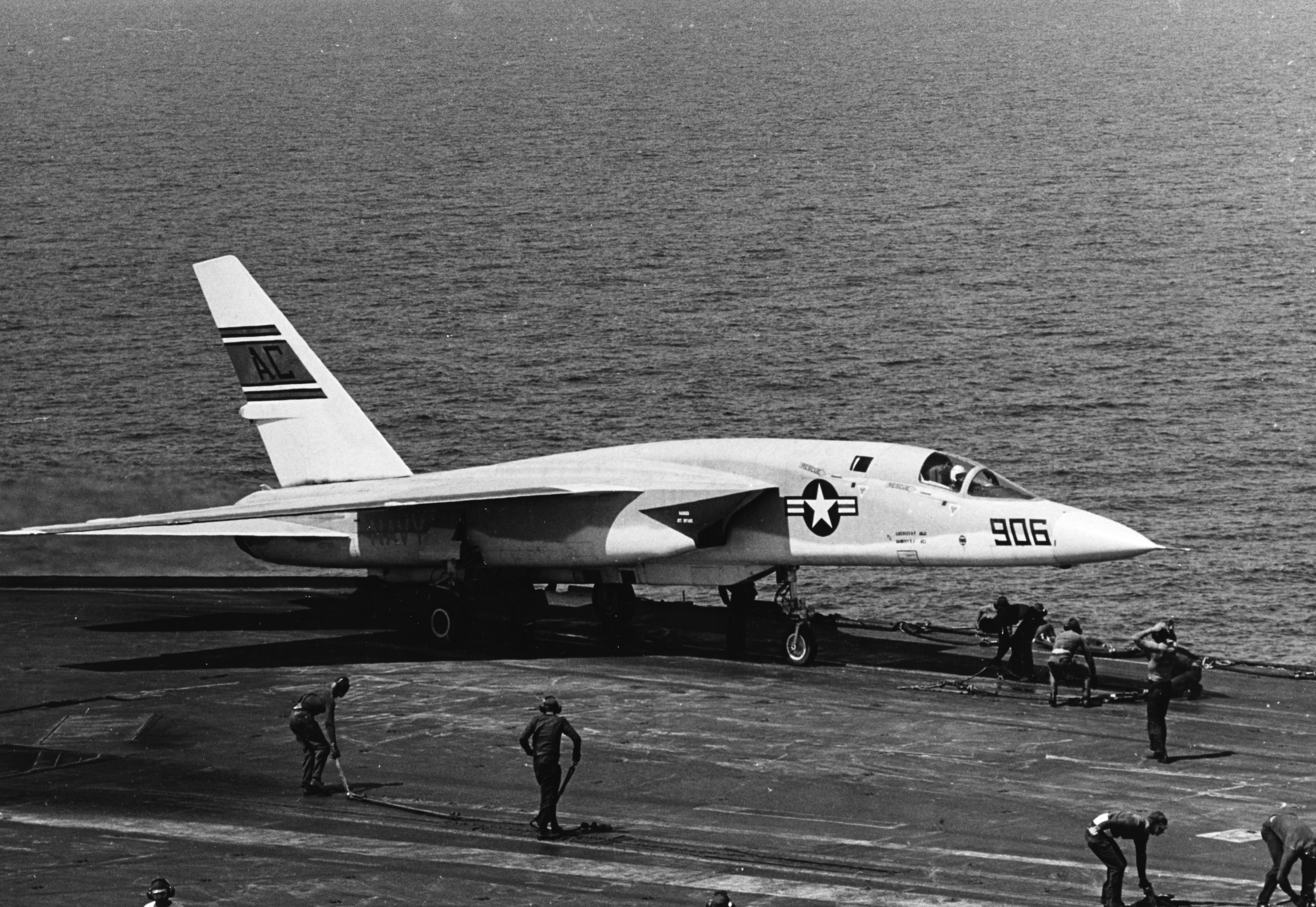
RVAH-9 RA-5C Vigilante prepares to launch from USS Ranger in 1966

=== VC-9 ===
VC-9 was established at Naval Auxiliary Air Station Sanford, Florida in January 1953 and was initially equipped with the AJ-2 Savage, receiving its first aircraft in June 1953. In 1953, while operating from the USS Midway, VC-9 conducted the Navy's first inflight refueling operations.

In preparation for the arrival of the A3D Skywarrior heavy attack jet aircraft as the designated airframe to replace the AJ Savage in the carrier-based nuclear strike role, NAAS Sanford was subject to significant improvements during the mid and late 1950s in order to upgrade the installation to full naval air station status as a Master Jet Base. Following completion of these improvements, the base was renamed Naval Air Station Sanford.

Also in preparation for the arrival of the A3D, VC-9 was redesignated as VAH-9 on 1 November 1955, receiving its first Skywarriors 14 months later in early 1957.

=== VAH-9 ===
VAH-9 reequipped with the A3D-2 Skywarrior in early 1957 and flew the A3D-2 for eight years thereafter, making several Mediterranean deployments aboard USS Saratoga. In September 1962, with the implementation of a common aircraft designation system throughout the Department of Defense, the A3D-2 was redesignated as the A-3B Skywarrior.

The intended follow-on aircraft to the subsonic A-3 Skywarrior in the heavy attack role was the Mach 2+ A-5 Vigilante in its A-5A and A-5B variants. As the submarine-launched ballistic missile became the primary Navy strategic deterrent, the Navy concluded that it no longer needed carrier-based strategic bombers and that Naval Aviation's strike arm would remain strictly a tactical force. Having been designed as a supersonic nuclear strike bomber, aircraft such as the A-5A and A-5B no longer had a mission, and in 1963, the Navy decided to halt any further procurement of the A-5A and the follow-on A-5B. However, in lieu of prematurely retiring the Vigilante, it was deemed that it would be reconfigured as a dedicated reconnaissance platform under the designation RA-5C.

VAH-9's transition to the RA-5C Vigilante began in April 1964. The unit's designation was changed to RVAH-9 in June of that year and the last A-3B was transferred out on 4 August 1964.

=== RVAH-9 / Vietnam / Cold War ===
- On 14 November 1964, RA-5C BuNo 149308 assigned to RVAH-9 crashed at Naval Air Station Sanford. Both crewmen, Lieutenant Commander Smith and ADJC Carolyers, were safely ejected.
- 28 November 1964 – 12 July 1965, RVAH-9 embarked aboard USS Saratoga for a Mediterranean deployment.
- 10 December 1965 – 25 August 1966, following less than five months turnaround time at NAS Sanford, RVAH-9 embarked aboard USS Ranger for a Western Pacific (WESTPAC) and Vietnam deployment.
  - 16 January 1966, RA-5C BuNo 149312 failed to catch the arresting wire while landing aboard Ranger. The pilot, Lieutenant Commander Charles Schoonover, applied power, but the starboard engine subsequently exploded and the aircraft crashed into the sea. Both Lieutenant Commander Schoonover and his reconnaissance attack navigator, Ensign Hal Hollingsworth, were listed as killed in action, bodies not recovered.
- 2 May 1967 – 6 December 1967, RVAH-9 embarked aboard USS Saratoga for a Mediterranean deployment.
  - Budgetary pressures of the Vietnam War forces the Department of Defense to close several stateside air bases, to include Naval Air Station Sanford. Following their return from their 1967 deployment and prior to departure on their 1968-1969 deployment, RVAH-9 shifts home stations from Naval Air Station Sanford to the former Turner Air Force Base, renamed Naval Air Station Albany, Georgia.
- 26 October 1968 – 17 May 1969, RVAH-9 embarked aboard USS Ranger for a Western Pacific and Vietnam deployment.
- 17 June 1970 – 11 November 1970, RVAH-9 embarked aboard USS Saratoga for a Mediterranean deployment.
- 7 June 1971 – 31 October 1971, RVAH-9 embarked aboard USS Saratoga for a Mediterranean deployment.
- 22 September 1972 – 6 July 1973, RVAH-9 embarked aboard USS Forrestal for a Mediterranean deployment.

=== RVAH-9 / Cold War ===
- 19 July 1974 – 21 January 1975, RVAH-9 embarked aboard USS Independence for a Mediterranean deployment.
  - Budgetary pressures following the end of the Vietnam War force the Department of Defense to close several stateside air bases again, to include Naval Air Station Albany. In January 1974, RVAH-9 shifts its home station from NAS Albany to Naval Air Station Key West, Florida.
- 16 July 1975 – 24 Sep 1975, following less than five months turnaround time at their home station of Naval Air Station Key West, RVAH-9 embarked aboard the newly commissioned nuclear-powered aircraft carrier USS Nimitz for a two-month Northern Atlantic deployment as part of the carrier's post-shakedown availability.
- 7 July 1976 – 7 February 1977, RVAH-9 embarked aboard USS Nimitz for a Mediterranean deployment.

Attrition of airframes and the increasing maintenance and flight hour costs of the RA-5C in a constrained defense budget environment forced the Navy to incrementally retire the RA-5C and sunset the RVAH community beginning in mid-1974. Carrier-based reconnaissance was concurrently conducted by the active duty VFP community at Naval Air Station Miramar and the Naval Reserve VFP community at Andrews Air Force Base / NAF Washington with the RF-8G Crusader until 29 March 1987, when the last RF-8G was retired and the mission was fully transferred to the active duty and Naval Reserve VF community at Naval Air Station Miramar, Naval Air Station Oceana, Naval Air Station Dallas and NAS JRB Fort Worth as a secondary role with the F-14 Tomcat equipped with the Tactical Air Reconnaissance Pod System (TARPS).

Following its return from its final Mediterranean deployment in early 1977, RVAH-9 was inactivated at Naval Air Station Key West on 30 September 1977 following over 24 1/2 years of active service.

== Home station assignments ==
The squadron was assigned to these home stations:

- Naval Air Auxiliary Station Sanford / Naval Air Station Sanford, Florida
- Naval Air Station Albany, Georgia
- Naval Air Station Key West, Florida

== Aircraft assignment ==
- AJ-2 Savage
- A3D-2 / A-3B Skywarrior
- RA-5C Vigilante

== See also ==
- Reconnaissance aircraft
- List of inactive United States Navy aircraft squadrons
- History of the United States Navy
