= RVAH-1 =

Reconnaissance Attack (Heavy) Squadron 1
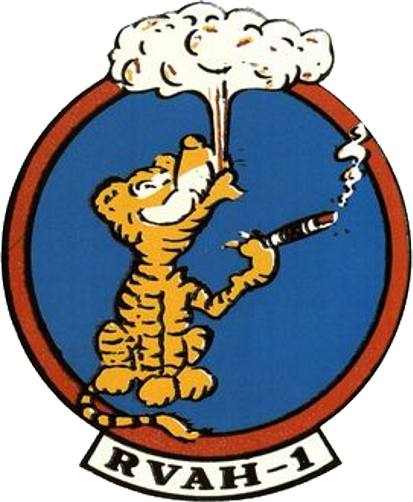
- RVAH-1 squadron patch
- Active: 1 November 1955 – 29 January 1979
- Country: United States
- Branch: United States Navy
- Role: Photo-reconnaissance
- Part of: Inactive
- Nickname(s): Smokin' Tigers
- Engagements: Vietnam War

RVAH-1 was a Reconnaissance Attack (Heavy) Squadron of the U.S. Navy. Originally established as Heavy Attack Squadron One (VAH-1) on 1 November 1955, it was redesignated as Reconnaissance Attack (Heavy) Squadron One (RVAH-1) on 1 September 1964. The squadron was disestablished on 29 January 1979.

== Operational history ==
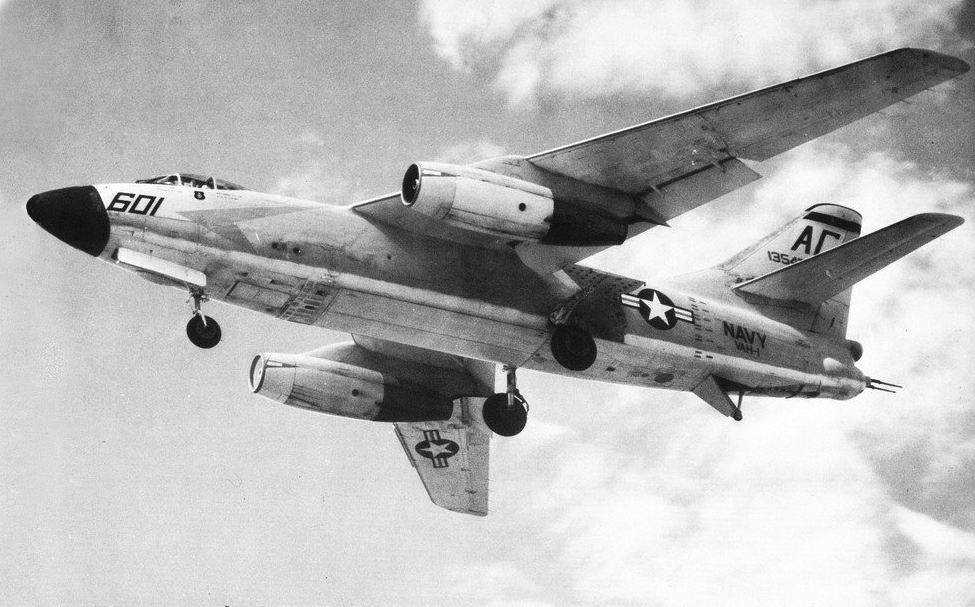
VAH-1 A3D-2 Skywarrior in flight in 1959

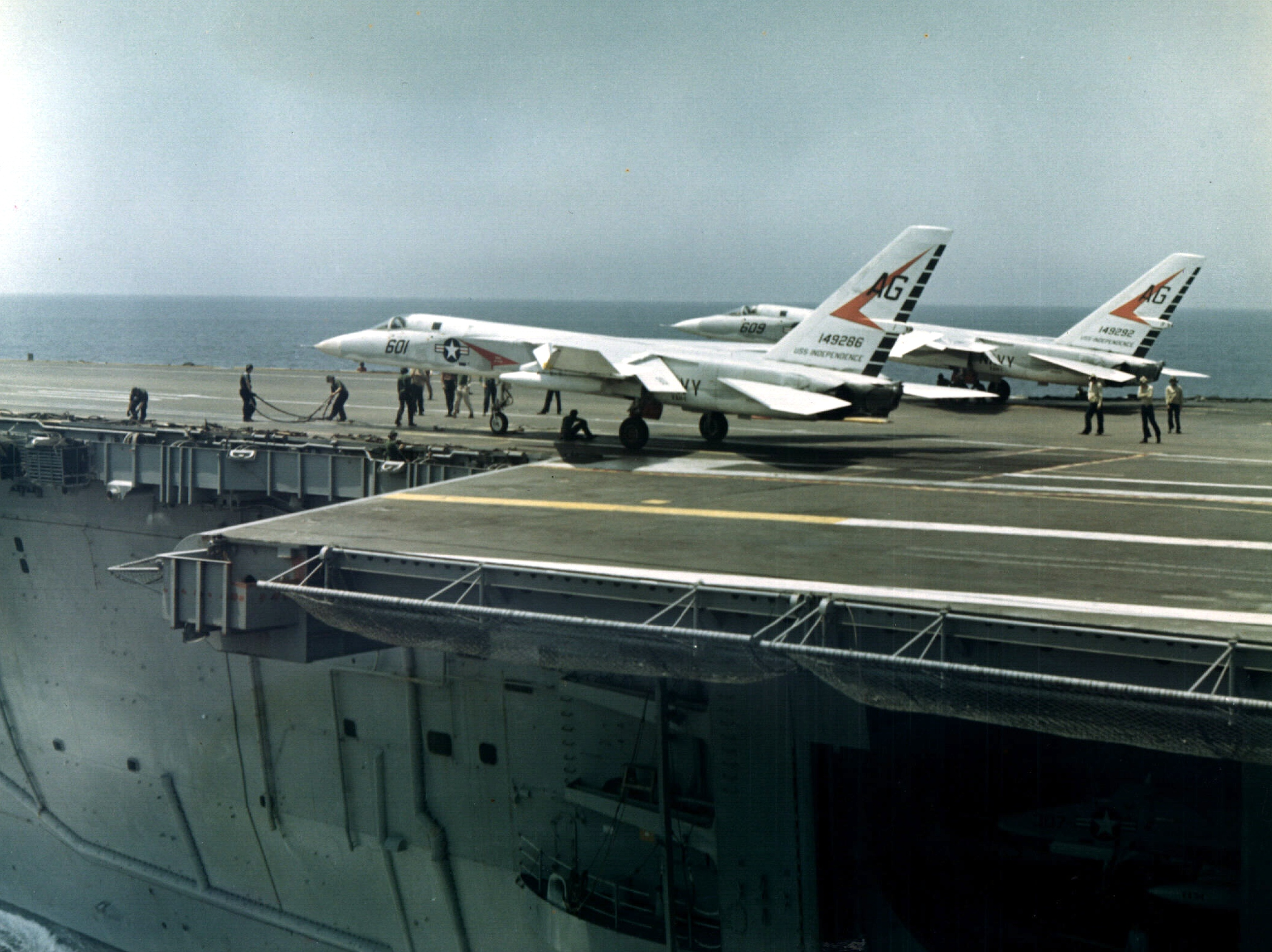
A pair of VAH-1 A-5A Vigilantes being readied for launch from the bow catapults of USS Saratoga (CVA-60), c.1964

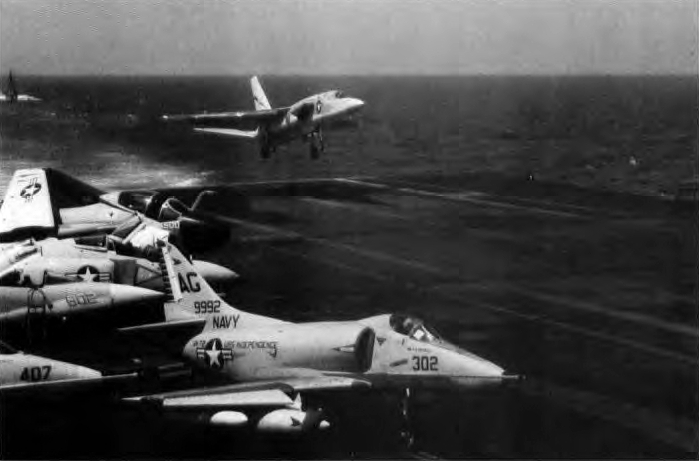
RVAH-1 RA-5C Vigilante lands on USS Independence (CVA-62) off Vietnam in 1965

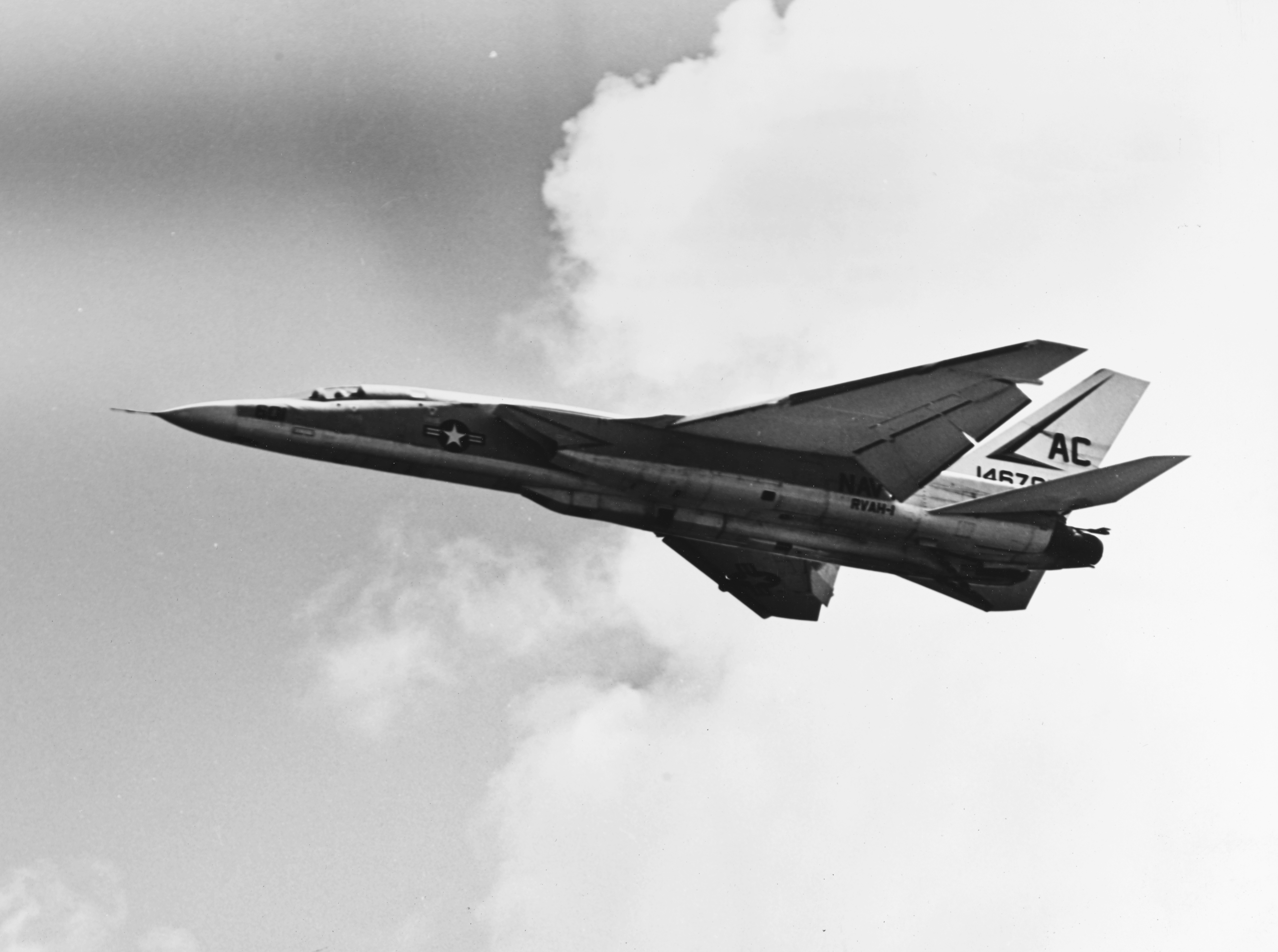
RVAH-1 RA-5C in 1969

=== VAH-1 ===
Established at Naval Air Station Jacksonville, Florida on 1 November 1955 as the heir to Patrol Squadron THREE (VP-3), VAH-1 became the first unit to operate the A3D Skywarrior, receiving their first five A3D-1s on 31 March 1956. In early November 1956, VAH-1's A3D-1s were craned aboard the USS Forrestal (CVA-59) at Naval Station Mayport, Florida and the Forrestal put to sea to operate in the eastern Atlantic during the Suez Crisis, ready to enter the Mediterranean Sea should it be necessary. Carrier qualifications with the A3D-1 were conducted during this period and Forrestal returned to the US on 12 December 1956. In January 1957, VAH-1 embarked on Forrestal on its first formal deployment, a cruise to the Mediterranean.

In 1958, VAH-1 upgraded to the A3D-2 version of the Skywarrior and, in January 1959, relocated to Naval Air Station Sanford, Florida. VAH-1 continued to operate the Skywarrior until late 1962, at which point the squadron ceased operating the now renamed A-3B and began preparations for transitioning to the A-5A Vigilante, completing transition in January 1963. The squadron made one overseas deployment with the A-5A and continued to operate the aircraft until mid-1964, at which point it began transitioning to the RA-5C Vigilante. This transition was completed in August 1964 and the squadron was redesignated as RVAH-1 on 1 September 1964.

- 2 September 1958 – 12 March 1958, VAH-1 was embarked aboard USS Randolph for a Mediterranean deployment.
- 4 August 1960 – 3 March 1961, VAH-1 was embarked aboard USS Independence for a Mediterranean deployment.
- 4 August 1961 – 19 December 1961, VAH-1 was embarked aboard USS Independence for a Mediterranean deployment.
- 19 April 1962 – 27 August 1962, VAH-1 was embarked aboard USS Independence for a Mediterranean deployment.
- 6 August 1963 – 4 March 1964, VAH-1 was embarked aboard USS Independence for a Mediterranean deployment.

=== RVAH-1 / Cold War & Vietnam ===
- VAH-1 was redesignated as RVAH-1 on 1 September 1964.
  - On 3 September 1964, shortly following the squadron's redesignation as RVAH-1, an RA-5C, BuNo 151616, assigned to RVAH-1 suffered complete hydraulic failure and crashed at Naval Air Station Sanford. Both of the jet's crewmen, Lieutenant Commander James Bell and AMHC Pemberton, safely ejected.
- 10 May 1965 – 13 December 1965, RVAH-1 was embarked aboard USS Independence for a Western Pacific (WESTPAC) and Vietnam deployment.
  - On 16 October 1965, RA-5C BuNo 151615 was lost in combat. Both crewmen, LCDR James Bell and LCDR James Hutton, ejected successfully, were captured, and held as POWs in North Vietnam until repatriated to the United States on 12 February 1973.
- 3 January 1968 – 18 July 1968, RVAH-1 was embarked aboard USS Enterprise for a WESTPAC and Vietnam deployment.
  - On 5 May 1968, RA-5C BuNo 149278 was lost in combat. Both crewmen, Lieutenant Giles Norrington and Lieutenant Richard Tangeman ejected successfully, were captured, and held as POWs in North Vietnam until repatriated to the United States on 14 March 1973.
  - Budgetary pressures of the Vietnam War force the Department of Defense to close several stateside air force bases and naval air stations, to include Naval Air Station Sanford, Florida. Upon return from their 1968 deployment, RVAH-1 shifts home stations from NAS Sanford to the former Turner Air Force Base, renamed Naval Air Station Albany, Georgia (Turner Field).
- 9 July 1969 – 22 Jan 1970, RVAH-1 was embarked aboard USS Saratoga for a Mediterranean deployment.
- 27 October 1970 – 17 July 1971, RVAH-1 was embarked aboard USS Ranger for a WESTPAC and Vietnam deployment.
- 11 April 1972 – 13 February 1973, RVAH-1 was embarked aboard USS Saratoga for a WESTPAC and Vietnam deployment. This was the squadron's final Vietnam deployment.
  - On 7 June 1972, RA-5C BuNo 156616 was struck by an SA-2 Guideline surface-to-air missile in combat near Haiphong, North Vietnam. Both crewmen ejected successfully and were rescued.

=== RVAH-1 / Cold War ===
- 3 January-3 August 1974, RVAH-1 was embarked aboard USS America for an Atlantic and Mediterranean deployment.
- 6 September-12 October 1974, RVAH-1 was embarked aboard USS America for NATO Exercise Northern Merger.
  - Budgetary pressures following the end of the Vietnam War force the Department of Defense to again close several stateside air force bases and naval air stations, to include Naval Air Station Albany, Georgia. In late 1974, RVAH-1 shifts home stations from Naval Air Station Albany to Naval Air Station Key West, Florida (Boca Chica Field).
- 7 April-12 May 1975, RVAH-1 was embarked aboard USS John F. Kennedy for operations in the Western Atlantic and Caribbean.
- 28 June 1975 – 27 Jan 1976, RVAH-1 was embarked aboard USS John F. Kennedy for an Atlantic and Mediterranean deployment.
- 30 July 1976 – 28 Mar 1977, following a 6-month post-deployment at home turnaround, RVAH-1 was embarked aboard USS Enterprise for a Western Pacific and Indian Ocean deployment.
- 4 April-30 October 1978, RVAH-1 was embarked aboard USS Enterprise for a Western Pacific deployment.

Attrition of airframes and the increasing maintenance and flight hour costs of the RA-5C in a constrained post-Vietnam defense budget environment forced the Navy to incrementally retire the RA-5C and sunset the RVAH community beginning in mid-1974. In tandem with the RVAH community, carrier-based reconnaissance had been concurrently conducted by the active duty light photographic reconnaissance (VFP) community at Naval Air Station Miramar and the Naval Reserve VFP community at Andrews AFB / NAF Washington with the RF-8G Crusader, continuing until 29 March 1987 when the last RF-8G was retired and the mission fully transferred to the active duty and Naval Reserve fighter (VF) community at Naval Air Station Miramar, Naval Air Station Oceana, Naval Air Station Dallas and later Naval Air Station JRB Fort Worth as a secondary role with the F-14 Tomcat equipped with the Tactical Air Reconnaissance Pod System (TARPS) and later the Digital TARPS (D-TARPS).

Following its return from its final Western Pacific deployment in late 1978, RVAH-1 was inactivated at Naval Air Station Key West on 19 January 1979 following nearly 24 years of active service.

== Home station assignments ==
The squadron was assigned to these home stations:

- Naval Air Station Jacksonville, Florida
- Naval Air Station Sanford, Florida
- Naval Air Station Albany, Georgia
- Naval Air Station Key West, Florida

== Aircraft assignment ==
- A-3A (A3D-1) and A-3B (A3D-2) Skywarrior
- A-5A Vigilante
- RA-5C Vigilante

== See also ==
- Reconnaissance aircraft
- List of inactive United States Navy aircraft squadrons
- History of the United States Navy
