= RVAH-3 =

Reconnaissance Attack (Heavy) Squadron 3
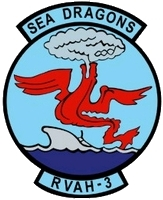
- RVAH-3 squadron patch
- Active: 15 June 1956 – 17 August 1979
- Country: United States
- Branch: United States Navy
- Role: Photo-reconnaissance
- Part of: Inactive
- Nickname: Sea Dragons

RVAH-3 was a Reconnaissance Attack (Heavy) Squadron of the U.S. Navy that served as the Fleet Replacement Squadron (FRS) for the RVAH community. Originally established as Heavy Attack Squadron Three (VAH-3) on 15 June 1956, it was redesignated as Reconnaissance Attack (Heavy) Squadron Three (RVAH-3) on 1 July 1964. The squadron was disestablished on 17 August 1979.

== Operational history ==
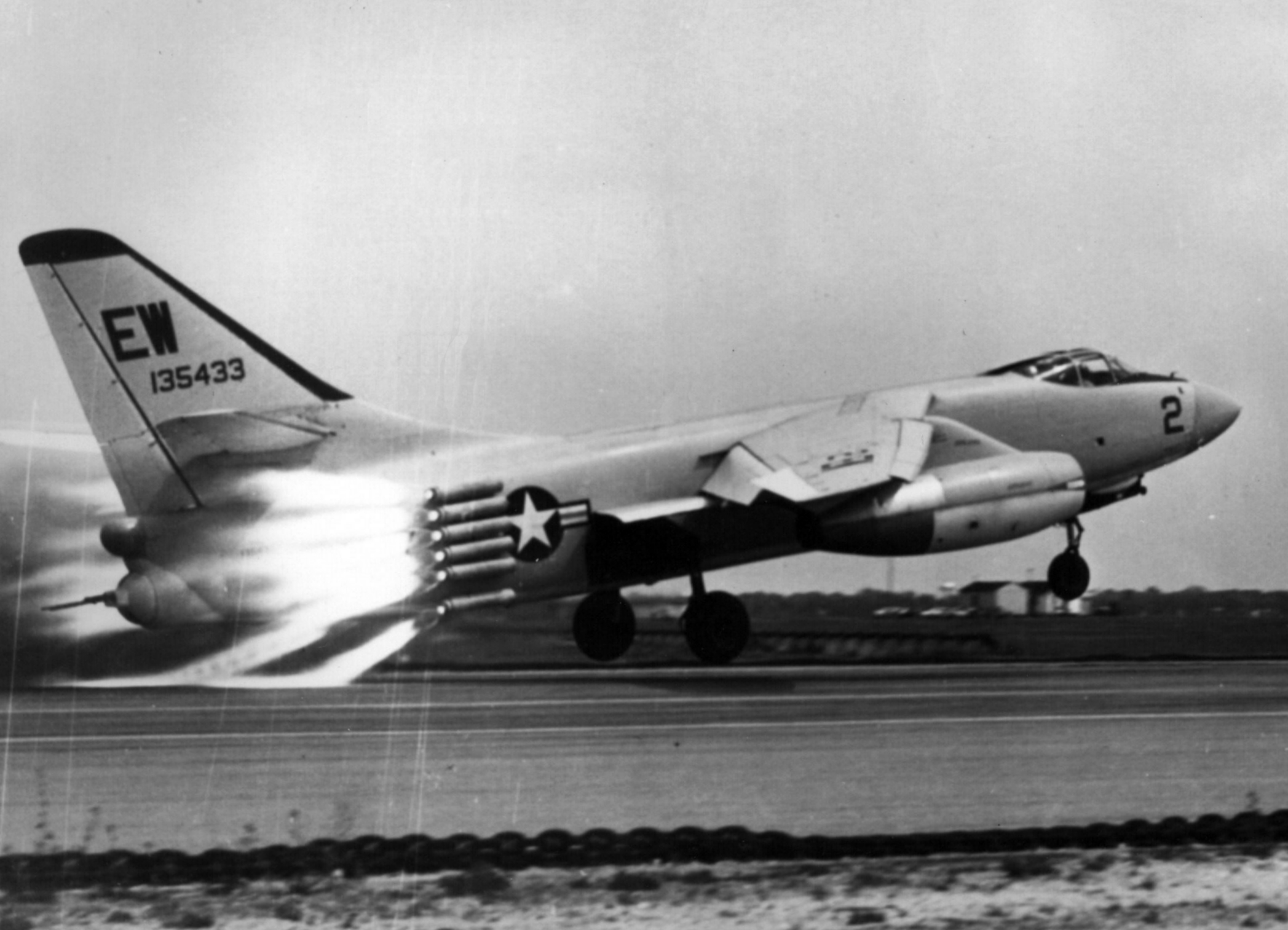
VAH-3 A3D-1 Skywarrior makes a RATO takeoff from Naval Air Station Jacksonville, circa 1957

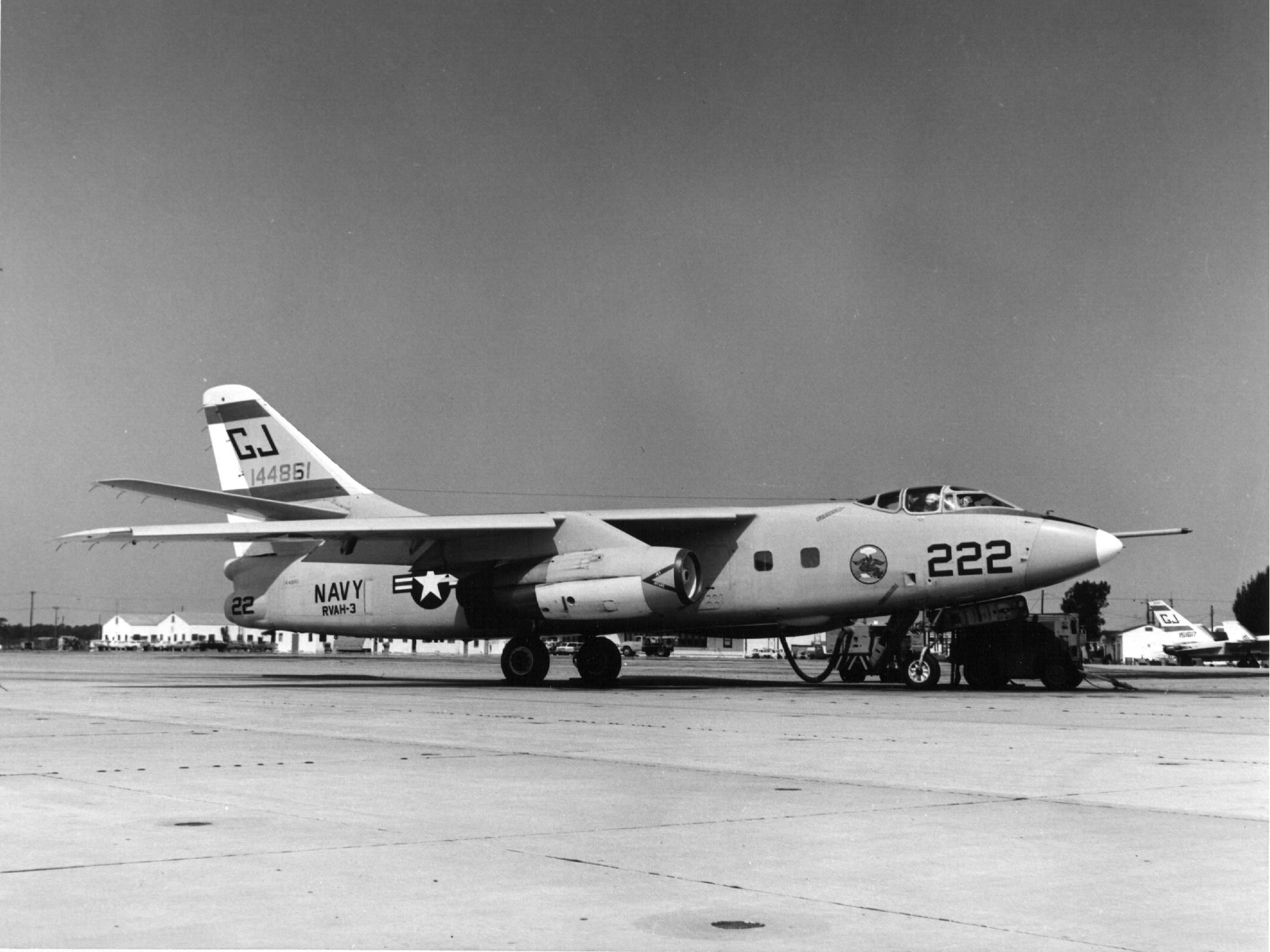
VAH3 TA-3B Skywarrior on the flight line at Naval Air Station Sanford, circa 1967

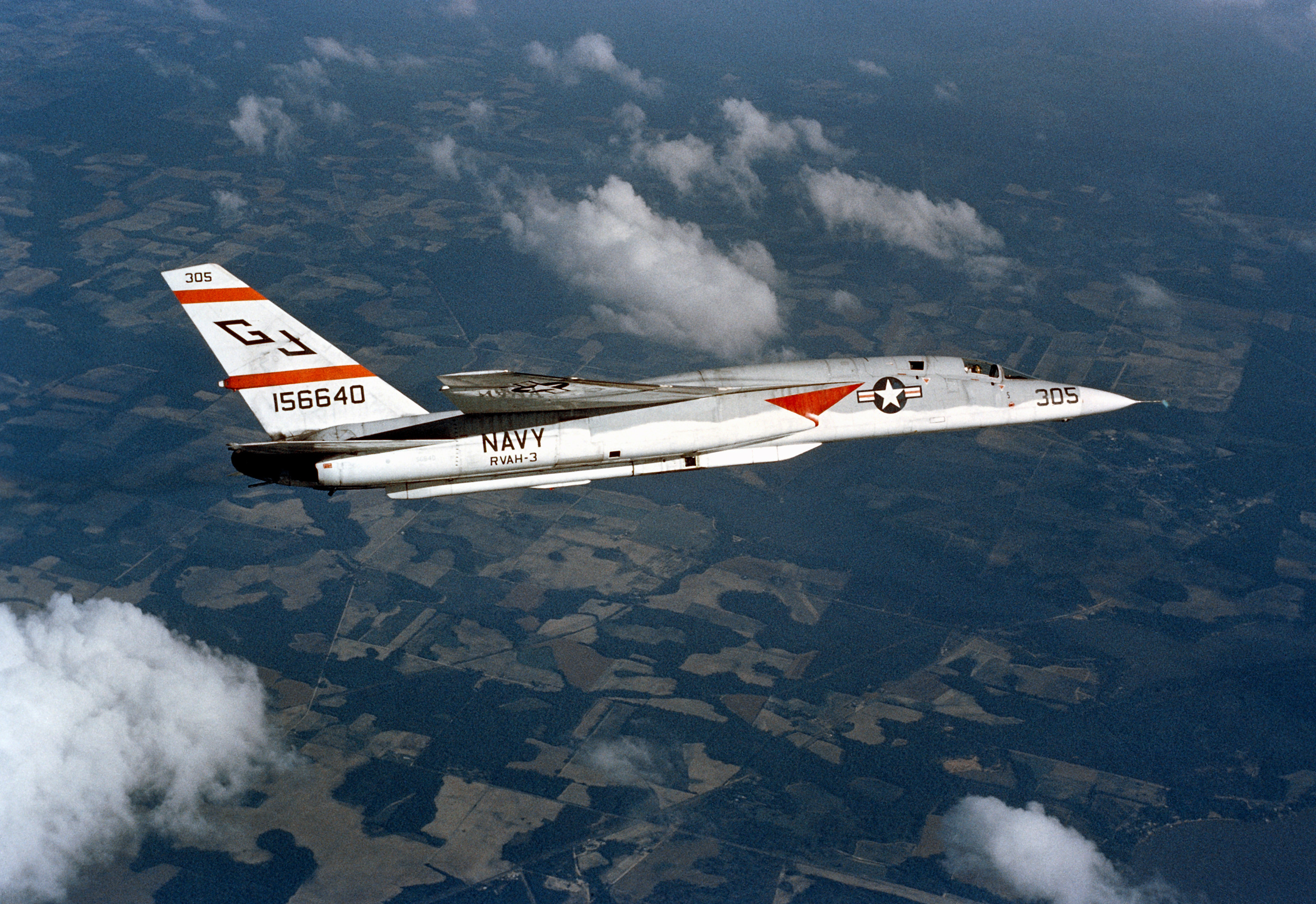
RVAH-3 RA-5C Vigilante in flight in 1976

=== VAH-3 ===
VAH-3 was initially established at Naval Air Station Jacksonville, Florida and was originally equipped with the A3D-1 Skywarrior. It made its only operational cruise from 12 July 1957 to 12 Mar 1958 aboard the USS Franklin D. Roosevelt (CVA-42) in the Mediterranean. In mid-1958, the squadron began accepting the upgraded A3D-2 version of the Skywarrior, relocated to Naval Air Station Sanford, Florida, and was merged with the U.S. Atlantic Fleet's Heavy Attack Training Unit Atlantic (HATULANT). VAH-3 was then designated as a Fleet Replacement Squadron (FRS) for the A3D for the Atlantic Fleet, inheriting a mix of aircraft from HATULANT including R4D-7s, P2V-3Bs, F9F-8Ts and A3D-2Ts (redesignated as TC-47K, P-2C, TF-9J and TA-3B in 1962).

VAH-3 received its first A3J-1 Vigilantes in June 1961 (redesignated as A-5A in September 1962), and began a "sole site" Fleet Replacement Squadron role for the Vigilante for both the Atlantic and Pacific Fleets concurrent with its existing Atlantic Fleet FRS role for the A3D-2 (redesignated as A-3Bs in September 1962) for the Atlantic Fleet VAH squadrons.

VAH-3 also provided concurrent FRS training support for the A3D-2P (redesignated as RA-3B in 1962) for Heavy Photographic Squadron 61 (VAP-61) based at Naval Air Station Jacksonville, Florida and the A3D-2Q (redesignated as EA-3B in 1962) training for Fleet Air Reconnaissance Squadron 2 (VQ-2) based at Naval Station Rota, Spain.

In December 1963, VAH-3 received its first RA-5C Vigilante aircraft and commenced training support for this conversion of the A-5A from a nuclear strike bomber to that of a high-speed carrier-based tactical reconnaissance aircraft.

With the graduation of the last A-3B Skywarrior class in January 1964, VAH-3 divested itself from A-3B, RA-3B, and EA-3B FRS responsibilities, transferring all Skywarrior training for both the Atlantic Fleet and Pacific Fleet to VAH-123 at Naval Air Station Whidbey Island, Washington until VAH-123's disestablishment in 1971. With FRS functions subsequently focused on RA-5C training for both the Atlantic and Pacific Fleets, VAH-3 was redesignated as RVAH-3 in 1964. However, the squadron would continue to operate the TA-3B in support of RA-5C Vigilante training for Naval Flight Officers until RVAH-3's disestablishment in 1979.

=== RVAH-3 ===
Following VAH-3's redesignation as RVAH-3 in 1964, the squadron was tasked with performing all RA-5C FRS functions for both the Atlantic and Pacific Fleets at Naval Air Station Sanford. In this capacity, RVAH-3 provided initial, recurrent and transition training for Naval Aviators and Naval Flight Officers in the RA-5C through a combination of ground school, flight simulator events in operational flight trainers and weapon system trainers, and training syllabus flights in the RA-5C, as well as the TF-9J (later replaced by the TA-4F and TA-4J Skyhawk II) for pilots and the TA-3B for Naval Flight Officers.

Maintenance training for enlisted maintenance personnel and a small cohort of officers was conducted via the RA-5C Fleet Replacement Aircraft Maintenance Program (RA-5C FRAMP), collocated with RVAH-3 under the cognizance of a collocated Naval Air Maintenance Training Detachment. RVAH-3 would also provide training for those enlisted personnel outside of the aircraft maintenance specialties (e.g., photographers mate, photographic intelligenceman (later renamed intelligence specialist), yeoman, operations specialist, data systems technician, data processing technician, illustrator/draftsman) who would support the Integrated Operational Intelligence Centers, later renamed Carrier Intelligence Centers, aboard all aircraft carriers upon which the RA-5C and its associated RVAH squadrons would embark.

Budget constraints of the Vietnam War required the Department of Defense to close several stateside air bases during the late 1960s, and it was under such pressures that Naval Air Station Sanford was identified for closure in 1968. As a result, RVAH-3 relocated in May 1968 to the former Turner Air Force Base, renamed Naval Air Station Albany, Georgia, joining Reconnaissance Attack Wing One (RECONTAKWING ONE) and other Fleet RVAH squadrons that would incrementally relocate to Naval Air Station Albany throughout that year.

RVAH-3 would remain at NAS Albany for six years, to include the end of U.S. military involvement in Vietnam. Post-Vietnam defense budget reductions again compelled the Department of Defense to close more stateside air bases, and NAS Albany was marked for closure in 1974. Once again, RVAH-3, RECONATKWING ONE and the Fleet RVAH squadrons relocated, this time to Naval Air Station Key West, Florida beginning in January 1974. RVAH-3 would continue to conduct RA-5C fleet replacement training at Naval Air Station Key West until August 1979.

Attrition of airframes and the increasing maintenance and flight hour costs of the RA-5C in a constrained post-Vietnam defense budget environment forced the Navy to incrementally retire the RA-5C and sunset the RVAH community beginning in mid-1974. With the RA-5C marked for retirement from the active Navy inventory, all RVAH squadrons were disestablished by 1980. Although the Navy's light photographic squadron (VFP) community provided interim replacement for RVAH assets utilizing the RF-8G Crusader from 1978 until 1987, the Navy's tactical reconnaissance mission was eventually fully transferred to the fighter (VF) community to be performed by F-14 Tomcat aircraft equipped with the Tactical Air Reconnaissance Pod System.

RVAH-3 was subsequently disestablished at Naval Air Station Key West on 23 August 1979, following over 23 years of active naval service.

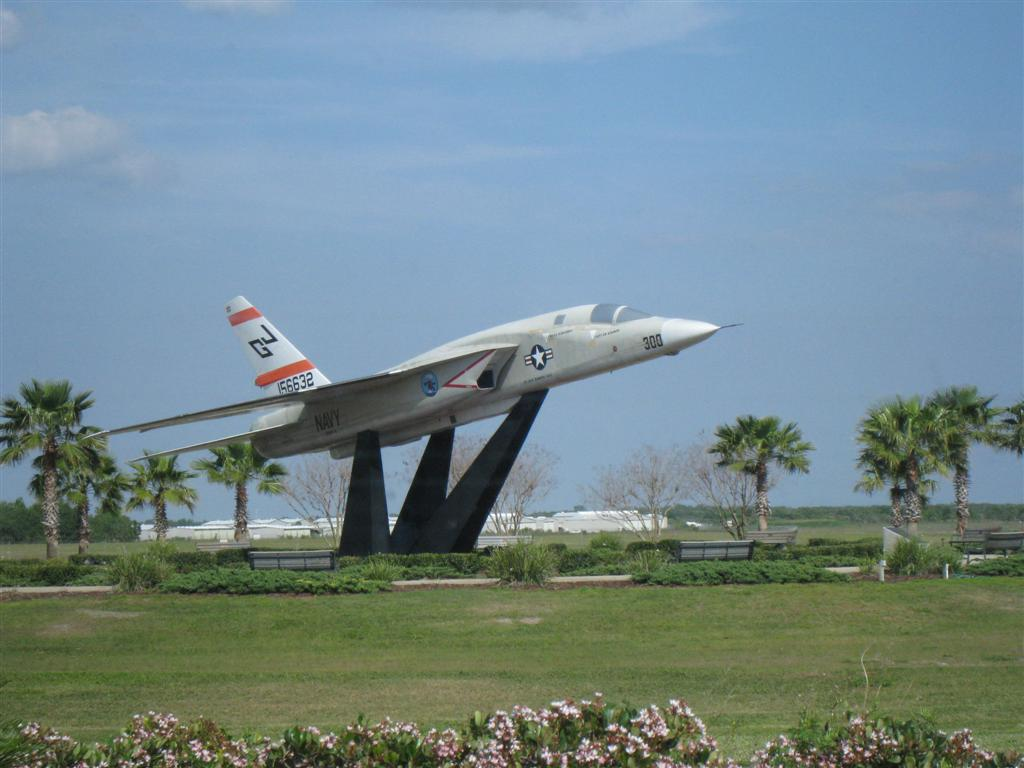
RA-5C Vigilante (BuNo 156632) in the markings of Reconnaissance Attack Squadron 3 on display at Orlando Sanford International Airport, the former Naval Air Station Sanford, circa 2008.

== Home station assignments ==
The squadron was assigned to these home stations:

- Naval Air Station Jacksonville, Florida
- Naval Air Station Sanford, Florida
- Naval Air Station Albany, Georgia
- Naval Air Station Key West, Florida

== Aircraft operated ==
- A-3A (A3D-1) / A-3B (A3D-2) / TA-3B (A3D-2T) Skywarrior
- TC-47K (R4D-7) Skytrain
- P-2C (P2V-3B) Neptune
- TF-9J (F9F-8T) Cougar
- A-4C / A-4 E / TA-4F / TA-4J Skyhawk
- A-5A (A3J-1) / RA-5C (A3J-3P) Vigilante
  - Pre-Sept 1962 designations indicated in parentheses

== See also ==
- Reconnaissance aircraft
- List of inactive United States Navy aircraft squadrons
- History of the United States Navy
