= RVAH-13 =

Reconnaissance Attack (Heavy) Squadron 13
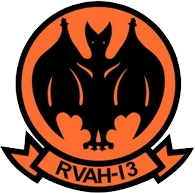
- RVAH-13 squadron patch
- Active: 3 January 1961–30 June 1976
- Country: United States
- Branch: United States Navy
- Role: Photo-reconnaissance
- Part of: Inactive
- Nickname(s): Bats
- Engagements: Vietnam War

RVAH-13 was a Reconnaissance Attack (Heavy) Squadron of the U.S. Navy. Originally established as Heavy Attack Squadron Thirteen (VAH-13) on 3 January 1961 it was redesignated as Reconnaissance Attack (Heavy) Squadron Thirteen (RVAH-13) on 1 November 1964. The squadron was disestablished on 30 June 1976.

== Operational history ==
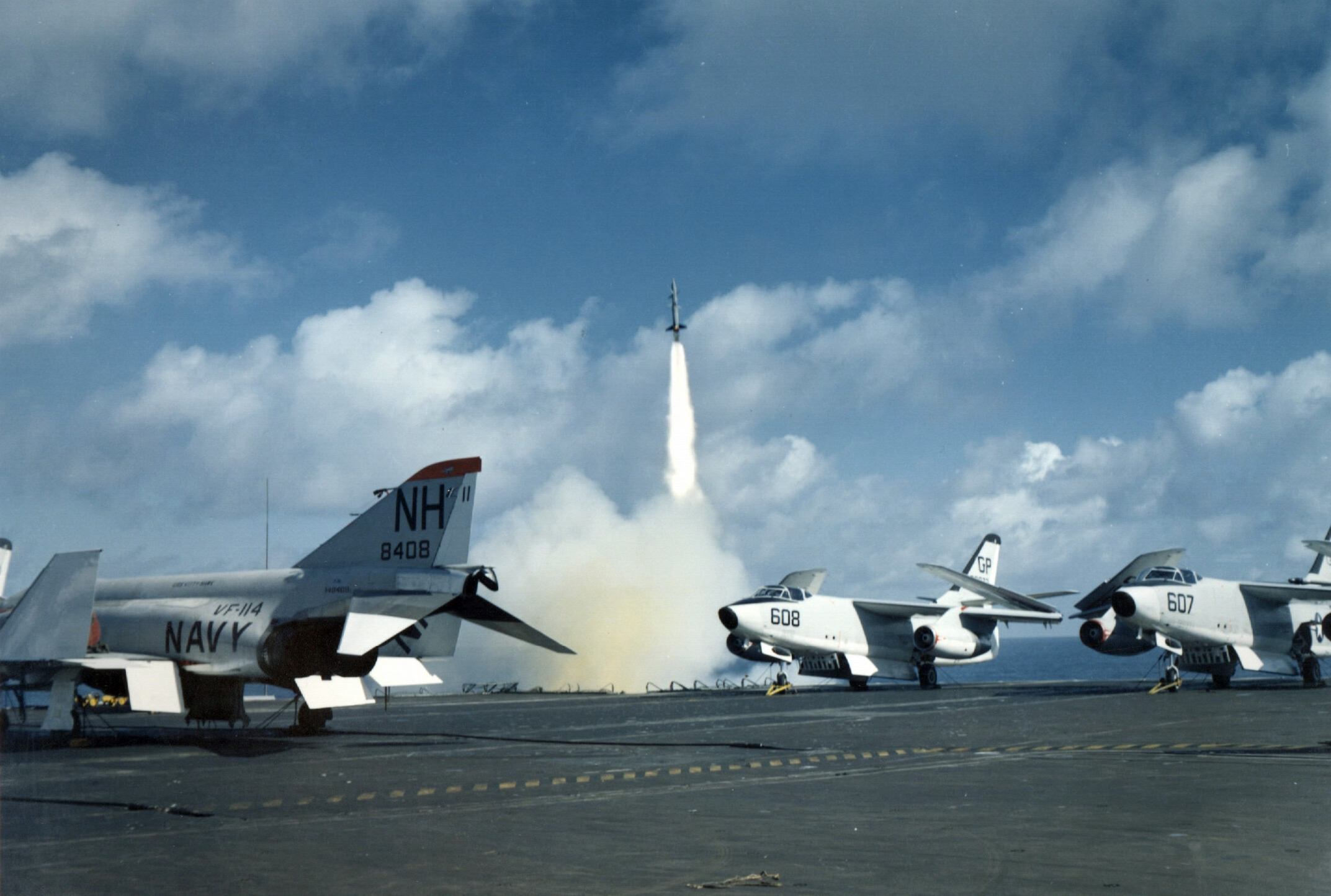
RIM-2 Terrier missile launches behind 2 VAH-13 A-3B Skywarrior on USS Kitty Hawk c.1962

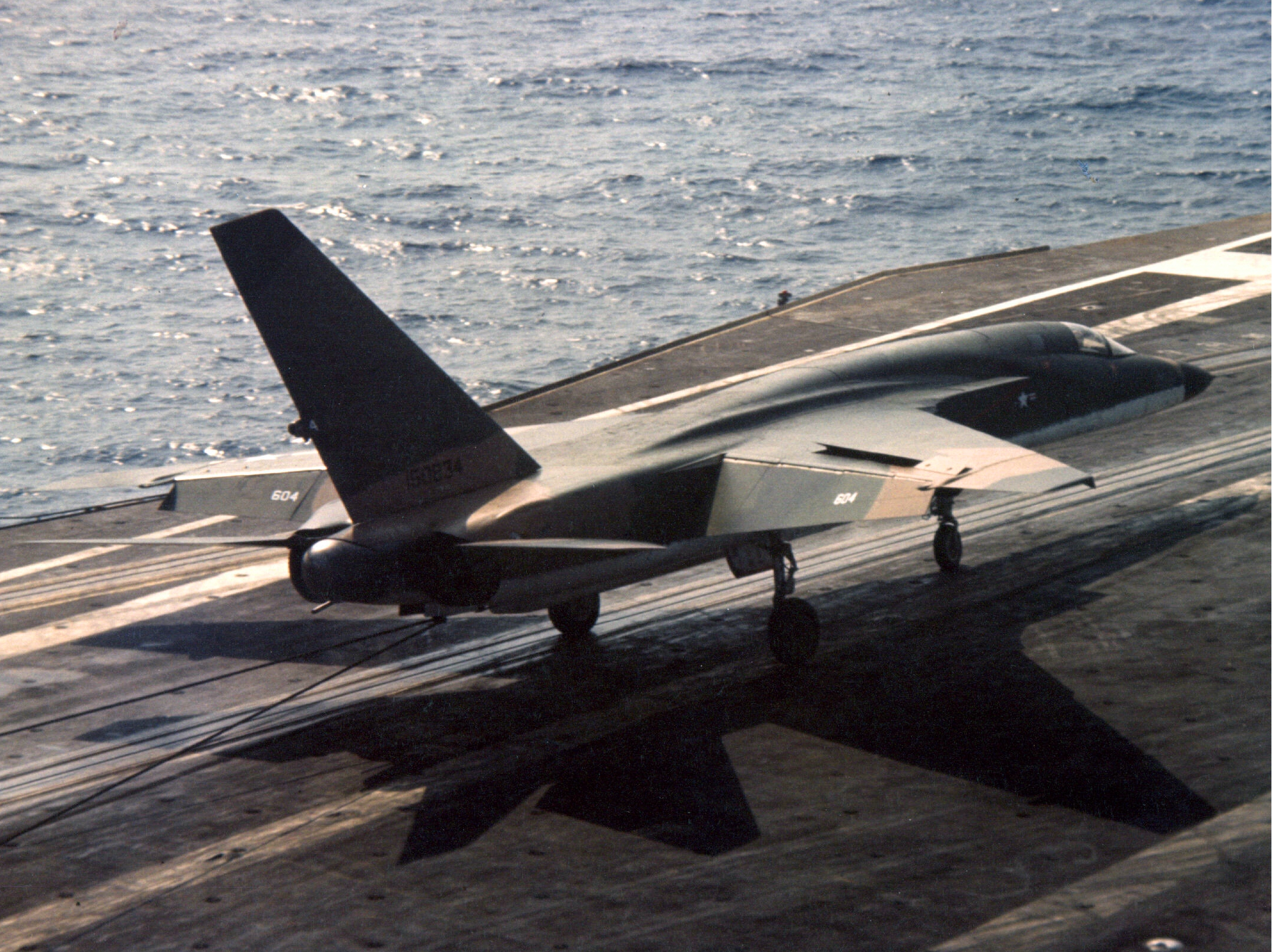
Camouflaged RVAH-13 RA-5C Vigilante lands on USS Kitty Hawk in 1966

=== VAH-13 ===
VAH-13 was established on 3 January at Naval Air Station Sanford, Florida, with twelve A3D-2 Skywarrior aircraft assigned. Upon completion of initial training, the squadron was assigned to Carrier Air Group 11 (later Carrier Air Wing 11) and deployed aboard the newly commissioned USS Kitty Hawk for her shakedown cruise in the Caribbean. Shortly thereafter, VAH-13 transferred to the Pacific Fleet, the squadron's Detachment A embarking aboard Kitty Hawk for her 11 August - 1 November 1961 transit from the Western and Southern Atlantic to the Eastern Pacific en route to her new homeport of Naval Air Station North Island in San Diego, California, while the remainder of the squadron relocated to its new home station of Naval Air Station Whidbey Island, Washington. In September 1962, in accordance with a new DoD aircraft designation systems, the squadron's A3D-2 aircraft were redesignated as the A-3B Skywarrior.

For the next three years, VAH-13 maintained readiness requirements and served with the U.S. Seventh Fleet, deploying as follows:

- 13 September 1962 – 2 April 1963, VAH-13 embarked aboard USS Kitty Hawk for its first Western Pacific (WESTPAC) deployment.
- 17 October 1963 – 20 July 1964, VAH-13 embarked aboard USS Kitty Hawk for a WESTPAC deployment.

In anticipation of its transition to the RA-5C Vigilante, VAH-13 moved back to Naval Air Station Sanford in August 1964. The squadron received its first RA-5C on 5 October 1964, followed by its redesignation as RVAH-13 on 1 November 1964.

=== RVAH-13 / Cold War and Vietnam ===
With the increasing U.S. military involvement in Vietnam after 1964, RVAH-13 was added to the mix of RVAH squadrons participating in combat operations in Southeast Asia. In conducting pre- and post-strike reconnaissance, the RA-5C would incur the highest loss rate of any U.S. Navy combat aircraft during the Vietnam War, and RVAH-13's experience would more than reflect this.

RVAH-13's Cold War / Vietnam-era deployments were as follows:

- 19 October 1965 – 13 June 1966, RVAH-13 embarked aboard USS Kitty Hawk for a WESTPAC and Vietnam deployment.
  - On 20 December 1965, RA-5C BuNo 151624 was hit by antiaircraft fire and lost in combat over North Vietnam. Both crewmen were initially listed as Missing in Action (MIA) until 1977 when the Vietnamese government confirmed that the pilot, LCDR Guy D. Johnson, and the reconnaissance attack navigator, LTJG Lee "Shack" Nordahl, were killed. LCDR Johnson's remains (promoted to CDR and CAPT while MIA), were returned to the United States in March 1977. LTJG Nordahl's remains (promoted to LT and LCDR while MIA) were never recovered.
  - On 22 December 1965, RA-5C BuNo 151632 was hit by an SA-2 surface-to-air missile and lost in combat over North Vietnam. Reconnaissance attack navigator LTJG Glenn Daigle successfully ejected, was captured by the North Vietnamese as a POW, and repatriated to the United States on 12 February 1973. The pilot, LCDR Max Lukenbach, was Killed in Action, body not recovered (KIA/BNR).
  - On 3 February 1966, RA-5C BuNo 151625 was lost in combat due to AAA fire. Crew ejected and landed near Cap Bouton, North Vietnam. The pilot, LT Gerald Coffee, was captured by the North Vietnamese as a POW (promoted to LCDR and CDR while a POW) and repatriated to the United States on 12 February 1973. Remains of the RRAN, LTJG Robert T. Hanson, Jr., (promoted to LT and LCDR while MIA) were returned to the United States in November 1988.
- 5 November 1966 – 19 June 1967, RVAH-13 was embarked aboard USS Kitty Hawk for a WESTPAC and Vietnam deployment.
  - 9 March 1967, RA-5C BuNo 151627 was lost in combat. The reconnaissance attack navigator, Lieutenant (junior grade) Frank Predergast, successfully ejected and was rescued. The pilot and RVAH-13 Commanding Officer, Commander Charlie Putnam, also ejected and is believed to have been captured and died in captivity. He was posthumously promoted to captain, and his remains were returned to the United States in November 1988.
  - 19 May 1967, RA-5C BuNo 150826 was lost in combat over Hanoi, North Vietnam. The pilot, Lieutenant Commander James Griffin and the RAN, Lieutenant Jack Walters were seriously injured during their ejection. Both were captured, but both died of their injuries within 24 to 48 hours of capture. Their remains were returned to the United States in March 1974.
- 10 April - 16 December 1968, RVAH-13 embarked aboard USS America for a WESTPAC and Vietnam deployment.
  - Budgetary pressures of the Vietnam War forced the Department of Defense to close several stateside air bases, to include Naval Air Station Sanford. Upon return from their 1968 deployment, RVAH-13 shifted home stations from Naval Air Station Sanford to the former Turner Air Force Base, renamed Naval Air Station Albany, Georgia, effective December 1968.
- 2 December 1969 - 8 July 1970, RVAH-13 embarked aboard USS Forrestal for a Mediterranean deployment.
- 6 July 1971 - 17 December 1971, RVAH-13 embarked aboard USS America for a Mediterranean deployment.
- 12 September 1972 – 12 June 1973, RVAH-13 embarked aboard USS Enterprise for a WESTPAC and Vietnam deployment.
  - On 28 December 1972, during Operation Linebacker II, RA-5C BuNo 156633 was lost in combat when it was shot down by a Vietnam People's Air Force MiG-21. The pilot, LCDR Al Agnew, successfully ejected, was captured by the North Vietnamese as a POW, and repatriated to the United States on 29 March 1973. The RAN, LT Mike Haifley was listed as MIA until his remains were returned to the United States in August 1985.

=== RVAH-13 / Cold War (post-Vietnam) ===
With the end of the Vietnam War, RVAH-13 returned to stateside training and forward deployed Cold War presence operations aboard Fleet aircraft carriers. Budgetary pressures and force reductions following the end of the Vietnam War forced the Department of Defense to once again close several stateside air bases, to include Naval Air Station Albany, Georgia, as an economy move. In April 1974, RVAH-13 executed a shift of home station from NAS Albany to Naval Air Station Key West, Florida.

Subsequent deployments for RVAH-13 were as follows:

- 7 May 1974 - 18 October 1974, RVAH-13 embarked aboard USS Ranger for a WESTPAC deployment.
- 15 October 1975 - 24 April 1976, RVAH-13 embarked aboard USS Independence for a Mediterranean deployment.

Attrition of airframes and the increasing maintenance and flight hour costs of the RA-5C in a constrained defense budget environment forced the Navy to incrementally retire the RA-5C and sunset the RVAH community beginning in mid-1974. Carrier-based reconnaissance was concurrently conducted by the active duty VFP community at Naval Air Station Miramar and the Naval Reserve VFP community at Andrews AFB / NAF Washington with the RF-8G Crusader until 29 March 1987, when the last RF-8G was retired and the mission was fully transferred to the active duty and Naval Reserve VF community at NAS Miramar, Naval Air Station Oceana, Naval Air Station Dallas and NAS JRB Fort Worth as a secondary role with the F-14 Tomcat equipped with the Tactical Air Reconnaissance Pod System (TARPS).

Following its return from its final Mediterranean deployment in 1976, RVAH-13 was disestablished at Naval Air Station Key West on 30 June 1976 following over 15 1/2 years of active naval service.

== Home stations ==
During its existence, VAH-13 / RVAH-13 was assigned to the following home stations:

- Naval Air Station Sanford, Florida (1961–1961)
- Naval Air Station Whidbey Island, Washington (1961–1964)
- Naval Air Station Sanford, Florida (1964–1968)
- Naval Air Station Albany, Georgia (1968–1974)
- Naval Air Station Key West, Florida (1974–1976)

== Aircraft Assigned ==
- A3D-2 / A-3B Skywarrior
- RA-5C Vigilante

== See also ==
- Reconnaissance aircraft
- List of inactive United States Navy aircraft squadrons
- History of the United States Navy
