= RVAH-12 =

US Navy squadron

Reconnaissance Attack (Heavy) Squadron 12
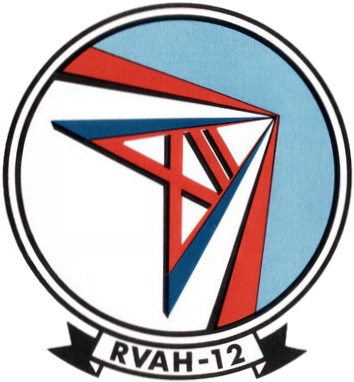
- RVAH-12 squadron patch
- Active: 1 July 1965 – 2 July 1979
- Country: United States
- Branch: United States Navy
- Role: Photo-reconnaissance
- Part of: Inactive
- Nickname(s): Speartips
- Engagements: Vietnam War

RVAH-12 was a Reconnaissance Attack (Heavy) Squadron of the U.S. Navy. The squadron was established on 1 July 1965 and disestablished on 2 July 1979.

== Operational history ==
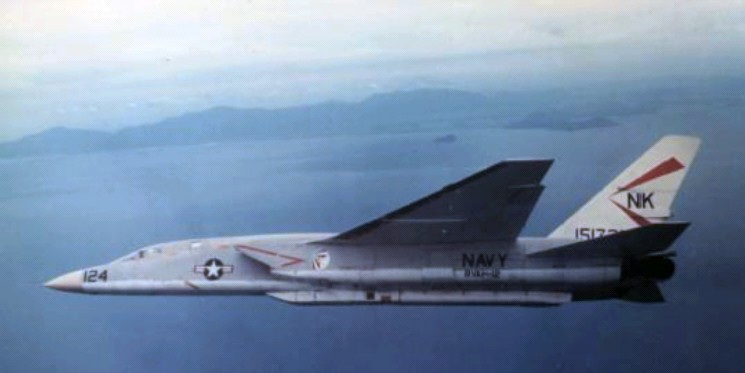
RVAH-12 RA-5C Vigilante offshore of Vietnam in 1967

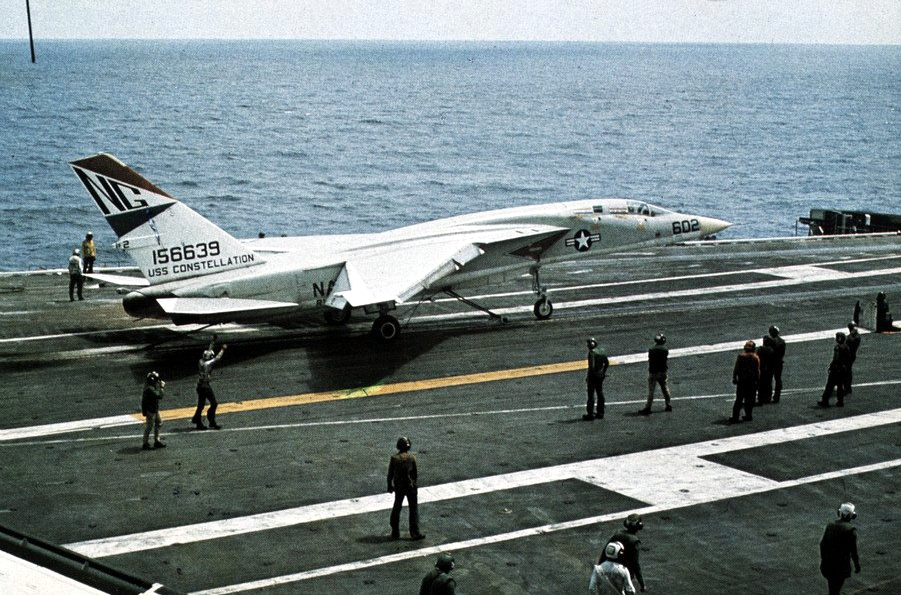
RVAH-12 RA-5C prepares to launch from USS Constellation in 1973

=== RVAH-12 / Cold War and Vietnam ===
RVAH-12 was established on 1 July 1965 at Naval Air Station Sanford, Florida, the first squadron to specifically be formed to operate the RA-5C Vigilante. Early in its history, RVAH-12 was selected as the short-term host for a little known, and at the time, highly sensitive project known as Snare. This involved the installation of an articulated infrared spectrum sensor on the top side of two aircraft, BuNo 148933 and BuNo 151727, just ahead of the vertical stabilizer. The purpose of Snare was to obtain laser emitter and other related data from special Soviet Tu-16 Badger, Tu-95 Bear, and M-4 Bison long range bombers flying observation missions of U.S. Navy carrier battle groups from Russian soil. Snare operations were conducted for a short period during RVAH-12's 1971-1972 Mediterranean deployment aboard USS Independence.

RVAH-12's Cold War / Vietnam-era deployments were as follows:

- 11 March 1966 – 26 October 1966, RVAH-12 was embarked aboard USS Saratoga for a Mediterranean deployment.
- 29 April - 4 December 1967, RVAH-12 was embarked aboard USS Constellation for a Western Pacific (WESTPAC) and Vietnam deployment.
  - On 13 August 1967, an RVAH-12 RA-5C, BuNo 151634, was shot down over North Vietnam. Both crewmen LCDR Leo Hyatt and LTJG Wayne Goodermote ejected successfully, were captured by the North Vietnamese, and were repatriated to the United States on 14 March 1973.
  - On 17 August 1967, an RVAH-12 RA-5C, BuNo 149302, was hit by antiaircraft fire over North Vietnam. The aircraft failed to return to the ship and the pilot, Commander Laurent Dion, and the reconnaissance attack navigator, Lieutenant (junior grade) Charles Hom, were listed with an initial finding of missing in action, followed later by a presumptive finding of killed in action.
- Budgetary pressures of the Vietnam War force the Department of Defense to close several stateside air bases, to include Naval Air Station Sanford, Florida. Upon return from their 1967 deployment, RVAH-12 shifts home stations from NAS Sanford to the former Turner Air Force Base, renamed Naval Air Station Albany, Georgia, effective 1 May 1968.
- 22 July 1968 – 29 April 1969, RVAH-12 was embarked aboard USS Forrestal for a Mediterranean deployment.
- 10 April-21 December 1970, RVAH-12 was embarked aboard USS America for a WESTPAC and Vietnam deployment.
- 16 September 1971 – 16 March 1972, RVAH-12 was embarked aboard USS Independence for a Mediterranean deployment.
- 5 January-11 October 1973, RVAH-12 was embarked on USS Constellation for a WESTPAC and Vietnam deployment.

=== RVAH-12 / Cold War (post-Vietnam) ===
With the end of the Vietnam War, RVAH-12 returned to stateside training and forward deployed Cold War presence operations aboard Fleet aircraft carriers. In addition, budgetary pressures and force reductions following the end of the Vietnam War force the Department of Defense to once again close several stateside air bases, to include Naval Air Station Albany, Georgia. In January 1974, RVAH-12 shifted home stations from NAS Albany to Naval Air Station Key West, Florida.

RVAH-12's subsequent deployments were as follows:

- 17 September 1974 – 20 May 1975, RVAH-12 was embarked on USS Enterprise for a WESTPAC deployment.
- 30 March 1977 – 21 October 1977, RVAH-12 was embarked aboard USS Independence for a Mediterranean deployment.
- 3 October 1978 – 7 February 1979, USS Saratoga for a Mediterranean deployment and RVAH-12's final overseas deployment.
  - On 31 October 1978, an RVAH-12 RA-5C, BuNo 156610, experienced a landing mishap ashore at Naval Station Rota, Spain. The aircraft was damaged beyond economical repair and was stricken in place at NS Rota where it continued to be used as a crash and egress trainer for the station's crash, fire and rescue personnel.

Attrition of airframes and the increasing maintenance and flight hour costs of the RA-5C in a constrained defense budget environment forced the Navy to incrementally retire the RA-5C and sunset the RVAH community beginning in mid-1974. Carrier-based reconnaissance was concurrently conducted by the active duty VFP community at Naval Air Station Miramar and the Naval Reserve VFP community at Andrews Air Force Base / NAF Washington with the RF-8G Crusader until 29 March 1987, when the last RF-8G was retired and the mission was fully transferred to the active duty and Naval Reserve VF community at NAS Miramar, Naval Air Station Oceana, Naval Air Station Dallas and NAS JRB Fort Worth as a secondary role with the F-14 Tomcat equipped with the Tactical Air Reconnaissance Pod System.

Following its return from its final Mediterranean deployment in 1979, RVAH-12 was disestablished at Naval Air Station Key West on 2 July 1979 following 14 years and 1 day of active naval service.

== Home port assignments ==
The squadron was assigned to these home ports:

- Naval Air Station Sanford, Florida
- Naval Air Station Albany, Georgia
- Naval Air Station Key West, Florida

== Aircraft assignment ==
- RA-5C Vigilante

== See also ==
- Reconnaissance aircraft
- List of inactive United States Navy aircraft squadrons
- History of the United States Navy
