= RVAH-14 =

Reconnaissance Attack (Heavy) Squadron 14
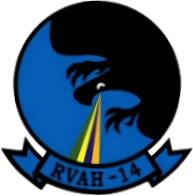
- RVAH-14 squadron patch
- Active: 14 February 1968 – 1 May 1974
- Country: United States
- Branch: United States Navy
- Role: Photo-reconnaissance
- Part of: Inactive
- Nickname(s): Eagle Eyes

RVAH-14 was a Reconnaissance Attack (Heavy) Squadron of the U.S. Navy. The squadron was established on 14 February 1968 and disestablished on 1 May 1974.

== Operational history ==
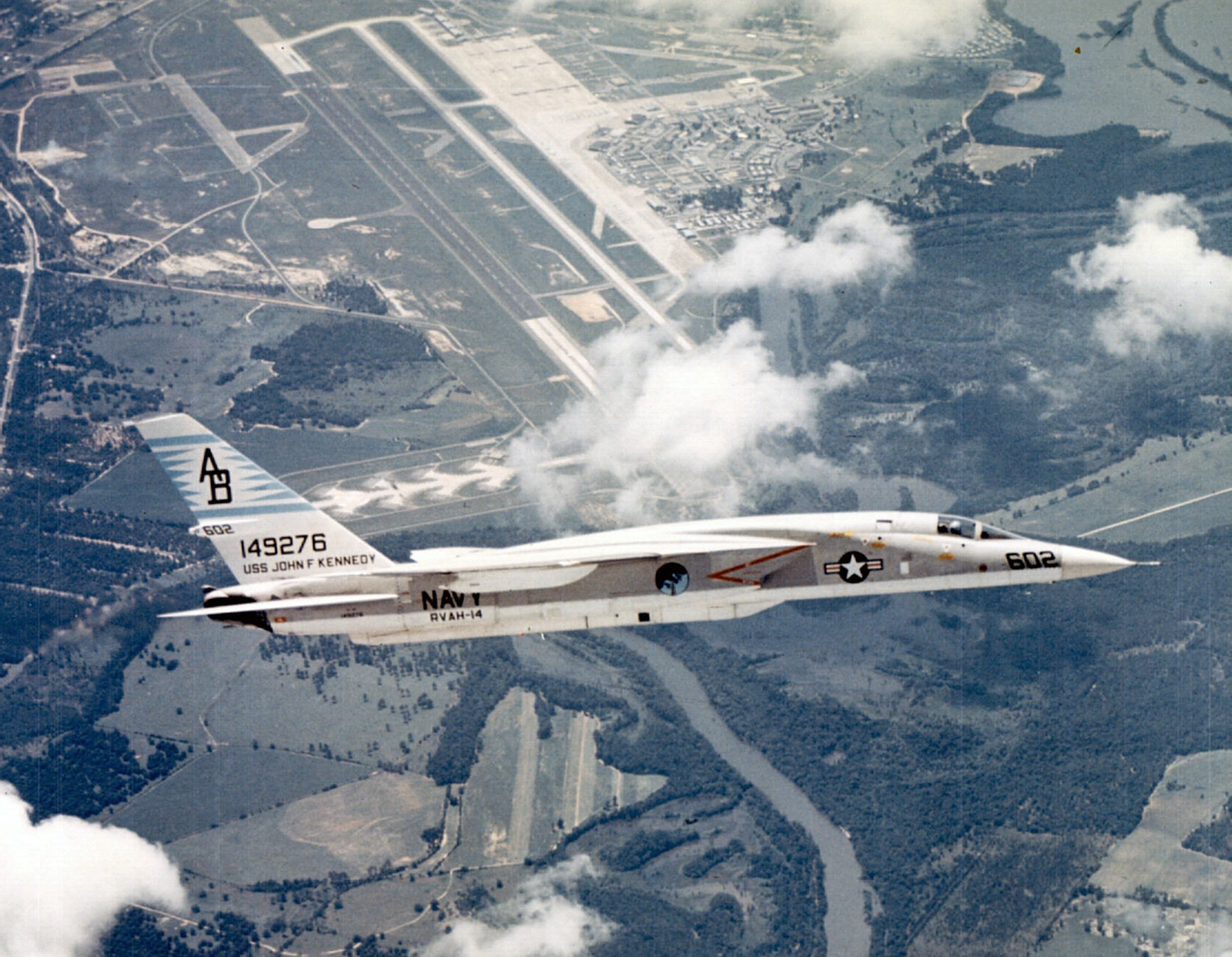
RVAH-14 RA-5C Vigilante over Naval Air Station Albany in 1969

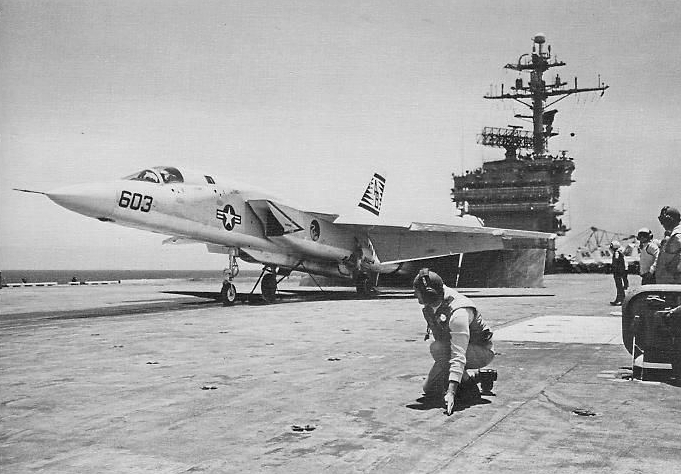
RVAH-14 RA-5C prepares to launch from USS John F. Kennedy, circa 1970

=== RVAH-14 ===
RVAH-14 was the last squadron specifically formed to operate the RA-5C Vigilante and was most short-lived of any RVAH squadron. RVAH-14 was initially established on 1 February 1968 at Naval Air Station Sanford, Florida in order to accommodate the impending commissioning of the USS John F. Kennedy, the latter of which was scheduled for 7 September 1968. Throughout its existence, RVAH-14 concentrated on Cold War operations, primarily in support of the U.S. Sixth Fleet in the Mediterranean, and was the only frontline RVAH squadron not to see combat action or a WESTPAC deployment during the Vietnam War. The squadron's emblem was created by cartoonist Roy Crane, the creator of the Buz Sawyer comic strip.

Prior to its first overseas deployment, budgetary pressures of the Vietnam War necessitated that the Department of Defense close or realign several stateside air bases, to include the closure of Naval Air Station Sanford. As a result, only months following its establishment, RVAH-14 shifted home stations from NAS Sanford to the former Turner Air Force Base, renamed Naval Air Station Albany, Georgia, effective 1 May 1968.

RVAH-14's overseas deployments were as follows:

- 5 April 1969 – 20 December 1969, RVAH-14 embarked aboard USS John F. Kennedy for a Mediterranean deployment.
- 14 September 1970 – 28 February 1971, RVAH-14 embarked aboard USS John F. Kennedy for a Mediterranean deployment.
- 1 December 1971 – 6 October 1971, RVAH-14 embarked aboard USS John F. Kennedy for a Mediterranean deployment.
- 21 June 1973 – 19 January 1974, RVAH-14 embarked aboard USS Independence for a Mediterranean deployment.

With the end of the Vietnam War, budgetary pressures and force reductions forced the Department of Defense to once again close several stateside air bases, to include the closure of Naval Air Station Albany, Georgia. As a result, Reconnaissance Attack Wing One and all RVAH squadrons were slated to relocate to Naval Air Station Key West, Florida.

However, attrition of airframes and the increasing maintenance and flight hour costs of the RA-5C in a constrained defense budget environment also forced the Navy to incrementally retire the RA-5C and sunset the RVAH community beginning in mid-1974. Carrier-based reconnaissance was concurrently conducted by the active duty VFP community at Naval Air Station Miramar and the Naval Reserve VFP community at Andrews Air Force Base / NAF Washington with the RF-8G Crusader until 29 March 1987, when the last RF-8G was retired and the mission was fully transferred to the active duty and Naval Reserve VF community at NAS Miramar, Naval Air Station Oceana, Naval Air Station Dallas and NAS JRB Fort Worth as a secondary role with the F-14 Tomcat equipped with the Tactical Air Reconnaissance Pod System (TARPS).

Due to these factors, RVAH-14 was selected to be the first RVAH squadron to inactivate. As a result, on 1 May 1974, before it could be transferred with the other RVAH squadrons to Naval Air Station Key West, RVAH-14 was disestablished at Naval Air Station Albany, Georgia.

== Home stations assignments ==
During its existence, RVAH-14 was assigned to these home stations:

- Naval Air Station Sanford, Florida
- Naval Air Station Albany, Georgia

== Aircraft Assigned ==
- RA-5C Vigilante

== See also ==
- Reconnaissance aircraft
- List of inactive United States Navy aircraft squadrons
- History of the United States Navy
