= Naval Air Station Sanford =

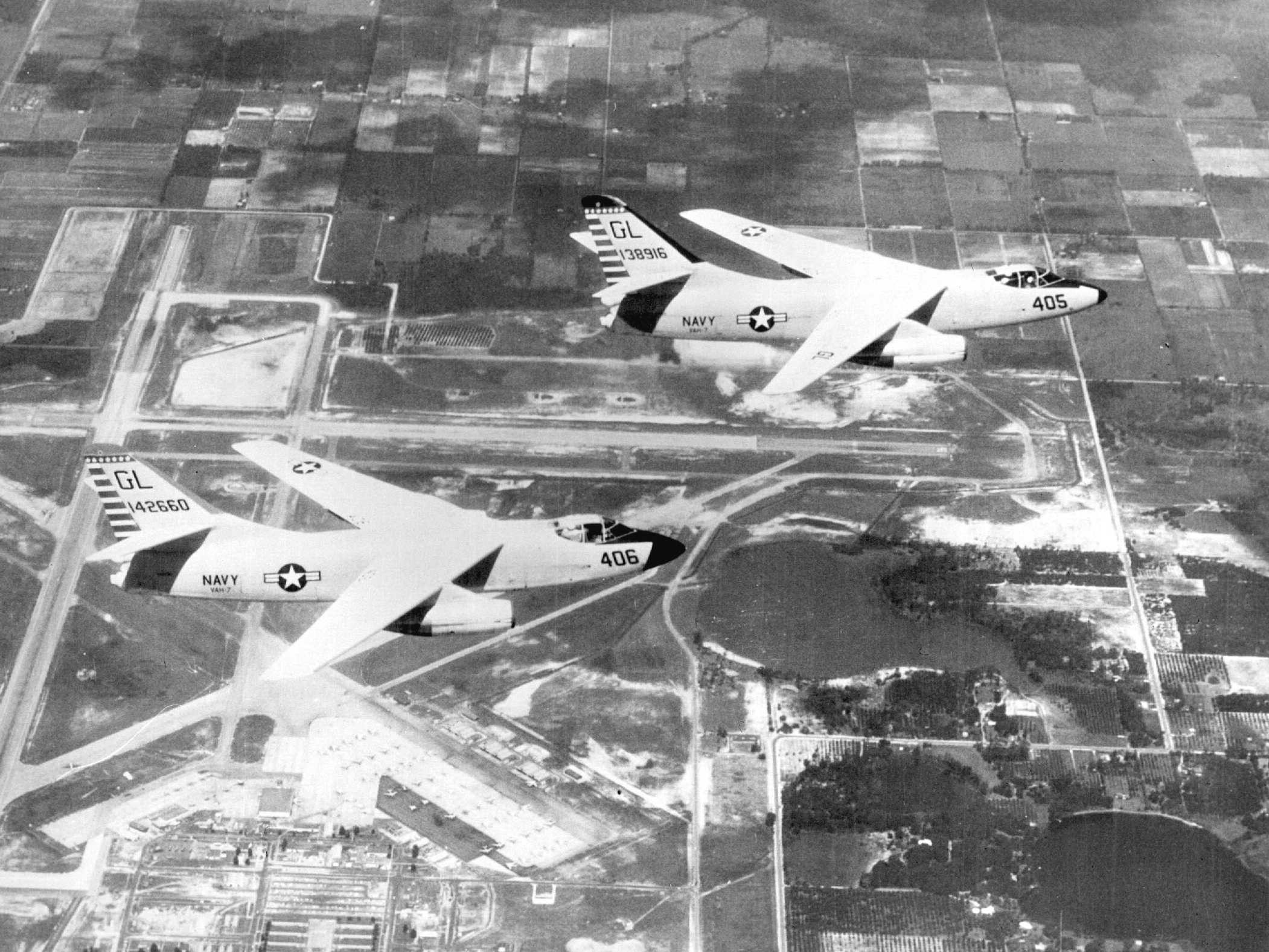
- A3D-2 (A-3B) Skywarriors of VAH-7, BuNo 138916 and Buno 142660, over NAS Sanford in the early 1960s
- IATA: NRJ; ICAO: KNRJ; FAA LID: NRJ

Summary
- Airport type: Military
- Owner: United States Navy
- Location: Sanford, Florida
- Elevation AMSL: 55 ft (17 m)
- Coordinates: 28°46′40″N 081°14′15″W

Map
- Location within Florida

Runways
Direction	Length		Surface
Direction	ft	m	Surface
9/27 (now 9L/27R)	8,000	2,438	Asphalt/concrete
18/36	6,002	1,829	Asphalt/concrete

Naval Air Station Sanford (IATA: ~~NRJ~~, ICAO: ~~KNRJ~~, FAA LID: ~~NRJ~~) was a naval air station of the United States Navy in Sanford, Florida, approximately 20 miles (36 km) north of Orlando, Florida. Opening less than a year after the start of World War II, NAS Sanford's initial function was as an advanced training base for land-based patrol bombers, followed by carrier-based fighter aircraft. The air station briefly closed in 1946 and was placed in caretaker status until being reactivated in 1950. It eventually served as a Master Jet Base for carrier-based heavy attack and reconnaissance aircraft until 1969. After its closure, it reopened as civilian general aviation airport under various names with a non-Navy civilian airport identifier (IATA: SFB, ICAO: KSFB, FAA LID: SFB) until finally transitioning to a scheduled air carrier airport under its current name of Orlando-Sanford International Airport.

== History ==
Prior to 1942, the Sanford Airport was an 865-acre civilian airfield with two runways that was owned by the City of Sanford. On 11 June 1942, the city deeded the facility to the U.S. Navy and Naval Air Station Sanford was commissioned as an active naval installation on 3 November 1942. NAS Sanford was initially assigned the airport codes NRJ and KNRJ. The base initially concentrated on advanced land-based patrol plane training, operating PV-1 Venturas, PBO Hudsons and SNB-2 Kansans. Peak wartime complement during 1943–1945 reached approximately 360 officers and 1400 enlisted men, both Navy and Marine Corps, with an additional complement of Naval Reserve officer and enlisted WAVES (Women Accepted for Volunteer Emergency Service) who served in air traffic control, meteorological services, administrative support, and aircraft maintenance.

In 1943, training at NAS Sanford shifted to a training mission with carrier-based fighter aircraft using the F4F, FM-1 and FM-2 Wildcat and F6F Hellcat. The air station also held oversight of an auxiliary airfield known as Outlying Field Osceola (OLF Osceola) approximately 6 nautical miles (11 km) east-southeast of NAS Sanford.

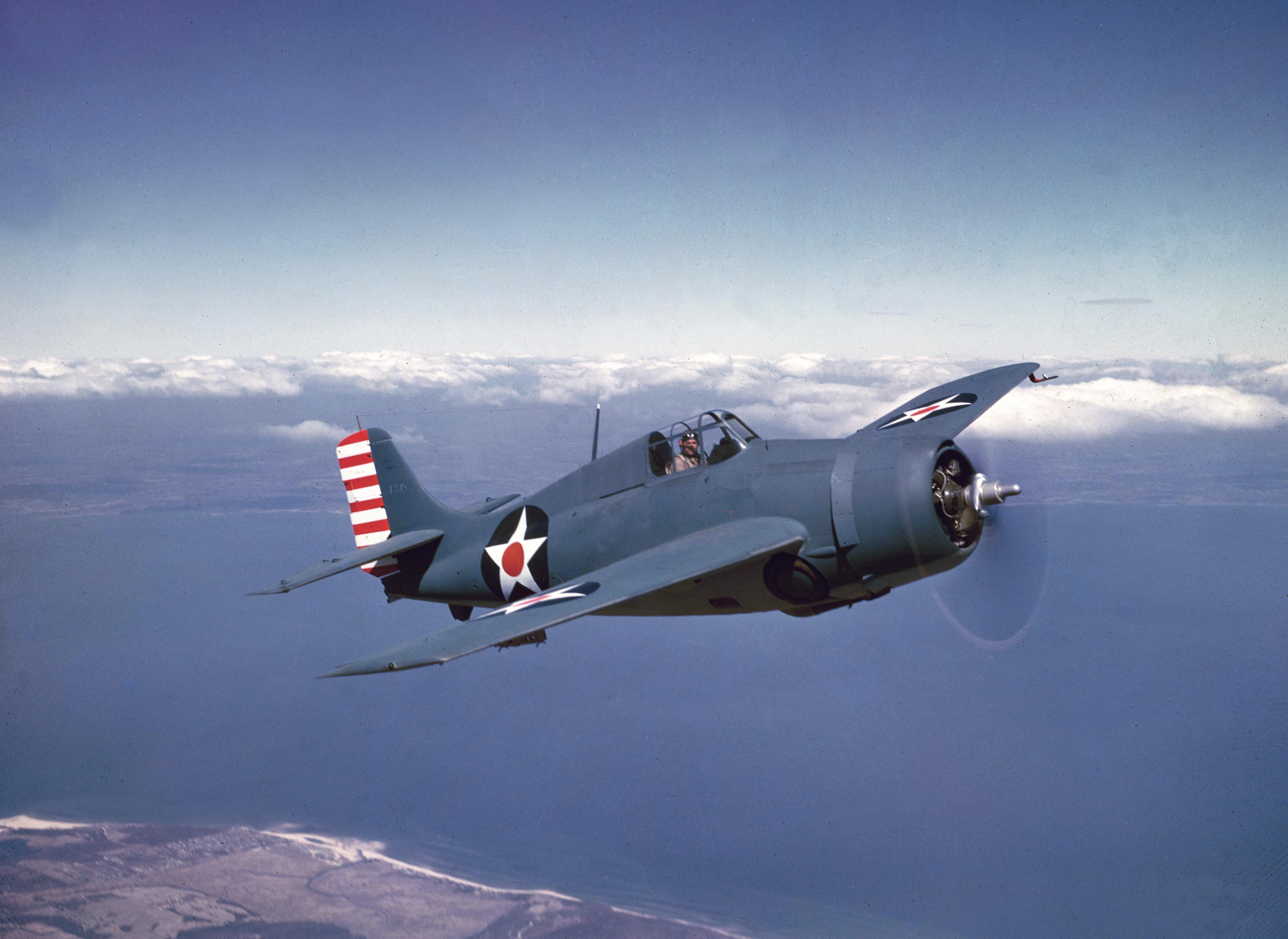
F4F Wildcat fighter, circa early 1942, similar to examples flown at NAS Sanford beginning the following year

Decommissioned in 1946 and placed in a caretaker status, the base was recommissioned as Naval Auxiliary Air Station Sanford (NAAS Sanford) in 1950 in response to both the Korean War and the Cold War. Subsequently, redesignated as a full naval air station and renamed NAS Sanford once again, the installation initially served as a home station for carrier-based F9F Panther, and F2H Banshee fighter aircraft, and AD Skyraider and AJ Savage attack aircraft in squadrons assigned to the U.S. Atlantic Fleet.

In the late 1950s, substantial upgrades followed in order to turn the air station into a Master Jet Base for the carrier-based Douglas A-3 Skywarrior (at the time, designated the A3D Skywarrior) nuclear attack aircraft of Heavy Attack Wing ONE (HATWING ONE). In addition to the Skywarrior, other associated sea-based and land-based training aircraft supporting A3D training, such as the F9F-8T Cougar and P2V-3W Neptune, were also assigned.

The upgrades to the former NAAS to achieve status as a full-fledged NAS and Master Jet Base included lengthening of the main runway to 8,000 feet (2,400 m) with additional overruns of approximately 2,000 feet (610 m) on both ends; construction of additional new hangars; barracks and administrative support buildings for the air station, heavy attack wing, heavy attack squadrons, and Marine Barracks; installation or upgrades to precision approach radar/ground controlled approach (PAR/GCA), non-directional beacon (NDB) and tactical air navigation (TACAN) navigational aids; a robust storage and distribution system for JP-5 jet fuel (which relied on resupply via a railroad spur into the base); secure weapon/air-dropped ordnance storage facilities; a Navy Dispensary; a Navy Exchange complex and associated garage/service station/MiniMart; and morale, welfare and recreation (MWR) facilities that included a base movie theater, two swimming pools, lakeside recreational facilities and separate clubs for officers, chief petty officer and enlisted personnel pay grade E-6 and below. Like Pinecastle AFB (later renamed McCoy AFB), a Strategic Air Command installation approximately 25 miles (40 km) to the south, a commissary and full-fledged Naval Hospital facilities were not considered necessary at NAS Sanford due to the relatively close proximity of a commissary and USAF Hospital at Central Florida's other major military installation at the time, the nearby Orlando AFB (which was transferred to the U.S. Navy's control in December 1968 and renamed Naval Training Center Orlando), approximately 12 miles (19 km) to the south.

NAAS / NAS Sanford also retained control of OLF Osceola into the early 1960s. However, OLF Osceola's 4000 to 5,000-foot (1,500 m) runways lacked sufficient length and pavement strength for contemporary carrier-based jet aircraft like the A3D. As a result, no improvements were made to the OLF's infrastructure and it was effectively abandoned as an operational facility.

HATWING ONE consisted of nine Heavy Attack Squadrons (VAH), also known as HATRONs: VAH-1, VAH-3, VAH-5, VAH-6, VAH-7, VAH-9, VAH-11, VAH-12 and VAH-13. All were Fleet deployable units with the exception of VAH-3, which conducted Replacement Air Group (RAG) / Fleet Replacement Squadron (FRS) functions. In addition to the HATWING ONE squadrons, Air Development Squadron FIVE (VX-5), based at NAWS China Lake, California, also maintained a detachment (VX-5 Det Alfa) at NAS Sanford until the detachment's relocation to Kirtland AFB, New Mexico in 1962.

Due to the Skywarrior's nuclear strike mission and the presence of an associated special weapons storage area at NAS Sanford, U.S. Marine Corps personnel provided both base security and special weapons storage area security, leading to the establishment of Marine Corps Barracks Sanford aboard the air station.

On 6 February 1959, NAS Sanford was dedicated as Ramey Field in honor of Lieutenant Commander Robert W. Ramey, USN, who lost his life in 1958 by electing to guide his crippled A3D Skywarrior away from a residential area. By staying with the aircraft, LCDR Ramey not only gave his flight crew time to bail out of the aircraft, but also saved the lives of numerous families in the residential community.

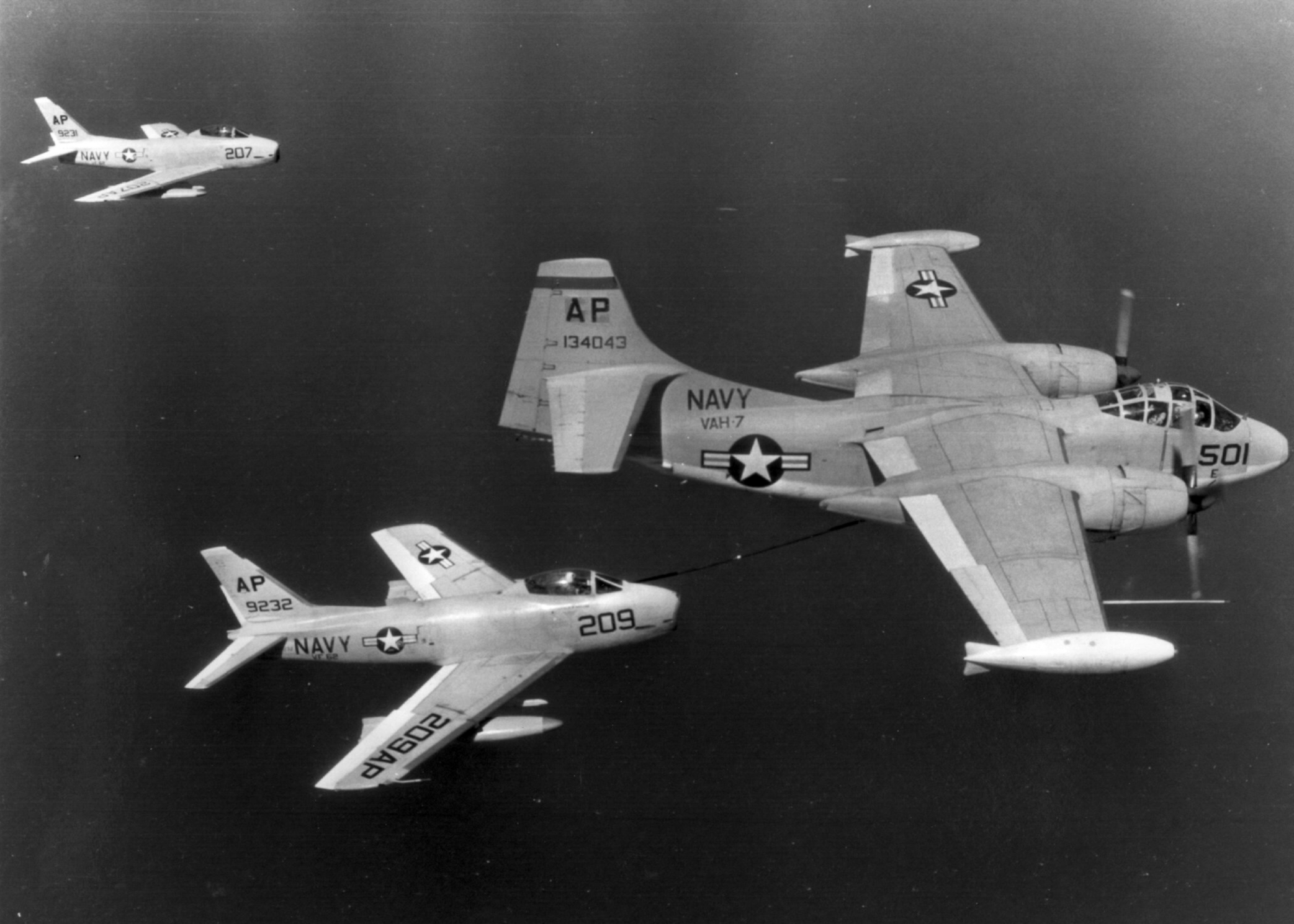
AJ-2 Savage, BuNo 134043 of Heavy Attack Squadron SEVEN (VAH-7) from then-NAAS Sanford refuels a pair of FJ-3M Fury fighters of Fighter Squadron SIX TWO (VF-62), circa 1958.

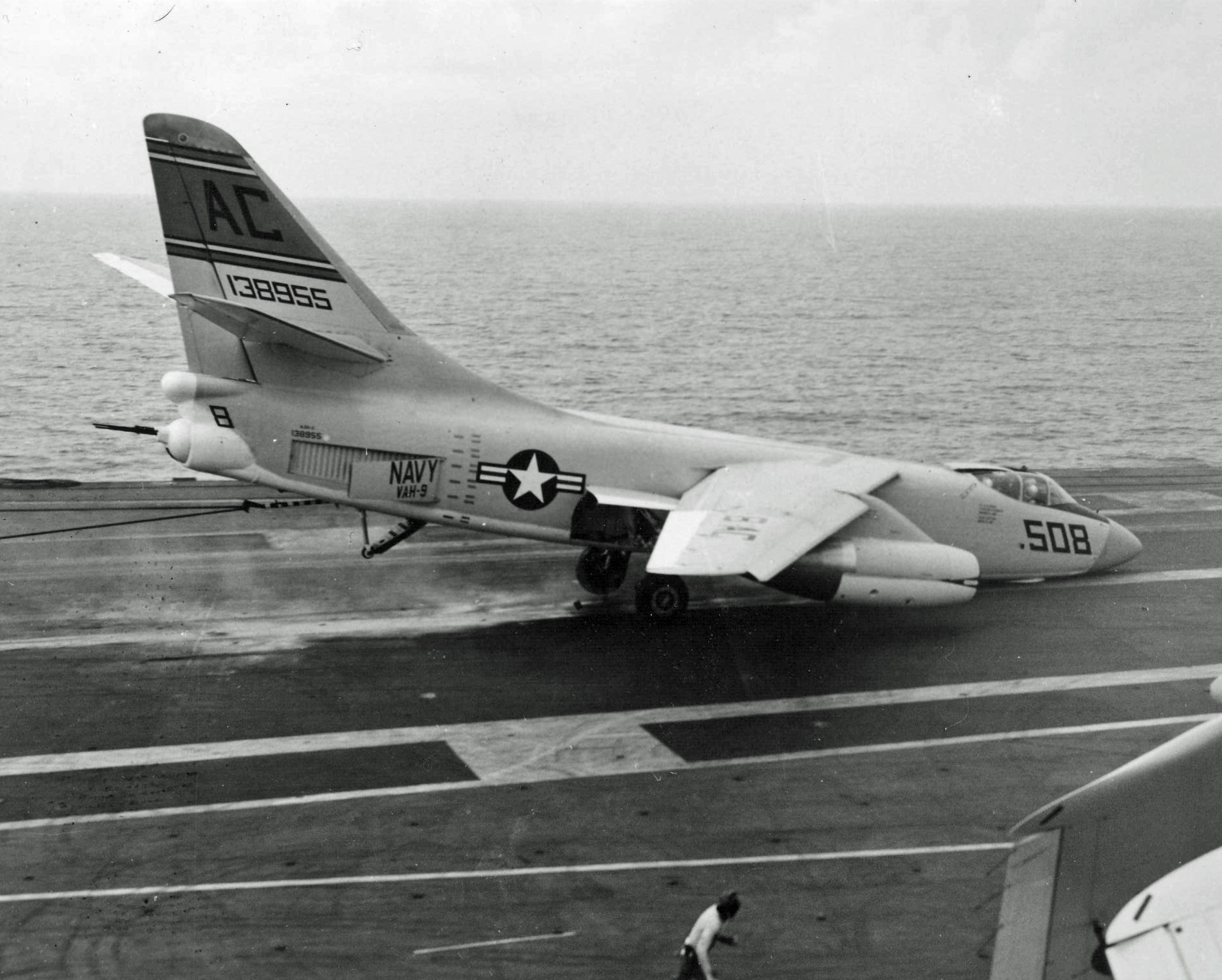
An A3D-2, BuNo 138955, from NAS Sanford-based Heavy Attack Squadron NINE (VAH-9) suffers a nose wheel collapse while landing aboard USS Saratoga (CVA-60), c. 1959-1960.

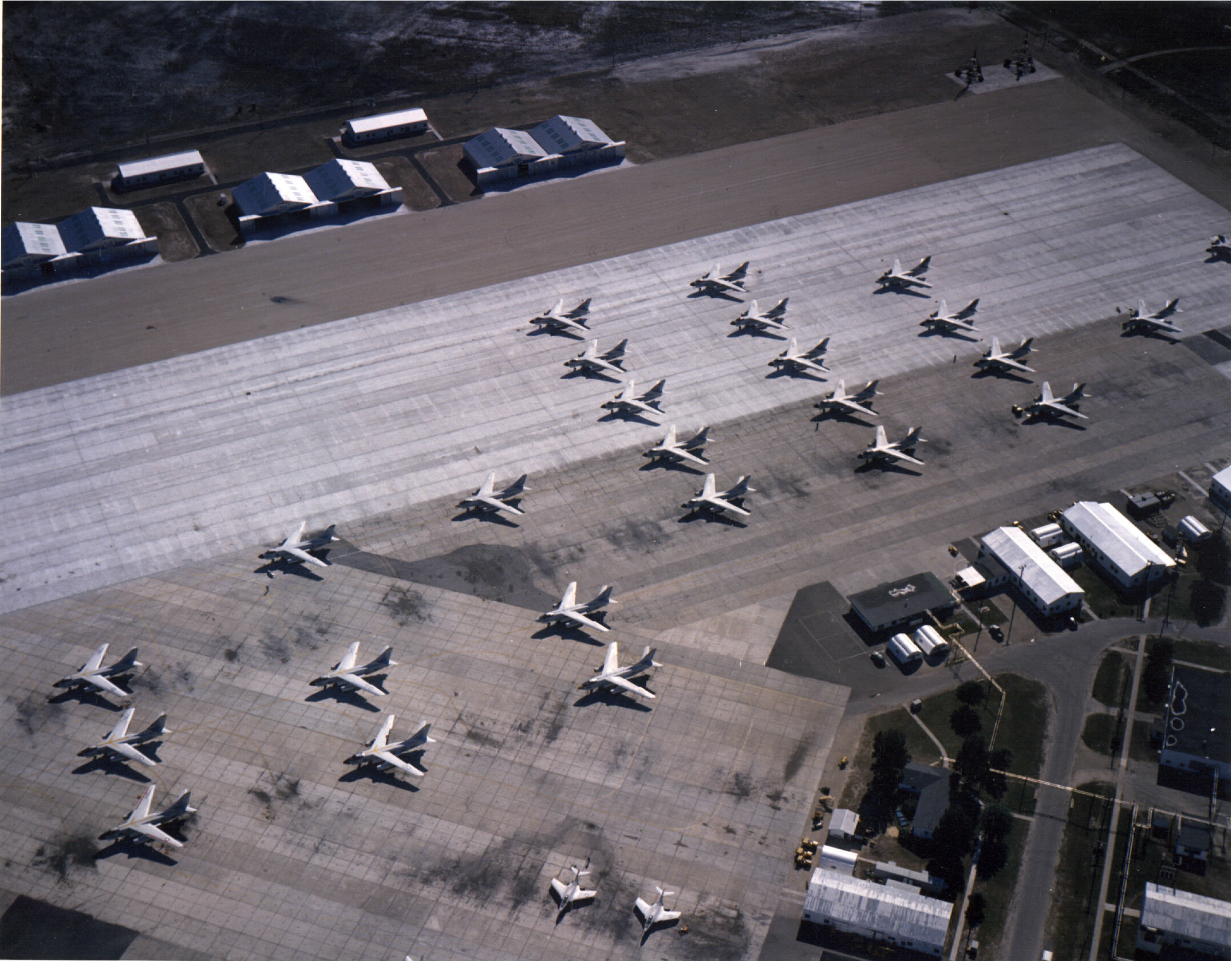
A3D-2 Skywarriors and F9F-8T Cougars of Heavy Attack Wing ONE (HATWING-1) on southwest ramp at NAS Sanford, circa 1960

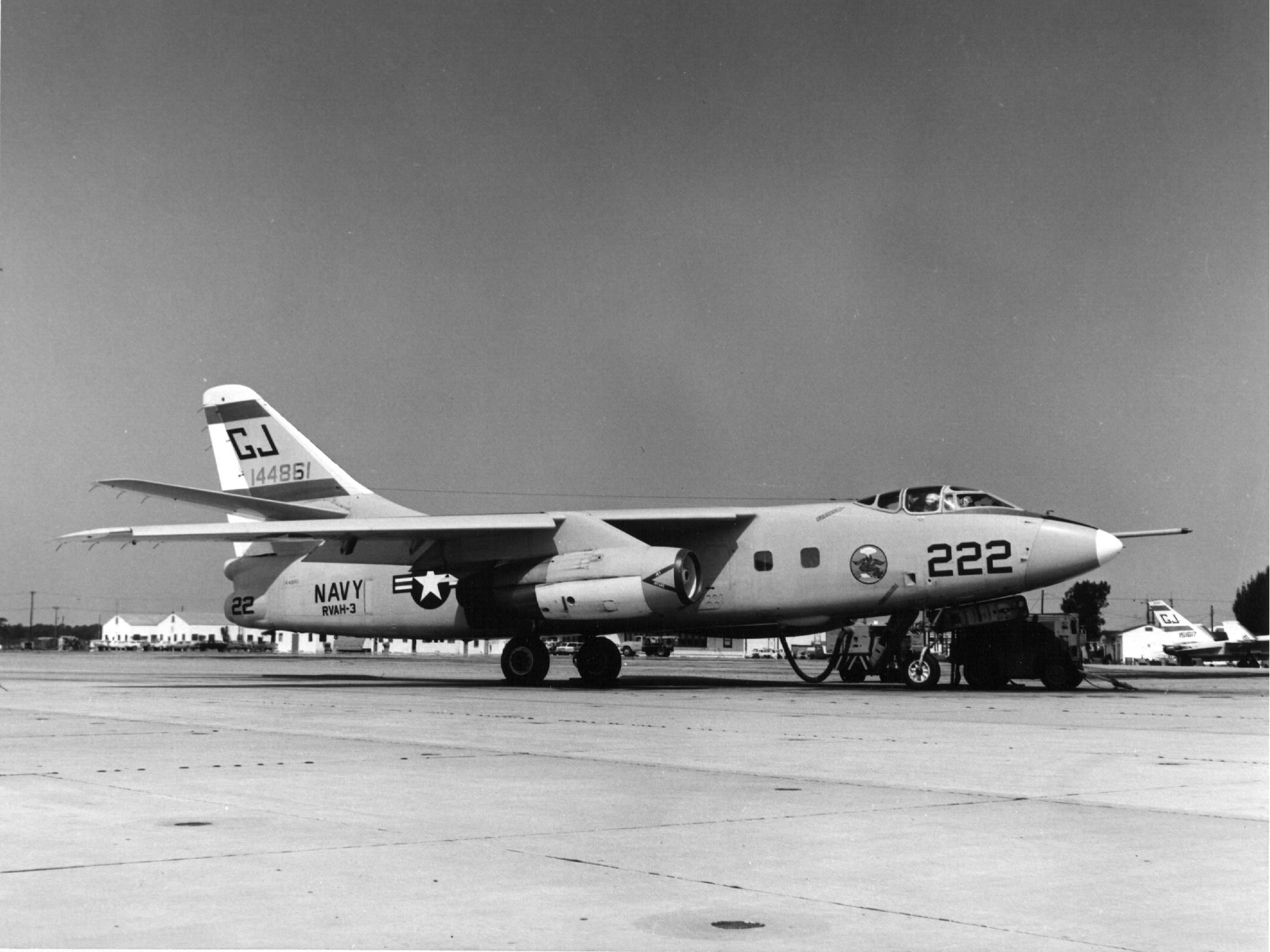
TA-3B Skywarrior, BuNo 144861, of Reconnaissance Attack Squadron THREE (RVAH-3) on the NAS Sanford southwest ramp, starting engines for a training sortie, circa 1967. RA-5C Vigilante, BuNo 151617, of RVAH-3 is visible in background.

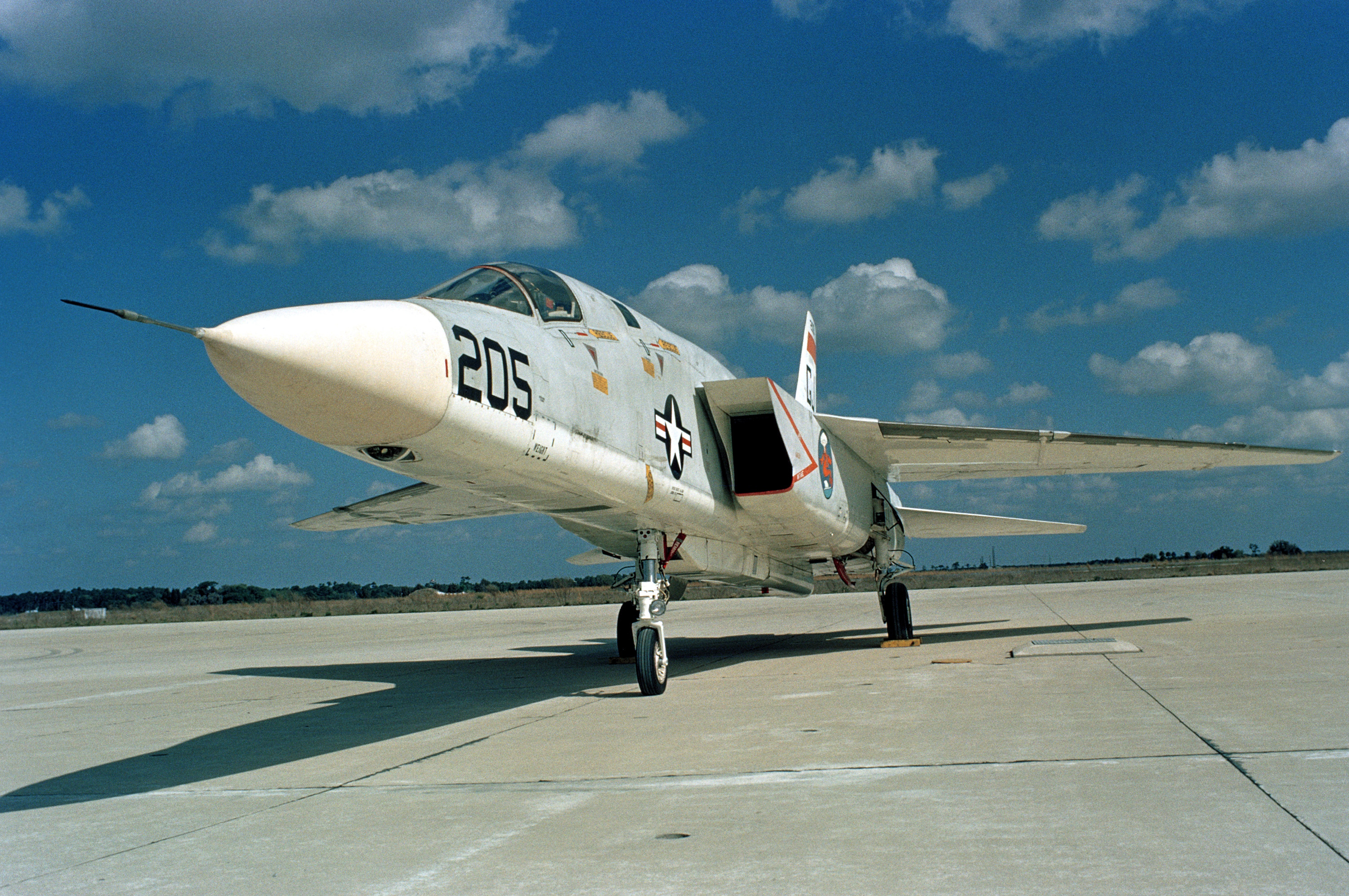
RA-5C Vigilante of RVAH-3 on NAS Sanford northeast ramp, circa 1968

In the early 1960s, the A3D aircraft (redesignated as the A-3B in 1962) began to be replaced by the Mach 2+ North American A3J Vigilante (redesignated the A-5A in 1962). But by 1964, the strategic nuclear strike mission for carrier-based aircraft was eliminated and the Navy's strategic nuclear strike mission under the SIOP was transferred to the Fleet Ballistic Missile (FBM) nuclear submarine force. As a result, all Vigilante squadrons were converted to a carrier-based tactical reconnaissance mission and redesignated as Reconnaissance Attack Squadrons (RVAH). Existing A-5A and A-5B aircraft were modified to the RA-5C Vigilante configuration and the North American production line shifted to producing all subsequent aircraft as RA-5Cs. Heavy Attack Wing ONE was renamed Reconnaissance Attack Wing ONE (RECONATKWING ONE) and its subordinate squadrons as Reconnaissance Attack Squadrons (RVAH). Unlike HATWING ONE, which concentrated on supplying aircraft squadrons to the Atlantic Fleet, RECONATKWING ONE would be the Navy's sole functional wing for the RA-5C and would supply squadrons to both the Atlantic Fleet and Pacific Fleet.

NAS Sanford-based squadrons routinely deployed aboard both Atlantic and Pacific Fleet aircraft carriers of the Forrestal, Kitty Hawk and Enterprise classes, seeing extensive action during the Cold War and the Vietnam War. Numerous RA-5C flight crews and aircraft were also lost to enemy action in the Vietnam War, with several NAS Sanford-based Naval Aviators and Naval Flight Officers becoming prisoners of war in Vietnam until repatriation in 1973. In addition to RA-5C aircraft, NAS Sanford also continued to operate the TA-3B variant of the Skywarrior, several examples of which were attached to the RA-5C Fleet Replacement Squadron (FRS), Reconnaissance Attack Squadron THREE (RVAH-3), for training Naval Flight Officers as Reconnaissance Attack Navigators (RAN) in the RA-5C. NAS Sanford also operated the R4D-8/C-117 Skytrain as an operational support aircraft assigned to the air station proper. Transient aircraft from NAS Key West, NAS Jacksonville and NAS Cecil Field, Florida and NAS Glynco, Georgia would also utilize NAS Sanford for training or as a weather or fuel divert from the Atlantic offshore training areas or the Navy's Pinecastle Bombing Range in the Ocala National Forest.

In late 1967, in addition to the nine existing RVAH squadrons that had previously been VAH squadrons, a tenth RVAH squadron was formed in preparation for the impending commissioning of the new aircraft carrier USS John F. Kennedy, culminating with the establishment of RVAH-14 on 1 February 1968.

Unfortunately, only a few months later, Congress directed the closure of NAS Sanford in 1968 due to funding constraints caused by the Vietnam War and President Lyndon Johnson's concurrent Great Society programs that necessitated the closure or realignment of several stateside air force bases and naval air stations as Department of Defense economy measures. As a result, flying operations rapidly scaled back at NAS Sanford during 1968 as the wing and squadrons were incrementally transferred to Turner AFB, a former Strategic Air Command B-52 and KC-135 installation, which was renamed as NAS Albany (Turner Field), Georgia. The Navy officially vacated NAS Sanford in 1969 and the installation was turned over to the City of Sanford.

With the later post-Vietnam closure of NAS Albany in 1975, RECONATKWING ONE and its squadrons subsequently relocated again, this time to NAS Key West, Florida, during the 1974–75 time frame and continued to deploy to both the Atlantic, Mediterranean and Pacific aboard Forrestal, Kitty Hawk, Enterprise and Nimitz-class aircraft carriers. RA-5C units remained operational at NAS Key West until the RA-5C's retirement from active naval service in January 1980.

A commemorative NAS Sanford Memorial Park, along with plaques and a retired RA-5C Vigilante aircraft on loan from the National Naval Aviation Museum were dedicated in May 2003 and are positioned on the main entrance road within the Orlando Sanford International Airport perimeter in memory to NAS Sanford personnel who served their country during World War II, the Korean War, the Vietnam War and the Cold War. Additional Seminole County historical markers were placed at both the park and at the main passenger terminal, while additional markers and memorials to NAS Sanford exist in the city's redeveloped RiverWalk riverfront area facing Lake Monroe in downtown Sanford.

A restored PV-1 Ventura, also on loan from the National Museum of Naval Aviation, was placed on display inside the airport's passenger terminal along with additional NAS Sanford historical displays in September 2020.

An A-3 Skywarrior has also been requested from the Navy for future restoration and display, but the paucity of remaining airframes not already on display elsewhere will make this a challenge.

Following base closure, the City of Sanford assumed control of the facility, initially developing it as an uncontrolled regional general aviation airport and adjacent industrial park, later reactivating the former Navy control tower as a non-federal control tower in 1972. This was later upgraded to an FAA-operated control tower in 1994. Today, the airfield operates as Orlando-Sanford International Airport, a commercial airport with domestic and international airline service, augmenting commercial service at nearby Orlando International Airport (the former McCoy AFB) and Daytona Beach International Airport (the former NAS Daytona Beach).

== Incidents and accidents ==
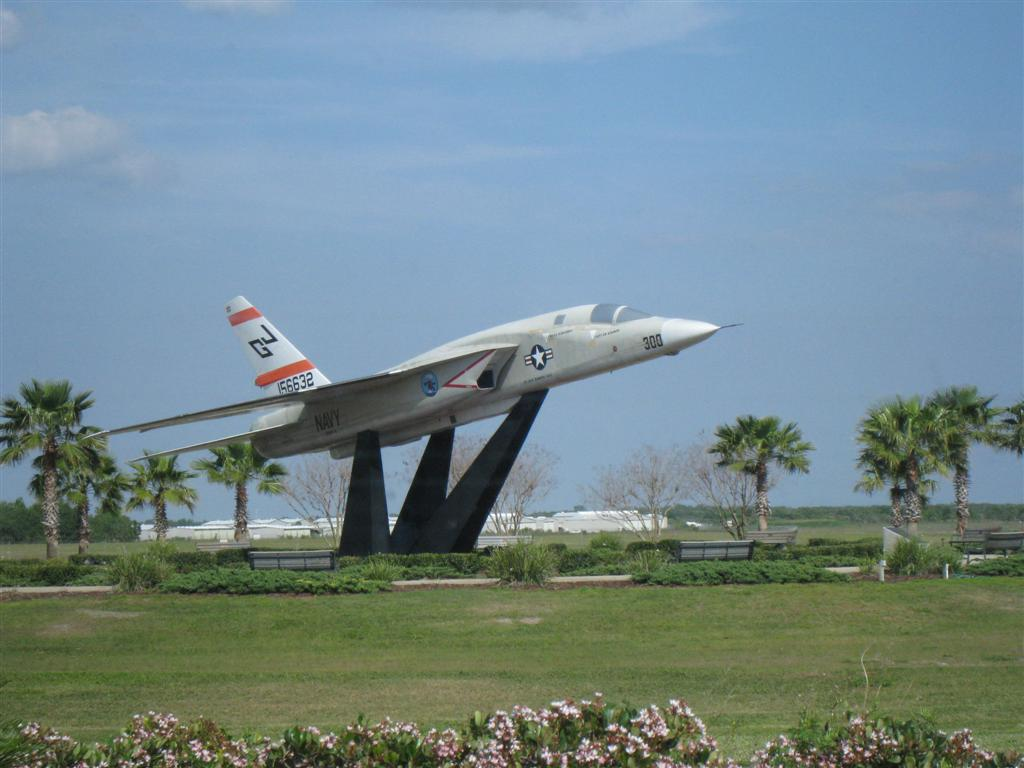
RA-5C Vigilante (BuNo 156632) in the markings of RVAH-3 on display at Orlando Sanford International Airport, the former NAS Sanford, circa 2008

- Numerous aircraft mishaps occurred during the World War II years, but detailed data is not readily available. In late 1970, wreckage of an FM-1 Wildcat was located by hunters near the south shore of nearby Lake Jessup. Subsequent contact with and investigation by USN authorities indicated that the pilot had safely bailed out of the aircraft during this circa 1944 mishap.
- On 27 Aug 1956, AJ-2, Bureau Number (BuNo) 130419, assigned to Heavy Attack Squadron SEVEN (VAH-7), lost an engine and crashed in a residential neighborhood near then-NAAS Sanford. Three crewmen in the VAH-7 aircraft and two civilians on the ground were killed instantly, with a third civilian succumbing to injuries two days later. The civilians, two adults and one child, were all members of the same family.
- In October 1961, A3D-2, BuNo 142663, assigned to Heavy Attack Squadron 5 (VAH-5), crashed near NAS Sanford following a mid-air collision with another A3D-2 (A-3B), BuNo 142648, assigned to Heavy Attack Squadron 11 (VAH-11). Six crewmen, four in the VAH-5 aircraft and two in the VAH-11 aircraft, were killed.
- On 15 January 1962, A3D-2 BuNo 142243, assigned to Heavy Attack Squadron 1 (VAH-1), crashed in Oviedo, Florida south of NAS Sanford following an in-flight emergency. Three crew members were killed and one crewmember parachuted to safety.
- On 27 November 1962, A-5A BuNo 148927, assigned to Heavy Attack Squadron 3 (VAH-3) was stricken at NAS Sanford after overrunning the west end of Runway 27.
- On 5 September 1963, A-5A BuNo 148930, assigned to VAH-3, crashes near New Smyrna Beach northeast of NAS Sanford. The pilot, LCDR Robert Lovelace and ADJ1 Charles Kelsey, eject. LCDR Lovelace survives but ADJ1 Kelsey is killed.
- On 3 September 1964, RA-5C BuNo 151616, assigned to Reconnaissance Heavy Attack Squadron 1 (RVAH-1), suffered complete hydraulic failure and crashed at NAS Sanford. Both crewmen, LCDR Bell and AMHC Pemberton, ejected.
- On 8 September 1964, RA-5C BuNo 149292, assigned to Reconnaissance Heavy Attack Squadron 3 (RVAH-3), crashed at NAS Sanford. Both crewmen, LCDR Moore and LTJG Haney, ejected.
- On 14 November 1964, RA-5C BuNo 149308, assigned to Reconnaissance Heavy Attack Squadron NINE (RVAH-9), crashed at NAS Sanford. Both crewmen, LCDR C.C. Smith, Jr., and ADJC Carolyers, ejected.
- On 23 December 1964, RA-5C BuNo 151821*, assigned to Reconnaissance Heavy Attack Squadron 13 (RVAH-13), crashed near DeBary, Florida after takeoff from NAS Sanford. Both crewmen ejected. The pilot, RVAH-13 Commanding Officer, CDR Corneilus V. Nolta, Jr., was killed; the navigator, LTJG Paul Stokes, survived.
  - *BuNo 151821 is a typographical error on p. 86 in reference source No. 12 indicated below. The actual BuNo for this RA-5C mishap aircraft was 151621. BuNo 151821 was a Grumman A-6A Intruder at the time of this mishap and was later reconfigured to a KA-6D standard.
- On 6 January 1965, RA-5C BuNo 148924, assigned to Reconnaissance Attack Squadron SEVEN (RVAH-7) crashed on landing and burned after overrunning the runway at NAS Sanford. The pilot, LT Michael D. Hornsby, died on 8 January 1965 from injuries received. The aircraft was stricken at NAS Sanford
- On 15 December 1965, RA-5C BuNo 150827, assigned to RVAH-3, crashed at NAS Sanford. Both crewmen, CDR McLain and LT Morgan, ejected.
- On 14 June 1967, RA-5C BuNo 149314, assigned to RVAH-3, crashed at NAS Sanford during Field Carrier Landing Practice (FCLP). During a touch-and-go landing, the aircraft sustained in-flight ingestion of a loose clamp into the starboard engine with subsequent foreign object damage (FOD) and fire. Both crewmen ejected. The pilot, CDR Charles Thomas Butler, was killed; the Naval Flight Officer/Reconnaissance Attack Navigator (NFO/RAN), ENS John B. Smith, survived.
- On 3 October 1967, RA-5C BuNo 149315, assigned to RVAH-3, crashed at NAS Sanford. The pilot, LCDR Scruggs, ejected; there was no NFO/RAN aboard.
