= Naval Air Station Albany =

United States Navy military airfield in Albany, Georgia

- Turner Field
- Albany, Georgia in the United States
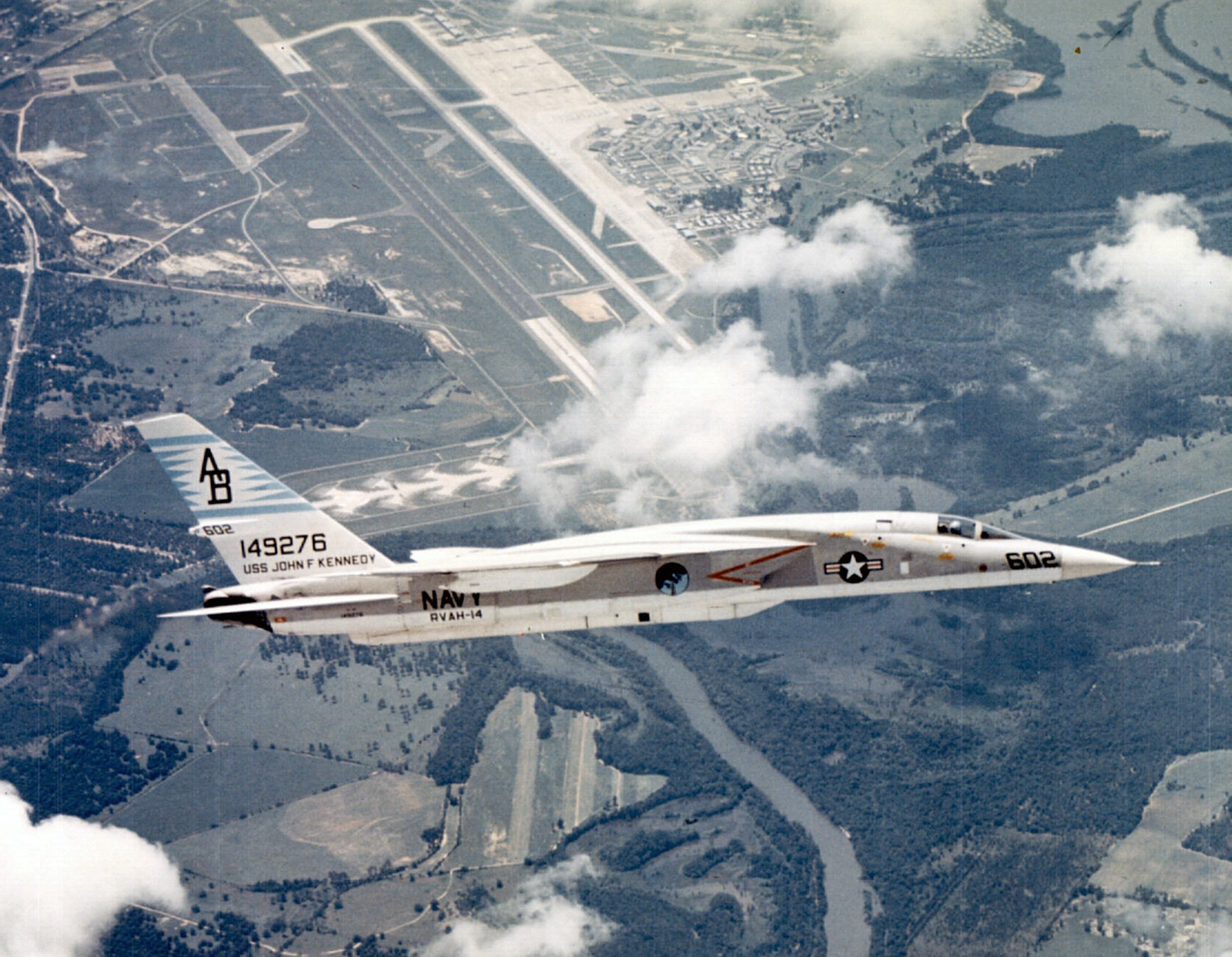
- A RA-5C Vigilante of Reconnaissance Attack (Heavy) Squadron 14 over NAS Albany in 1969

Site information
- Type: Naval air station
- Owner: Department of Defense
- Operator: US Navy
- Condition: Closed

Location
- Location in the United States
- Coordinates: 31.594°N 84.100°W

Site history
- Built: 1941
- In use: 1941 – 1946 (US Army Air Forces); 1947 – 1966 (US Air Force); 1966 – 1974 (US Navy)
- Fate: Redeveloped as a brewery in 1979 by Miller Brewing Company

Airfield information
Runways
Direction	Length and surface
	3,657.6 metres (12,000 ft)

Naval Air Station Albany (formerly Turner Air Force Base and Turner Field) is a former United States Air Force and United States Navy military airfield located in Albany, Georgia.

== History ==
=== Turner Field (1941–1946) ===
In mid-1940 the U.S. Army Air Corps approached the city of Albany about the possibility of building a training base near Albany. The city raised the necessary money and purchased 4,900 acres of land which was then leased to the Army for $51 a year. Construction of the base and airfield, named Air Corps Advanced Flying School, Albany by the United States Army Corps of Engineers began on 25 March 1941. On 21 July 1941, the field was named Turner Field in honor of Lt. Sullivan Turner, a Georgia native killed in a midair collision.

Once operational, Turner Field was used for acclimatization training (for foreign trainees) and advanced flight training as part of the 30th Flying Training Wing. Primary flight training in the Boeing-Stearman PT-17 Kaydet was done at Darr Aero Tech also in Albany. Under the Arnold Scheme some 5,000 Royal Air Force trainees were trained at Turner Field and Darr Aero Tech between 1941 and 1943. In 1944 Turner Field began training Free French Air Forces pilots to fly the North American B-25 Mitchell of which more than 100 were based at Turner Field.

Turner Field was deactivated on 15 August 1946 and maintained in caretaker status.

=== Turner Air Force Base (1947–1966) ===
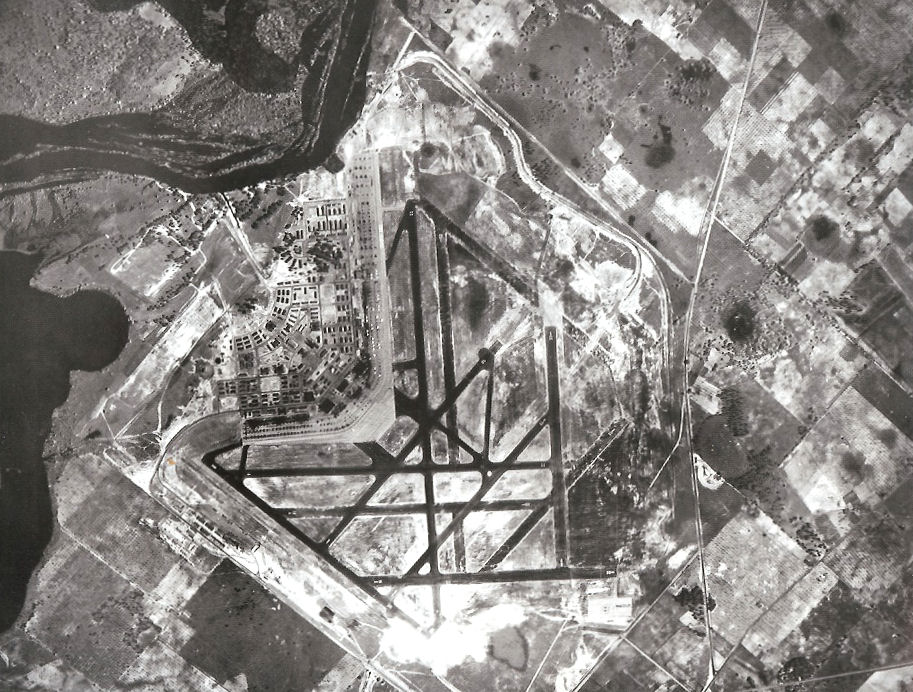
Turner Army Airfield, about 1947 still in its World War II configuration

On 1 April 1947, the airfield was reactivated. On 13 January 1948, it was renamed Turner Air Force Base.

On 20 November 1947 the 31st Tactical Fighter Wing equipped with North American F-51 Mustangs moved there from Langley Field and would remain there until 25 August 1948.

In 1950 the base was transferred from Continental Air Command (CAC) to Strategic Air Command (SAC).

The 40th Air Division was based at Turner from 14 March 1951 to 1 April 1957.

The 508th Fighter-Escort Wing (later renamed the 508th Strategic Fighter Wing) was based at Turner from July 1952 until 11 May 1956.

The 4080th Strategic Reconnaissance Wing was established at Turner in May 1956 and based there until 1 April 1957.

The base was transferred from SAC to Tactical Air Command (TAC) in 1957 when SAC gave up its escort mission, however, the base would be returned to SAC on 1 January 1959 when the 822d Air Division was established there on 1 January 1959. The 822nd Air Division would remain at Turner until it was inactivated on 2 September 1966. One of the component units of the 822nd Air Division was the 4138th Strategic Wing which was activated at Turner and received its first combat aircraft when the 336th Bombardment Squadron, equipped with 15 B-52 Stratofortresses moved to Turner from Biggs AFB, Texas. In February 1963, the 4138th Strategic Wing and 336th Bombardment Squadron were inactivated and the 484th Bombardment Wing was activated at Turner to assume the mission, aircraft, personnel and equipment of the 4138th wing.

In December 1965 it was announced that Turner Air Force Base would be closed.

=== Naval Air Station Albany (1967–1974) ===
The base was recommissioned as Naval Air Station Albany on 1 July 1967.

With the impending closure of Naval Air Station Sanford, Reconnaissance Attack Wing One moved to NAS Albany and it became the main operational base for the Navy's North American RA-5C Vigilante until 1974 when operations were moved to NAS Key West, Florida.

=== Miller Brewing Company (1979–present) ===
In 1979 the Miller Brewing Company purchased part of the former base as a site for a new brewery.
