= AV =

AV, Av or A.V. may refer to:

== Arts and entertainment ==
- The abbreviation of audiovisual, possessing both a sound and a visual component
- Av or Avrom Isaacs (1926–2016), Canadian art dealer
- Av Westin (1929–2022), American television producer
- AV Prafullachandra, Indian music composer
- Amusement Vision, the former name of Ryu Ga Gotoku Studio

=== Movies ===
- A.V. (film), a 2005 Hong Kong film directed by Pang Ho-Cheung
- Adult video, an alternative name/synonym of a pornographic film
- AV The Hunt, a 2020 Turkish thriller film directed by Emre Akay
- Arun Vijay (born 1977), Indian actor

== Places ==
- Anguilla (FIPS country code and obsolete NATO diagram AV)
- Antelope Valley, a valley in Southern California
- Province of Avellino, a province of Italy

== Politics ==
- Av or Avrum Gross (1936–2018), American lawyer and Attorney General of Alaska
- America Votes, an American 501(c)4 organization that promotes progressive causes
- Anonymous for the Voiceless, a grassroots animal rights organization specializing in street activism
- Alternative vote, an electoral system used to elect a single winner from a field of more than two candidates
- Approval voting, a non-ranking vote system

== Science and technology ==
=== Anatomy and medicine ===
- Aerobic vaginitis, vaginal infection associated with overgrowth of aerobic bacteria
- Arteriovenous (disambiguation)
- Atrioventricular (disambiguation)

=== Electronics and computing ===
- Access violation, a computer software error
- Age verification, system for checking a user's age
- Antivirus software, used to prevent, detect and remove malicious software
- Audio and video connector, a cable between two devices
- Analog video
- AV Linux, a Linux-based operating system
- Avaya, a technology company formerly listed on the New York Stock Exchange with symbol "AV"

=== Fluid dynamics ===
- Annular velocity, speed of the drilling fluid's movement in a column called an annulus in oil wells
- Apparent viscosity, shear stress divided by shear rate

=== Other uses in science and technology ===
- A-type main-sequence star, in astronomy, abbreviated A V
- Aperture value mode, setting on photo cameras that allows to choose a specific aperture value

== Transportation ==
- Av. or Ave, an abbreviation for Avenue (landscape)
- Ambulance Victoria, an ambulance service operated in the Australian state of Victoria
- AV (cyclecar), a British cyclecar manufactured between 1919 and 1924
- Autonomous vehicles
- Bavarian A V, an 1853 steam locomotive model
- Avianca (IATA airline code AV)
- Aviation, abbreviated Av in military use
- A US Navy hull classification symbol: Seaplane tender (AV)
- AeroVironment, manufacturer of unmanned military aircraft and systems

== Other uses ==
- Authorised Version of the Bible (also known as King James Version)
- Av (month), a month in the Hebrew calendar
- av, the Avar language's ISO 639-1 code
- Ꜹ or AV from Latin aurum (avrvm), a numismatic abbreviation for "gold"
- A.V., the putative mark of ébéniste Adam Weisweiler
- AV Akademikerverlag GmbH & Co. KG an imprint of the German group VDM Publishing (now OmniScriptum)
- Andhra Vidyalaya College, aka A. V. College, a school in Hyderabad, India
- Aston Villa F.C., an English professional football club
- Aviva, British insurance company, listed on the New York Stock Exchange and London Stock Exchange as "AV"

== See also ==
- 2023 AV, an asteroid that passed closed to the Earth in 2023
- A5 (disambiguation)
- α5 (disambiguation)
- AV idol, a type of Japanese porn star
