= A5 =

A5 and variants may refer to:

== Science and technology ==
=== Biology and medicine ===
- A5 regulatory sequence in biochemistry
- Androgen Androstenediol (abbreviation "A5")
- Annexin A5, a human cellular protein
- ATC code A05 Bile and liver therapy, a subgroup of the Anatomical Therapeutic Chemical Classification System
- British NVC community A5 (Ceratophyllum demersum community), a British Isles plants community
- Subfamily A5, a Rhodopsin-like receptors subfamily
- Noradrenergic cell group A5, a noradrenergic cell group located in the Pons
- A5 pod, a name given to a group of orcas (Orcinus orca) found off the coast of British Columbia, Canada

=== Computing ===
- Apple A5, the Apple mobile microprocessor
- ARM Cortex-A5, ARM applications processor

=== Other uses in science and technology ===
- A5, the strain at fracture of a material as measured with a load test on a cylindrical body of length 5 times its diameter
- A_{5}, the alternating group on five elements
- Zeolite A-5, a calcium-type molecular sieve also known as 5A
- Lely (company) Astronaut A5 and A5 Next, the fifth version of the Astronaut robot manufactured by Lely

== Sport and recreation ==
- A5 (classification), an amputee sport classification
- A5 grade (climbing)
- A5, an aid climbing gear manufacturer - absorbed by The North Face
- A05, Réti Opening Encyclopaedia of Chess Openings code
- A-5, a common shorthand name for the Browning Auto-5 shotgun
- Gibson A-5 mandolin, a Gibson mandolin
- Tippmann A-5, a semi-automatic pneumatic marker for playing paintball

== Transport ==
=== Automobiles ===
- Arrows A5, a 1982 British Formula One racing car
- Audi A5, a 2007–present German compact executive car
- Chery A5, a 2006–2010 Chinese compact sedan
- Soueast A5, a 2018–2023 Chinese compact sedan
- Sehol A5, a 2019–present Chinese compact sedan, formerly JAC Jiayue A5

=== Other uses in transportation ===
- A5 road, in several countries
- Hall-Scott A-5, an engine powering the 1916 Standard H-2 aircraft
- Prussian A 5, a 1913 German railbus
- Route A5 (WMATA), a bus route operated by the Washington Metropolitan Area Transit Authority
- Airlinair, by IATA code
- Bhutan, by aircraft registration code
- ICON A5, an American amphibious aircraft
- Pennsylvania Railroad class A5s, an American locomotive
- Finnish Steam Locomotive Class A5
- LNER Class A5, a class of 4-6-2T steam locomotives

== Military ==
=== Aircraft ===
- A-5, an export version of Nanchang Q-5, a Chinese-built jet fighter bomber
- Curtiss Falcon or A-5 Falcon, an attack aircraft manufactured by the Curtiss Aircraft Company
- Mitsubishi A5M, a 1930s Japanese fighter plane
- A-5 Vigilante, a carrier-based supersonic bomber designed for the US Navy
- Focke-Wulf A 5, a World War I German Focke-Wulf aircraft
- Sturzkampfgeschwader 1, from its historic Geschwaderkennung code with the Luftwaffe in World War II

=== Other uses in military ===
- USS A-5 (SS-6) or USS Pike (SS-6), a 1903 US Navy Plunger-class submarine
- HMS A5, an A-class submarine of the Royal Navy
- Aggregate 5, a German rocket design, scaled down precursor to the V-2, in World War II
- A 5, a Swedish regiment designation; see list of Swedish artillery regiments
- A5, the staff designation for air force headquarters staff concerned with plans or strategy
  - In the UK, the Joint Force Air Component Headquarters A5 - Air Strategy and GAT branch

== Other uses ==
- A5 paper size, an ISO 216 international standard paper size (148 × 210 mm)
- A5, the highest grade of Japanese wagyu beef
- In Town and country planning in the United Kingdom, A5 is the code for permission to use specific land or premises for takeaways
- A5 Juggernaut, an armored fighting vehicle in the Star Wars fictional universe

== See also ==
- A5/1, A5/2 and A5/3, ciphers used in cellular phones
- AV (disambiguation)
- Alpha 5 (disambiguation) (α5 / Α5)
- 5A (disambiguation)
