= VC-7 Squadron =

Heavy Attack Composite Squadron VC-7
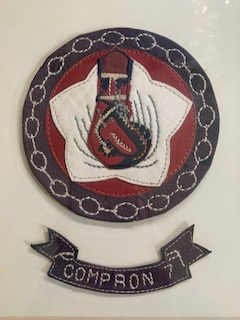
- Active: Commissioned August 10, 1950, redesignated VAH-7 November 1, 1955
- Country: United States
- Branch: U. S. Navy
- Role: Nuclear Weapons Delivery
- Nickname: "The Sunday Punch"

Composite Squadron Seven (VC-7) was a carrier type Heavy Attack squadron. The squadron was commissioned at the United States Naval Air station, Moffett Field, California on August 10, 1950. Composite Squadron Seven was the second squadron in Heavy Attack Wing One. The VC designation indicated that this was a composite squadron. In 1955, VC-7 was redesignated VAH-7. The VAH designation was given to heavy attack units which had also been composite squadrons. Like the VC units, the purpose of the VAH units was to deliver nuclear weapons.

== The Heavy Attack Squadrons ==
After the end of World War II, the different branches of the U. S. military struggled to secure funding and define the roles and missions of each branch. The National Security Act of 1947 created the Air Force as a separate branch of the military. Some military leaders felt that the Navy should serve only in a support role to the Air Force. The plan was to limit the size of the Navy, mothball numerous naval vessel, and greatly limit all aspects of naval aviation. The Navy set out to prove the importance of being able to launch long range nuclear missions from existing aircraft carriers. Existing aircraft were used to prove that long range nuclear bombers could be launched from though not landed on aircraft carriers. At this point, VC-5, VC-6 and VC-7 were formed as heavy attack composite squadrons. The squadrons were eventually supplied with the North American AJ-1 aircraft. The squadrons proved that planes carrying nuclear weapons could be launched from aircraft carriers and thus carry out long range nuclear missions.

== Commissioning and NAS Moffett Field Operations ==
When it was commissioned, in August, 1950, Composite Squadron 7 (VC-7) was one of three carrier type Heavy Attack Squadrons. At the time it was the only Heavy Attack Squadron on the west coast. The squadron was initially equipped with P2V-3C and AD aircraft. The first commander of VC-7 was E. J. McConnell. There were several leadership changes during the early days of the squadron On October 11, 1950, Commander Henry L. Miller relieved Commander McConnell. Joseph A. Jaap relieved Commander Miller on October 30, 1950. Plank owner certificates were issued to the personnel who were assigned to the squadron on or before the date on which Captain Jaap took command.

== Insignia ==
After plank certificates were issued, the Commanding Officer asked for a committee to create a squadron insignia. The design created by Lt. Commander Libbey was chosen as the insignia for VC-7. The insignia shows VC-7 as "The Sunday Punch". The squadron history describes the insignia with the following details. "The insignia incorporates the blue of the ocean from which the Navy originates, and flame red which is the enemy's view of successful accomplishment of our purpose. These colors are arranged around the traditional white star of aviation. The center motif, a clenched fist in a boxing glove, symbolizes a knock out blow delivered in fair context. The border device, a non-fouling chain, relates to the parent service, the Navy. The endless arrangement of the chain symbolizes teamwork between individual members of the squadron: 'On the strength of one link of the chain dependeth the might of the chain. Who knows when thou mayest be tested, so live that thou bearest the strain.'"

== NAS Norfolk and NAS Oceana ==
In June, 1951, VC-7 was moved from Moffett Field to NAS Norfolk, Virginia. The squadron received their first AJ-1 in September, 1951. The AJ-1 was the Navy's first bomber capable of carrying an atomic weapon. AJ-1 operations began in November, 1951. In December, Commander Jaap and Commander McConnell each completed four landings on the USS Midway. These landings made Japp and McConnell VC-7's first carrier qualified AJ-1 pilots. Commander McConnell also became commander of the squadron that December. The squadron was moved from NAS Norfolk to NAS Oceana in December, 1951. While stationed at Oceana, VC-7 pilots completed carrier qualifications by landing their AJ-1s on the USS Wasp which was located near Jacksonville, Florida.

== Port Lyautey ==
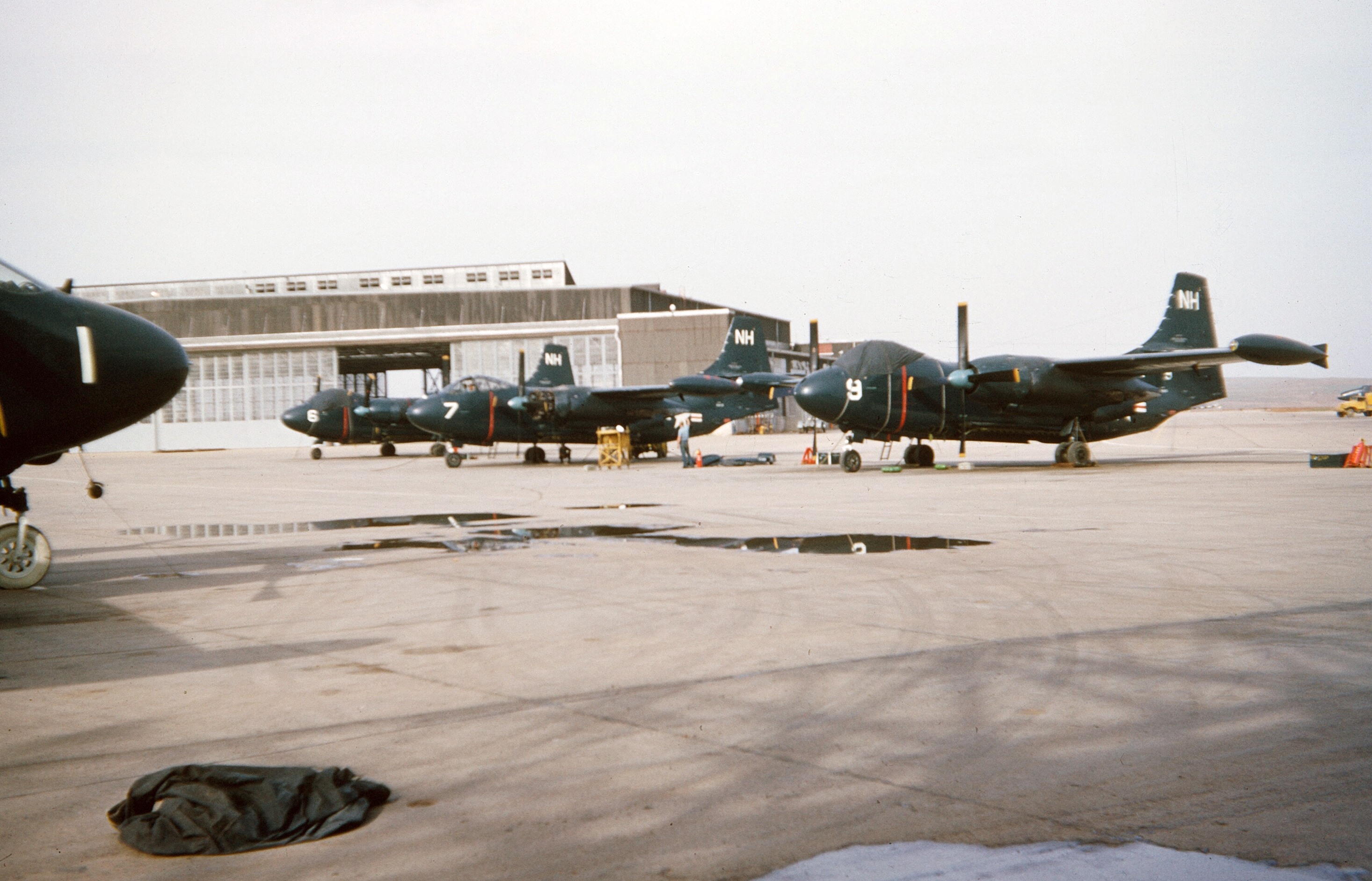
Aircraft used by squadron VC-7 while at Port Lyautey

In April, 1952, VC-7 was deployed to NAF Port Lyautey, French Morocco. They arrived for a six-month deployment, relieving VC-6. The squadron was involved in many operations with the U.S. Sixth Fleet while in Port Lyautey. During the initial deployment they operated with the USS Coral Sea and the USS Wasp. During the first deployment while operating off the carriers of the Sixth Fleet, CMR E. J. McConnell, C. Sprague and W. D. Mathews disappeared while on a simulated night attack mission of Italy. VC-7 was again deployed to Port Lyautey in late 1953 continuing into 1954. The squadron was equipped with the AJ-2 Savage during this deployment. NH was the designation used on the tail of the plane to indicate it belonged to VC-7.

== NAS Patuxent River ==
The first deployment to Port Lyautey ended in September 1952. Not long after their return from Morocco, the squadron was moved to NAS Patuxent River. "The Tester", a publication of NAS Patuxent River, in its January 28, 1955 issue described the mission of VC-7 in this way: "Operating under the direction of Commander Heavy Attack Wing One and Commander Air Force, Atlantic Fleet, VC-7 is one of several AJ squadrons poised to carry out our country's threat to retaliate in the event of enemy attack. While deployed, the Heavy Attack Wing Squadrons form the "Sunday Punch" of the powerful U. S. Sixth Fleet." "The Tester" also noted that the work of VC-7 was highly classified. There were stringent security regulations as evidenced by the barbed wire fence and the Marine Guard that was assigned to Hangar 305 at Patuxent River. Because of the classified work of the squadron, the men of VC-7 were handpicked and passed a background check. Their mission was recognized as a vital one. During the Cold War, VC-7 was one of the units that provided a deterrent force in the Mediterranean and in Europe.

== Aircraft ==
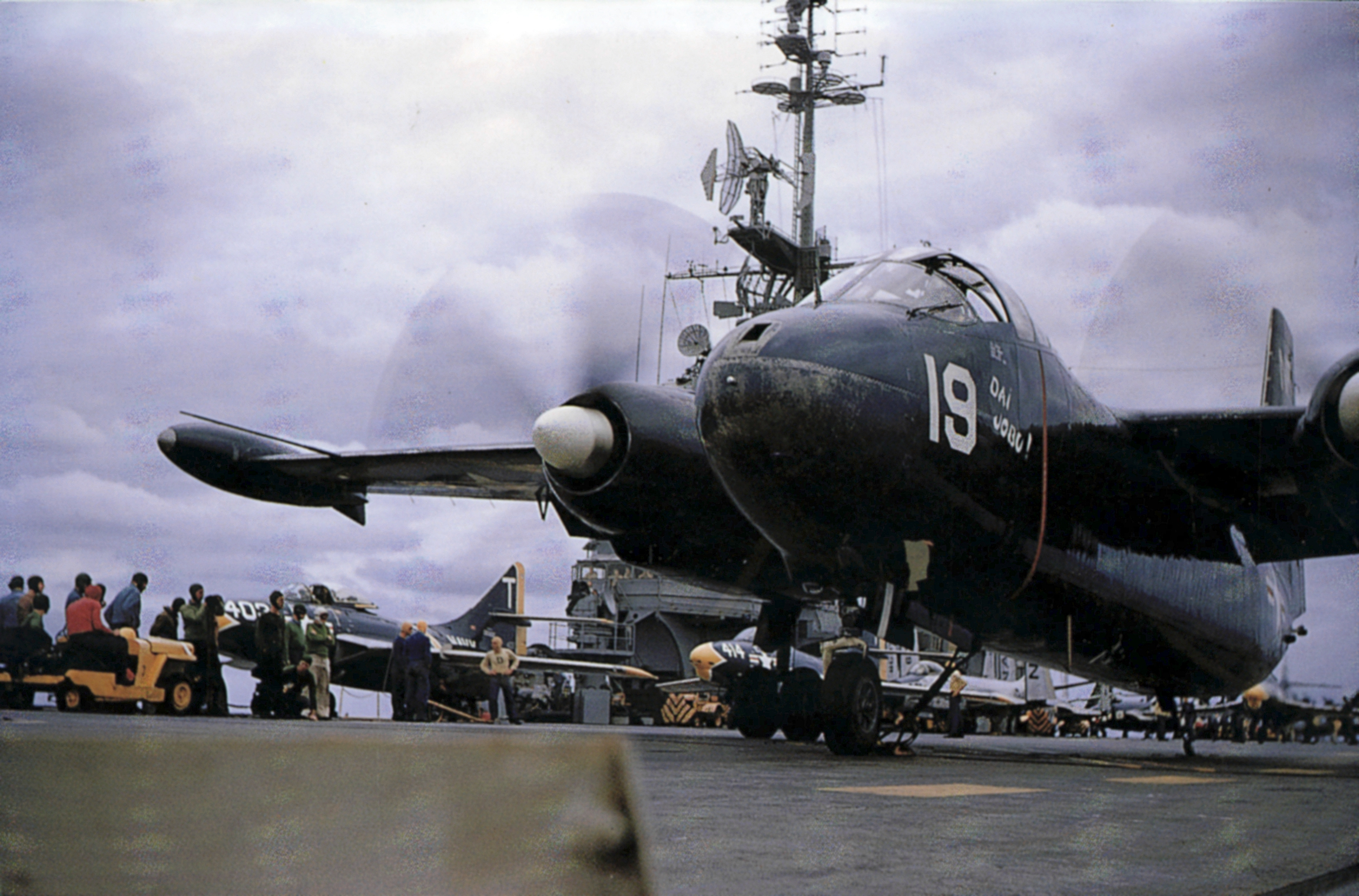
AJ Savage launching from USS Midway (CVA-41) 1955

VC-7 operations initially began with P2Vs. These were later replaced by P2V-3Cs. In November, 1951, VC-7 commenced AJ-1 operations. The AJ-1 was the Navy's first aircraft capable of carrying an atomic bomb. Unlike the P2V, the AJ was designed for carrier landings. Initially, due to the size and weight of the AJ, the only carriers capable of operating with that aircraft were the three Midway class carriers. Later the Essex class carriers, the first of which was the Oriskany, were also able to adapt to AJ operations. Carrier crews and captains often disliked the AJ because of its size. VC-7 eventually carried out operations with the AJ-2 Savage. The AJ was a special plane to the men of VC-7. "The Tester" reported ". . . the AJ pilots are uniquely united in their praise of the AJ as a carrier plane. The visibility is excellent, and its controllability and rock steadiness in the approach are remarkable. The only drawback is the fact that with the unusual size and weight of the aircraft, you must be just right at the 'cut'. There is no room for minor errors in speed, altitude or attitude when trying to put the AJ aboard a carrier even in the calmest of seas.

== NAS Sanford VAH-1 ==
On November 1, 1955, Composite Squadron Seven VC-7 was re-designated as Heavy Attack Squadron Seven VAH-7. The squadron was moved to NAS Sanford, Florida that same year. It was at Sanford that the squadron suffered its second fatal crash. The special dedication of the men of the squadron was also exhibited by that crew. Knowing that the plane was going down, the pilot tried valiantly to move his crashing plane away from homes in order to minimize civilian deaths. O. D. Hall, G. M. O'Hara and W. V. Swigonski were killed in the crash.

The squadron was redesignated again on December 1, 1964. At that time it became RVAH-7. The mission of the squadron changed with the designation change. It was not longer a squadron designed to deliver nuclear weapons. As shown by its squadron insignia, RVAH-7 was a photo reconnaissance squadron.
