= Atrioventricular =

Atrioventricular (having to do with an atrium and ventricle) can refer to:

- Left atrioventricular opening
- Atrioventricular fistula
- Atrioventricular node
- Atrioventricular valves, the mitral valve and tricuspid valve
