= 5A =

5A may refer to:

- AAAAA Tourist Attractions of China (5A), tourist attractions in the highest official rating category in the People's Republic of China
- Alpine Air Express IATA airline designator
- Vermont Route 5A
- New York State Route 5A
- British Columbia Highway 5A
- Florida State Road 5A
- GCR Class 5A, a class of British 0-6-0T steam locomotive
- 5A (drum stick), the most general purpose stick
- RTS-5A, a former South Australian television station (now WIN SA)
- Libya (aircraft registration prefix 5A)
- Zeolite 5A, a calcium-type molecular sieve.

== See also ==
- A5 (disambiguation)
