= 2023 AV =

Asteroid

Discovery
- Discovered by: Catalina Sky Survey
- Discovery site: Catalina Stn.
- Discovery date: 13 January 2023

Designations
- Minor planet category: NEO · Apollo

Orbital characteristics
- Epoch 25 February 2023 (JD 2460000.5) (Post-flyby orbit)
- Uncertainty parameter 7
- Observation arc: 17.9 hr
- Aphelion: 1.583 AU
- Perihelion: 0.683 AU
- Semi-major axis: 1.133 AU
- Eccentricity: 0.3972
- Orbital period (sidereal): 1.21 yr (440.5 days)
- Mean anomaly: 84.426°
- Mean motion: 0° 49^{m} 2.444^{s} / day
- Inclination: 10.649°
- Longitude of ascending node: 112.023°
- Time of perihelion: 3 November 2022 @ 0.54AU
- Argument of perihelion: 265.681°
- Earth MOID: 0.000146 AU (21,800 km; 0.057 LD)

Physical characteristics
- Mean diameter: 2-5 meters (CNEOS)
- Absolute magnitude (H): 30.587±0.365 · 30.66

2023 AV is a near-Earth object that passed 15,551 ± 400 km (9,663 ± 249 mi) from the centerpoint of Earth around 12 January 2023 20:09 ± 00:05 UT. Since Earth has a radius of about 6,400 km (4,000 mi), it passed about 9,200 km (5,700 mi) from the surface of Earth. The asteroid is about 2–5 meters in diameter. The asteroid came to perihelion (closest approach to the Sun) on 3 November 2022 and approached Earth from the direction of the Sun. It was first imaged by the Catalina Sky Survey on 13 January 2023 04:56, nine hours after closest approach. It was confirmed via the Near-Earth Object Confirmation Page and publicly announced by the Minor Planet Center 42.5 hours after closest approach or about 34 hours after the first image. An impact by this object would have been similar to 2008 TC3.

2023 AV Closest Earth Approach on 2023-Jan-12 20:09 UT
| Date & time of closest approach | Earth distance (AU) | Sun distance (AU) | Velocity wrt Earth (km/s) | Velocity wrt Sun (km/s) | Uncertainty region (3-sigma) | Reference |
|---|---|---|---|---|---|---|
| 2023-01-12 20:09 ± 00:05 | 0.000104 AU (15,560 km; 0.04047 LD) | 0.983 AU (147.1 million km; 383 LD) | 15.0 | 30.9 | ± 400 km | Horizons |

The 2023 Earth approach lifted the orbit and increased the orbital period from 314 days to 440 days. This changed it from an Aten asteroid to an Apollo asteroid.

Orbital Elements
| Parameter | Epoch | Period (p) | Aphelion (Q) | Perihelion (q) | Semi-major axis (a) | Eccentricity (e) | Inclination (i) |
| Units | | (days) | AU | | | | (°) |
|---|---|---|---|---|---|---|---|
| Pre-flyby | 2022-Oct-25 | 314.2 | 1.265 | 0.544 | 0.904 | 0.3983 | 12.34° |
| Post-flyby | 2023-Feb-25 | 440.5 | 1.583 | 0.683 | 1.133 | 0.3972 | 10.65° |
