= Atrioventricular fistula =

Medical condition of the heart

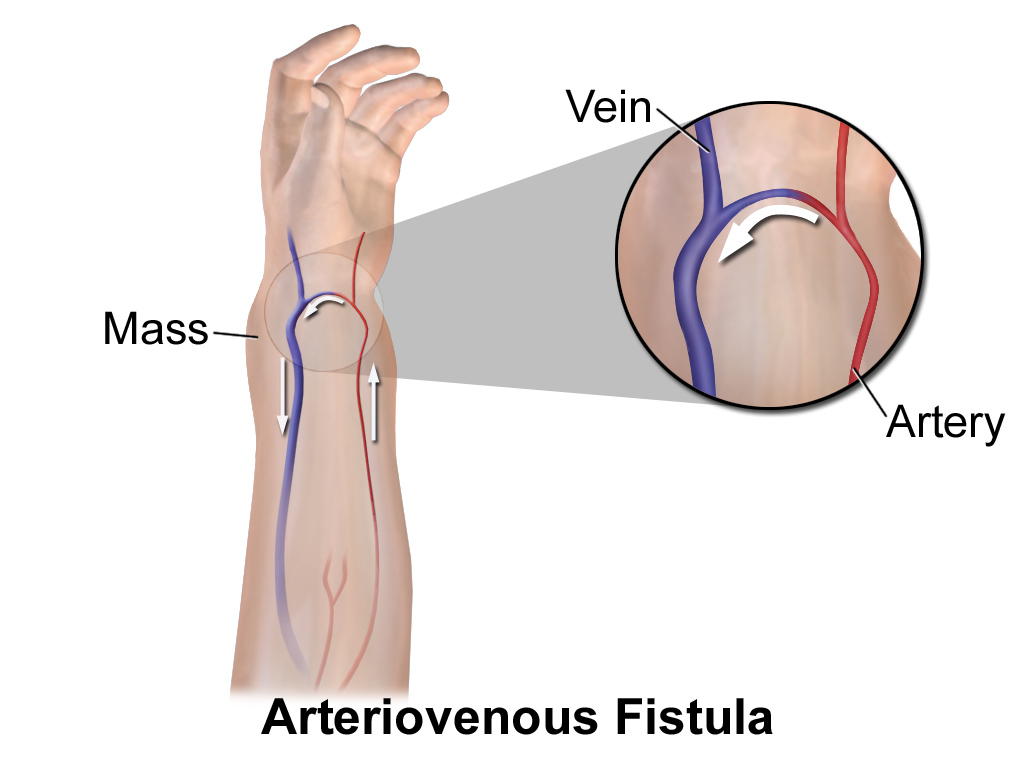
Arterial venous connection in AVF

An atrioventricular fistula is a fistula between an atrium and a ventricle of the heart. Formation of an AVF is a potential complication of catheter ablation.

Atrioventricular fistulas are also described as atypical connections between an artery and a vein within the human cardiovascular system. There are two forms of AV fistulas: congenital and acquired. Many people with congenital AV fistulas are unaware until they become symptomatic. Symptoms that may present are further explained below. AV fistulas may remain benign but can become sites of abnormal bleeding or of blood flow blockages. Acquired AV fistulas are most commonly associated with a previous history of trauma, including surgery to that area, but are also created via surgery in patients who require regular hemodialysis.

== History of AVF ==
AVF is most commonly seen after experiencing trauma compared to the congenital type. They were commonly seen in the extremities of soldiers coming back from war. Earliest documented AVF finding was in 1757 described by William Hunter.

Acquired AVF

After trauma, most usually a penetrating type, AV fistulas may be created during the regeneration process that the arteries and veins go through on their own. Most acquired AVF from trauma are identified within a week of the injury, but some may go unnoticed for a longer time, depending on size and severity.

Other types of acquired AVF includes AVF obtained via surgery for hemodialysis. These fistulas can be created using the cephalic and basilic veins and the radial and brachial arteries. The most common fistulas are the radio-cephalic AVFs.

Dialysis catheters are recommended for patients with End-Stage Renal Disease that need long-term dialysis. The KDOQI (Kidney Disease Outcomes Quality Initiative) has created the "Rule of 6" which includes various measurements such as flow volume > 600ml/min, vein diameter > 6mm, and vein depth > 6mm to determine if the created fistula is adequate for appropriate use.

Congenital AVF

Congenital AVFs are rare but have been associated with certain disorders such as fibromuscular dysplasia, neurofibromatosis, and some other collagen type disorders.

Symptoms

AVF may form anywhere in the body, and the presenting symptoms depend on the AVF’s location and size. One may feel a vibrating buzz (may be described as a “thrill” or “bruit”) on the skin surface above the AVF. AVF in the extremities can also cause chronic venous insufficiency, varicose veins, and skin darkening around the AVF. AVF, if formed in the brain, can cause headaches, seizures, and neurological deficits.

A severe complication of AVF includes high output heart failure which causes a return of oxygenated blood back into the right heart instead of the rest of the body.

Diagnosis

Ultrasound can be used to identify AVF, but the gold standard is to use advanced imaging, such as angiography. This type of imaging helps identify the exact communication point of the AVF, assess its blood flow, determine specific characteristics such as size, and guide appropriate management.

Management

Management is determined by the size, location, number, and presenting symptoms of AVF. It typically includes surgery but some patients may also benefit from radiotherapy.

If a patient obtains a fistula with the goal of receiving hemodialysis, a medical professional must evaluate it periodically to ensure it remains patent and functional. If a new fistula fails to mature or an old fistula is no longer working, they should be considered for surgery and be evaluated for a fistula at a different location.
