= North American A-5 Vigilante =

Cold War-era U.S. carrier-based supersonic bomber

A-5 (A3J) Vigilante
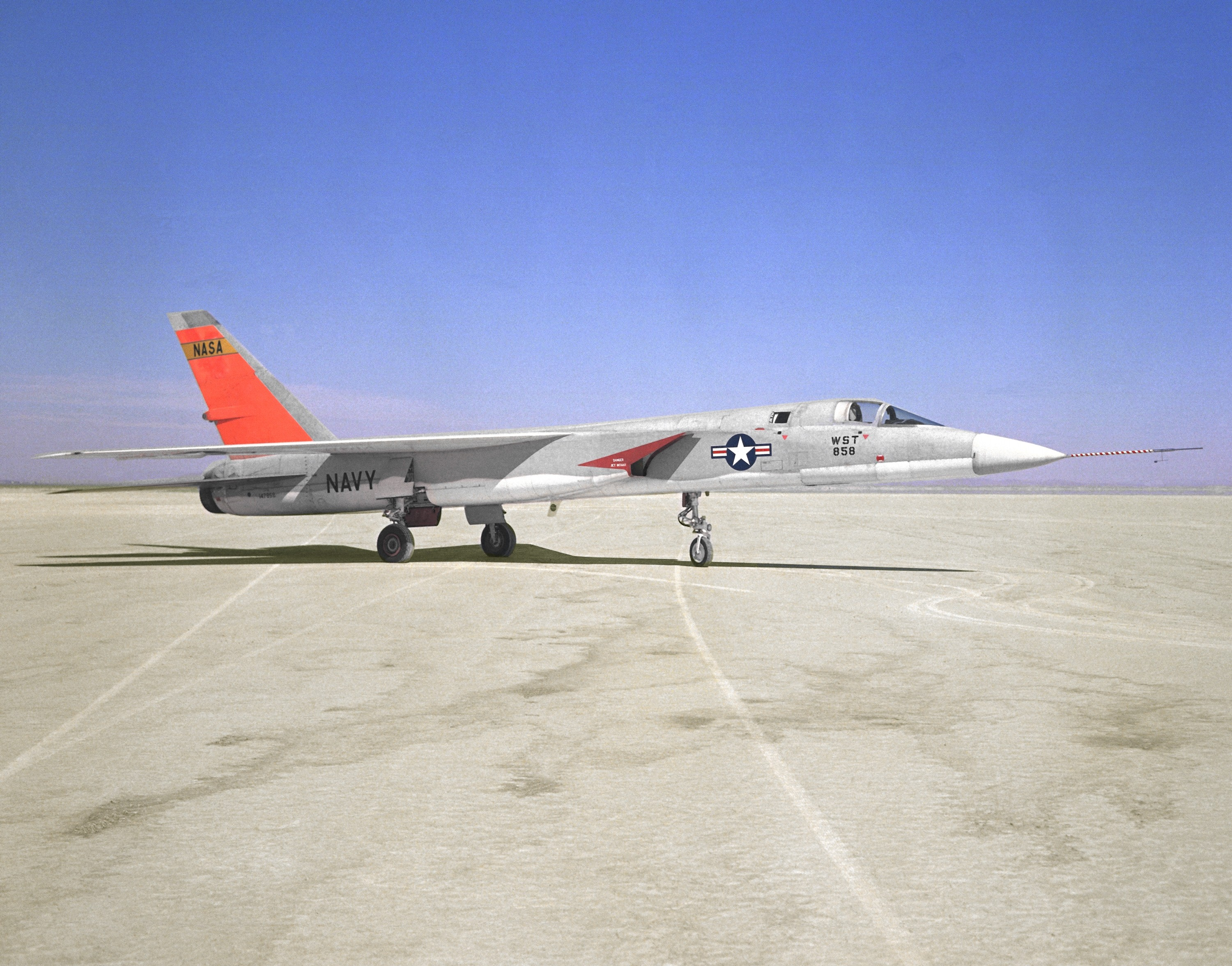
- A3J-1 147858 with NASA as 858, at NASA Dryden in support of the supersonic transport program

General information
- Type: Carrier-based nuclear bomber; Reconnaissance aircraft
- National origin: United States
- Manufacturer: North American Aviation
- Status: Retired
- Primary user: United States Navy (historic)
- Number built: 167 (137 built as or converted to RA-5C)

History
- Manufactured: 1961–1963; 1968–1970
- Introduction date: June 1961
- First flight: 31 August 1958
- Retired: 20 November 1979

The North American A-5 Vigilante is an American carrier-based supersonic bomber and reconnaissance aircraft designed and built by North American Aviation (NAA) for the United States Navy. Before the 1962 unification of Navy and Air Force designations, it was designated A3J.

Development of the A-5 had started in 1954 as a private venture by NAA, who sought to produce a capable supersonic long-distance bomber as a successor to the abortive North American XA2J Super Savage. It was a large and complex aircraft that incorporated several innovative features, such as being the first bomber to feature a digital computer, while its ability to attain speeds of up to Mach 2 while carrying a nuclear strike payload was also relatively ambitious for the era. The US Navy saw the value of such a bomber, leading to a contract for its full development and production being issued to the firm on 29 August 1956. The type performed its first flight just over two years later, on 31 August 1958.

The Vigilante was introduced by the US Navy during June 1961; it succeeded the Douglas A-3 Skywarrior as the Navy's primary nuclear strike aircraft, but its service in this capacity was relatively brief due to the deemphasizing of manned bombers in American nuclear strategy. A far larger quantity of the RA-5C tactical strike reconnaissance variant were also procured by the service, which saw extensive service during the Vietnam War. It also established several world records in both long-distance speed and altitude categories. During the mid-1970s, the withdrawal of the type commenced after a relatively short service life, largely due to the aircraft being expensive and complex to operate, as well as being a victim of post-Vietnam military cutbacks.

== Development ==
=== Origins ===
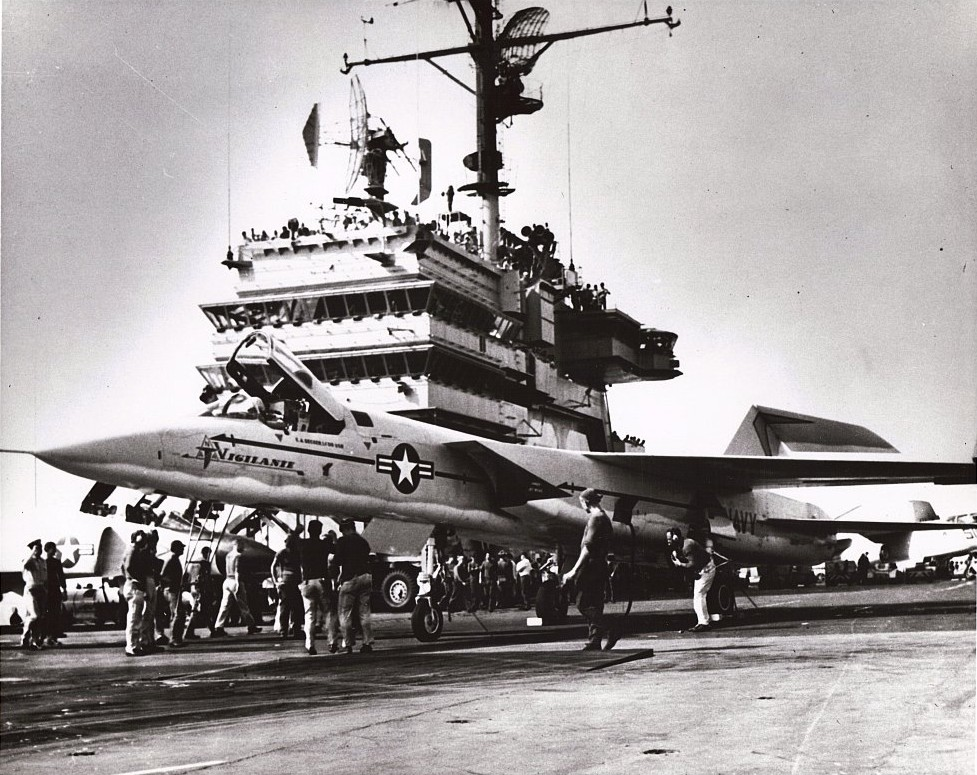
An A3J-1 (later A-5A) during trials on USS Saratoga, 1960

The late 1940s and early 1950s were marked by a series of fast-paced advancements in the field of aviation. The aircraft manufacturer North American Aviation (NAA) was one of a large number of companies that sought to harness these recent innovations in developing a new generation of aircraft. During early 1954, the company embarked on a private study into a conceptual carrier-based, long-range, all-weather strike bomber, that would be capable of supersonic speeds while carrying a sizable payload. This aircraft was envisioned as a successor to the abortive North American XA2J Super Savage. Much of this early work was undertaken by NAA's recently acquired Columbus division, overseen by chief of preliminary design Frank G. Compton.

During the mid-1950s, the notion of a nuclear-armed aircraft capable of speeds of up to Mach 2 was considered to be quite ambitious, and only more so for that same aircraft to be operable under the unavoidable constraints imposed by aircraft carrier operations. In terms of its basic configuration, the conceptual aircraft featured twin-engines and high-mounted wing, as did the XA2J, but differed substantially by being highly swept and adopting jet propulsion. According to aviation authors Bill Gunston and Peter Gilchrist, NAA's design incorporated numerous advanced technology features, such as being the first supersonic bomber to be designed with a slim forward fuselage, as well as being the first with fully-variable wedge-type side air intakes. The company's preliminary design studies had been typically centered around a twin vertical fin/rudder arrangement, but this was substituted for a single large all-moving vertical fin as design definition proceeded.

This proposal, which was referred to the North American General Purpose Attack Weapon (NAGPAW) concept, was promptly evaluated by the United States Navy. The service produced numerous challenging demands, including the somewhat contradictory necessity of both a high speed of Mach 2 and the ability to take off from an aircraft carrier at maximum weight with no head-wind, also known as wind-over-the-deck, to assist the take-off. Compton's team were able to reconcile these performance requirements into the design. Following these changes, US Navy officials voiced their approval of the design and advocated for its procurement. During July 1955, an initial design contract, which included the production of a mockup, was issued to NAA. During September 1956, a follow-on contract for the production of a pair of flight-worthy prototypes, was awarded to the firm.

On 31 August 1958, one of these prototypes performed the type's maiden flight from Columbus, Ohio. By this point, the role envisioned for the aircraft within the US Navy had shifted somewhat. According to Gunston and Gilchrist, officials had viewed the aircraft through the lens of the Korean War and placed a high value on performing low-level conventionally-armed attack missions, but had subsequently shifted towards viewing the in-development bomber as a successor to the Douglas A-3 Skywarrior in the strategic nuclear attack role instead. Thus, the design team implemented a somewhat unorthodox bomb bay as to accommodate the stowage of a nuclear weapon, which was also designed to accommodate both fuel tanks and reconnaissance payloads.

=== Further development ===
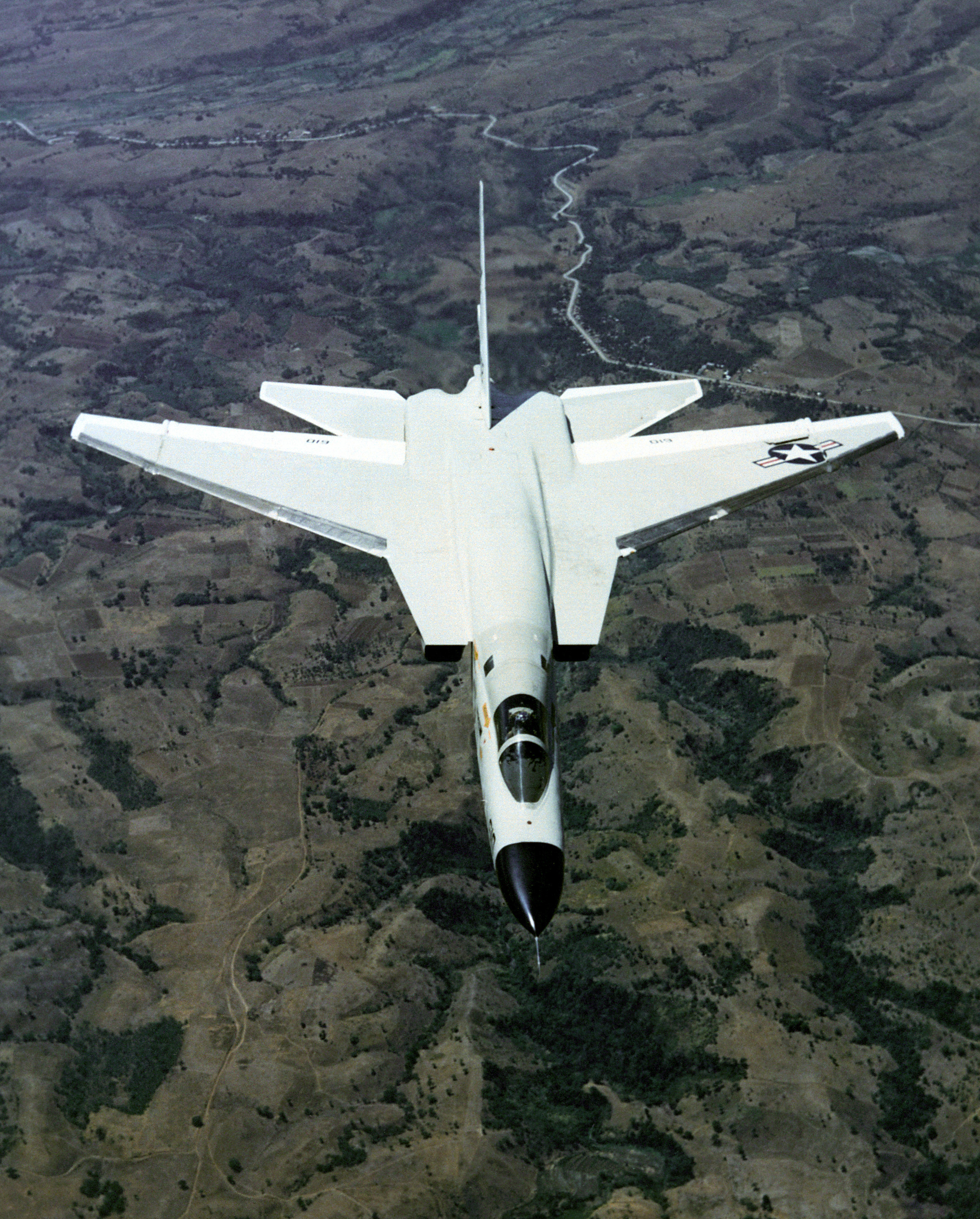
An RA-5C Vigilante

During the late 1950s and early 1960s, NAA worked on an improved bomber model, designated A-5B. This took advantage of the zero-wind requirement's elimination to considerably increase the aircraft's maximum weight, the fuselage being redesigned with a hump back to accommodate additional fuel. The wings were also redesigned with enlarged trailing-edge flaps and fully-blown flaps; these changes, when carrying four external drop tanks, roughly doubled the bomber's range. Development was halted after only six A-5Bs had been completed due to a shift in the US Navy's strategic focus that placed less value on manned bombers.

The majority of Vigilantes were of a reconnaissance configuration, designated RA-5C. It had a slightly greater wing area and added a long canoe-shaped fairing under the fuselage for a multi-sensor reconnaissance pack, which housed an APD-7 side-looking airborne radar (SLAR), AAS-21 infrared line scanner, and camera packs, as well as improved electronic countermeasures. An AN/ALQ-61 electronic intelligence system could also be carried. The RA-5C retained the AN/ASB-12 bombing system, and could, in theory, carry weapons, although it never did in service. Later-build RA-5Cs had more powerful J79-10 engines with afterburning thrust of 17,900 lbf (80 kN). The reconnaissance Vigilante weighed almost five tons more than the strike version with almost the same thrust and an only modestly enlarged wing, resulting in reduced acceleration and climb rate, though it remained fast in level flight.

The Royal Australian Air Force (RAAF) considered acquiring the RA-5C as its principal bomber to succeed its fleet of English Electric Canberras. Various other aircraft, such as the McDonnell F-4C/RF-4C, Dassault Mirage IVA, and the BAC TSR-2 were also considered for the role. However, the General Dynamics F-111C, a variant of the TFX (F-111) tailored to fulfil the requirements of the RAAF, was procured to meet the service's needs instead. Due to the F-111C's protracted development, a team of RAAF officers advocated for an interim fleet of 36 Vigilantes to be acquired by the RAAF, having determined that the aircraft satisfied the service's requirements and could be delivered within a shorter time frame. The Australian Government rejected this advice and no such procurement occurred.

== Design ==
The North American A-5 Vigilante was a supersonic carrier-based bomber. At the time of its introduction, the Vigilante was one of the largest and by far the most complex aircraft to operate from an aircraft carrier. It was furnished with a high-mounted swept wing with a boundary-layer control system (blown flaps) to improve low-speed lift. It lacked ailerons; instead, roll control was provided by spoilers in conjunction with differential deflection of the all-moving tail surfaces, which were paired with a relatively large all-moving single vertical stabilizer. The use of aluminum-lithium alloy for wing skins and titanium for critical structures was also unusual for the era; other exotic materials included the use of a gold coating to reflect heat in key areas such as the bomb bay. The wings, vertical stabilizer and the nose radome all folded to enable easier stowage onboard aircraft carriers.

Two widely spaced General Electric J79 turbojet engines were supplied with air through inlets with variable intake ramps. While the same engine was used by several other US military aircraft, such as the Convair B-58 Hustler and the McDonnell Douglas F-4 Phantom II, the powerplants used on the A-5 differed in some ways, such as the use of a somewhat uncommon air-impingement starter along with a single igniter. Both engines were equipped with constant-speed drives for alternators to generate a steady 30 kVA for the onboard electrical systems, a hydraulically-driven emergency supply generated by a ram air turbine was also installed. The visibly slanted intake design was first used on the A-5 Vigilante but later become commonplace on military aircraft such the Tupolev Tu-22 bomber, Grumman F-14 Tomcat, MiG-25 and McDonnell Douglas F-15 Eagle fighter aircraft.

The electronics of the Vigilante were relatively advanced and complex at the time of its entry to service. It incorporated one of the first "fly-by-wire" systems on an operational aircraft, along with mechanical/hydraulic backup. Other elements of its avionics include a computerized AN/ASB-12 nav/attack system incorporating a head-up display ("Pilot's Projected Display Indicator" (PPDI), one of the first), multi-mode radar, radar-equipped inertial navigation system (REINS, based on technologies developed for North American's Navaho missile), closed-circuit television camera under the nose, and an early digital computer known as "Versatile Digital Analyzer" (VERDAN) made by Autonetics to operate it all. The Vigilante was the first bomber to feature a digital computer. It was operated by a crew of two, a pilot and a bombardier-navigator (BN), that were seated in tandem; both were provided with North American HS-1A ejection seats. On the reconnaissance variant, the bombardier-navigator was replaced by a reconnaissance/attack navigator (RAN).

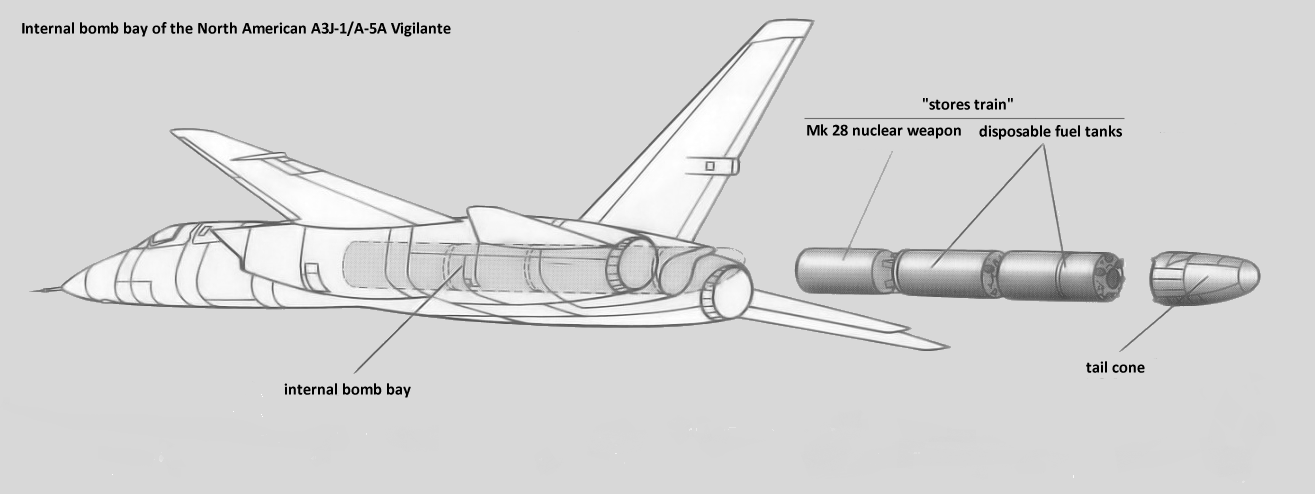
The A3J "stores train" within the bomb bay

Given its original design as a carrier-based, supersonic, nuclear heavy attack aircraft, the Vigilante's main armament was carried in an unusual "linear bomb bay" between the engines in the rear fuselage, which allowed the bomb to be dropped at supersonic speeds. The single nuclear weapon, commonly the Mk 28 bomb, was attached to two disposable fuel tanks in the cylindrical bay in an assembly known as the "stores train". A set of extendable fins was attached to the aft end of the most rearward fuel tank. These fuel tanks were to be emptied during the flight to the target and then jettisoned with the bomb by an explosive drogue gun. The stores train was propelled rearward at about 50 feet per second (30 kn) relative to the aircraft. It then followed a ballistic path. In practice, the system was not reliable and no live weapons were ever carried in the linear bomb bay. In the RA-5C configuration, the bay was used solely to accommodate fuel. On three occasions, the shock of the catapult launch caused the fuel cans to eject onto the deck; this phenomenon reportedly resulted in one aircraft loss.

Early production Vigilante were fitted with a pair of wing pylons, which were intended primarily for drop tanks. The second Vigilante variant, the A3J-2 (A-5B), featured two additional wing hardpoints, for a total of four, and also incorporated internal tanks for an additional 460 US gallons (1,700 L) of fuel (which added a pronounced dorsal "hump"). In practice, these hardpoints were rarely used. Other improvements to the type included blown flaps on the leading edge of the wing and stronger landing gear. While designated by the US Navy as a "heavy" aircraft, the A-5 was surprisingly agile; without the drag of bombs or missiles, even escorting fighters found that the clean airframe and powerful engines made the Vigilante very fast at high and low altitudes. However, its high approach speed and high angle of attack contributed to a high workload during carrier landings.

== Operational history ==
=== Introduction ===
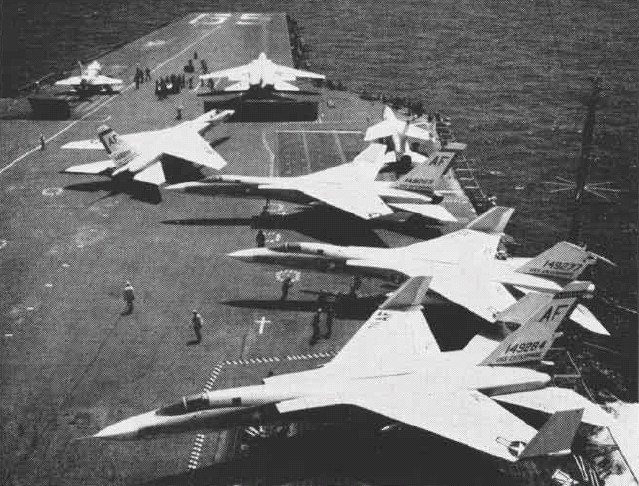
A3J-1s (A-5A post 1962) of VAH-7 on USS Enterprise in 1962.

Designated A3J-1, the Vigilante first entered service with Heavy Attack Squadron Three (VAH-3) in June 1961 at Naval Air Station Sanford, Florida, replacing the Douglas A-3 Skywarrior in the heavy attack, e.g., "strategic nuclear strike" role. All variants of the Vigilante were built at North American Aviation's facility at Port Columbus Airport in Columbus, Ohio, alongside the North American T-2 Buckeye, T-39 Sabreliner and OV-10 Bronco.

Under the Tri-Services Designation plan implemented under Robert McNamara in September 1962, the Vigilante was redesignated A-5, with the initial A3J-1 becoming A-5A and the updated A3J-2 becoming A-5B. The subsequent reconnaissance version, originally A3J-3P, became the RA-5C.

The Vigilante's early service proved troublesome, with many teething problems for its advanced systems. Although these systems were highly sophisticated, the technology was in its infancy and its reliability was poor. Although most of these reliability issues were eventually worked out as maintenance personnel gained greater experience with supporting these systems, the aircraft tended to remain a maintenance-intensive platform throughout its career.

=== End of carrier-based strategic bombing ===
The A-5's service coincided with a major policy shift in the US Navy's strategic role, which switched to emphasize submarine-launched ballistic missiles rather than manned bombers, while the US Navy had a requirement for a long range reconnaissance aircraft, which could be met by the now-surplus Vigilante. As a result, in 1963, procurement of the A-5 was ended and the type was converted to the fast reconnaissance role. The first RA-5Cs were delivered to VAH-3, the A-5A and A-5B Replacement Air Group (RAG)/Fleet Replacement Squadron (FRS), subsequently redesignated as Reconnaissance Attack Squadron Three (RVAH-3), at Naval Air Station Sanford, Florida in July 1963. As they transitioned from the attack version to the reconnaissance version, all Vigilante squadrons were subsequently redesignated from VAH to RVAH.

Under Commander, Reconnaissance Attack Wing One (COMRECONATKWING ONE), a total of 10 RA-5C squadrons were ultimately established. RVAH-3 continued to be responsible for the stateside-based RA-5C training mission of flight crews, maintenance and support personnel, while RVAH-1, RVAH-5, RVAH-6, RVAH-7, RVAH-9, RVAH-11, RVAH-12, RVAH-13 and RVAH-14 routinely deployed aboard Forrestal, Saratoga, Ranger, Independence, Kitty Hawk, Constellation, Enterprise, America, John F. Kennedy and Nimitz to the Atlantic, Mediterranean and Western Pacific.

=== Vietnam service ===
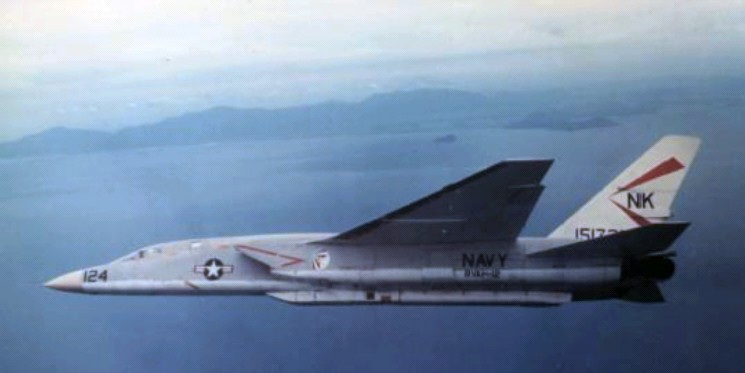
An RVAH-12 RA-5C beginning its reconnaissance run over Vietnam, 1967.

Eight of ten squadrons of RA-5C Vigilantes also saw extensive service in the Vietnam War starting in August 1964, carrying out hazardous medium-level post-strike reconnaissance missions. Although it proved fast and agile, 18 RA-5Cs were lost in combat: 14 to anti-aircraft fire, 3 to surface-to-air missiles, and 1 to a MiG-21 during Operation Linebacker II. Nine more RA-5Cs were lost in operational accidents while serving with Task Force 77. Due, in part, to these combat losses, 36 additional RA-5C aircraft were built from 1968 to 1970 as attrition replacements.

In 1968, Congress closed the aircraft's original operating base of Naval Air Station Sanford, Florida and transferred the parent wing, Reconnaissance Attack Wing One, all subordinate squadrons and all aircraft and personnel to Turner AFB, a Strategic Air Command (SAC) Boeing B-52 Stratofortress and Boeing KC-135 base in Albany, Georgia. The tenant SAC bomb wing was then inactivated and control of Turner AFB was transferred from the Air Force to the Navy with the installation renamed Naval Air Station Albany. In 1974, after barely six years of service as a naval air station, Congress opted to close Naval Air Station Albany as part of a post-Vietnam force reduction, transferring all RA-5C units and personnel to Naval Air Station Key West, Florida.

=== Retirement ===
Despite the Vigilante's useful service, it was expensive and complex to operate and occupied significant amounts of precious flight deck and hangar deck space aboard both conventional and nuclear-powered aircraft carriers at a time when carrier air wings, with the introduction of the F-14 Tomcat and S-3 Viking, were averaging 90 aircraft, many of which were larger than their predecessors. With the end of the Vietnam War, disestablishment of RVAH squadrons began in 1974, with the last Vigilante squadron, RVAH-7, completing its final deployment to the Western Pacific aboard USS Ranger in late 1979. The final flight by an RA-5C took place on 20 November 1979 when a Vigilante departed Naval Air Station Key West, Florida. Reconnaissance Attack Wing One was subsequently disestablished at Naval Air Station Key West in January 1980.

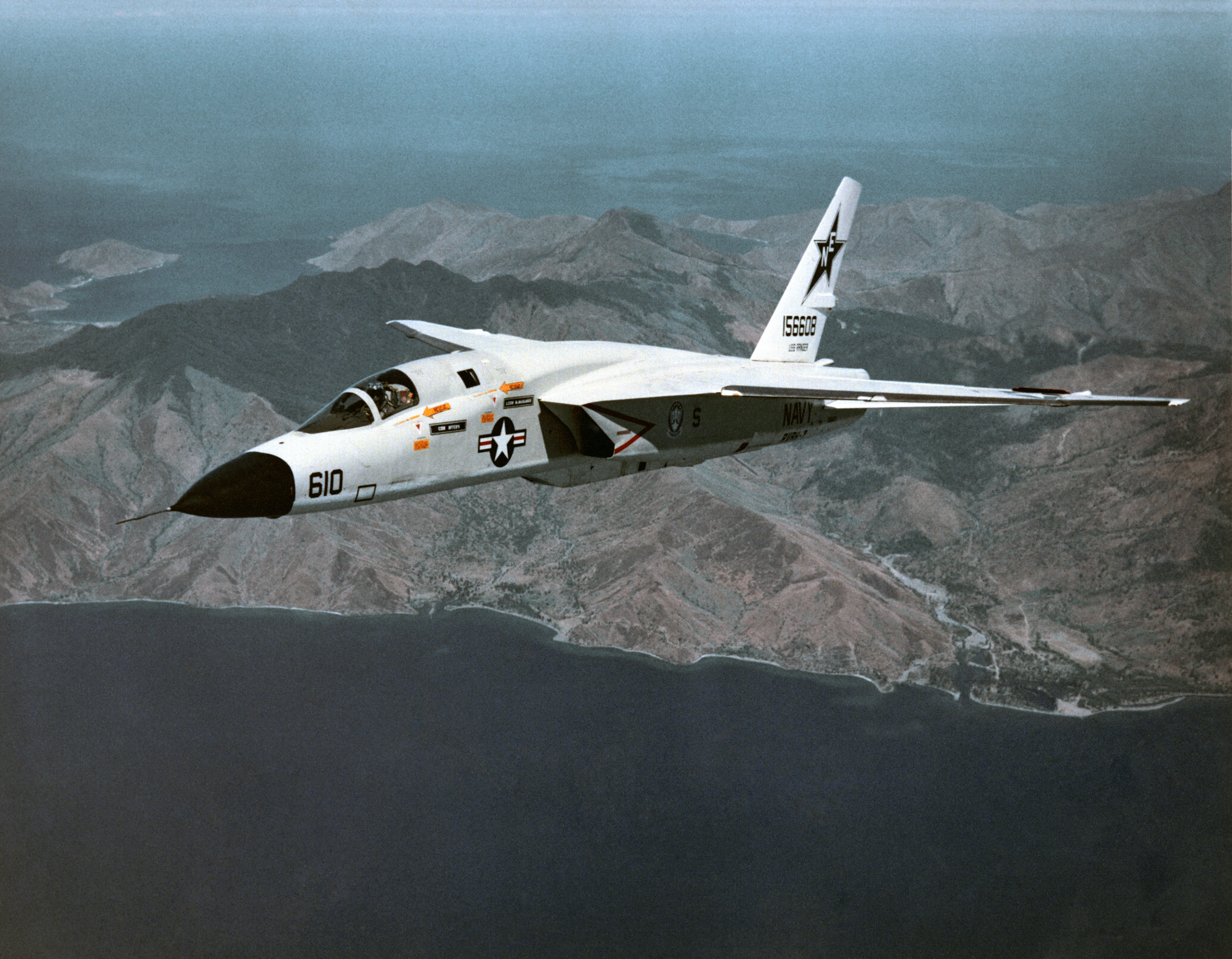
RA-5C Vigilante, BuNo 156608, from Reconnaissance Attack Squadron 7 (RVAH-7) during what may have been its final flight in 1979. This aircraft is now on permanent display at Naval Support Activity Mid-South (formerly Naval Air Station Memphis), Tennessee.

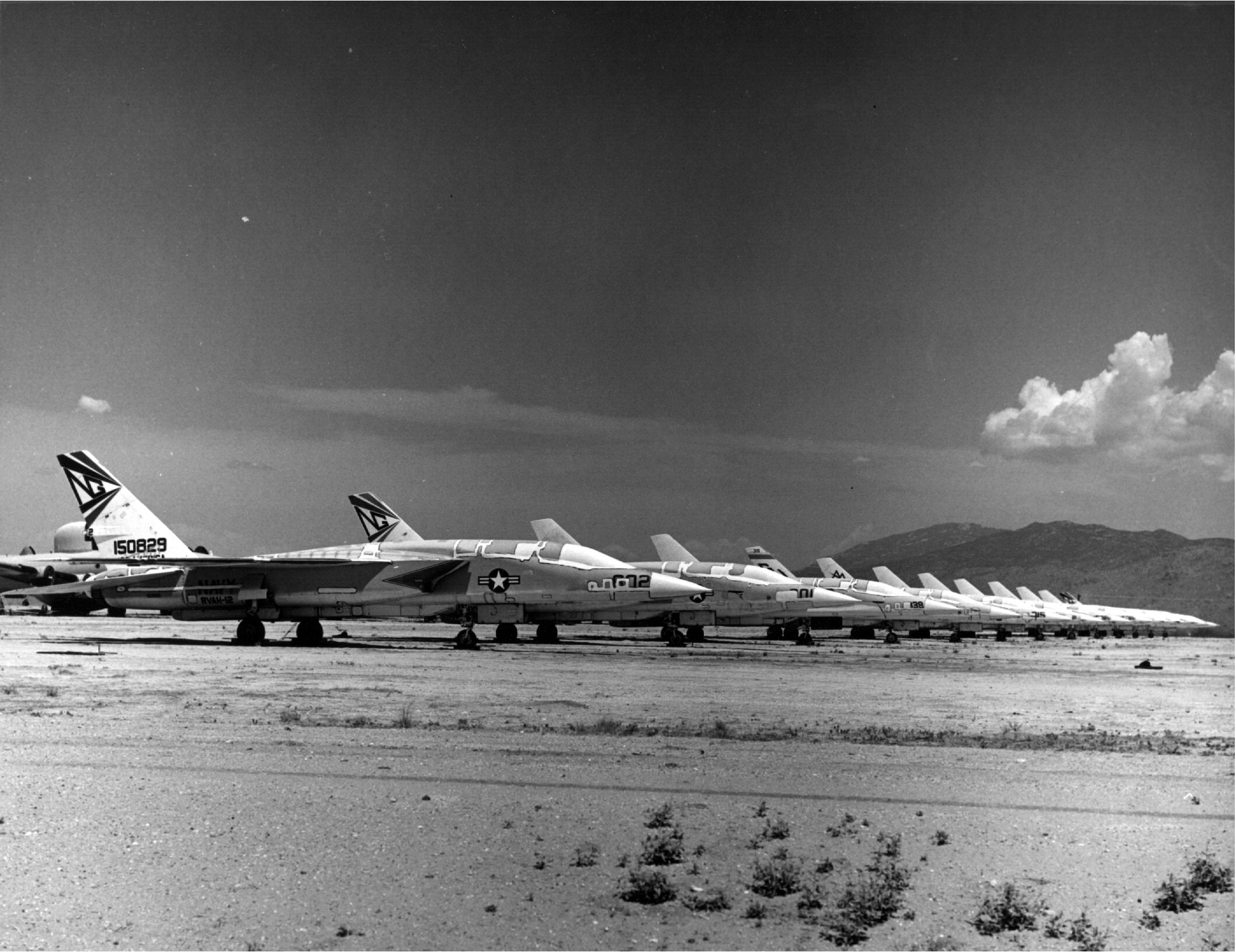
Retired RA-5Cs in storage at Military Aircraft Storage and Disposition Center, Davis-Monthan AFB, Arizona in November 1978.

The Vigilante did not end the career of the A-3 Skywarrior, which would carry on as photo reconnaissance aircraft, electronic warfare platforms, aerial refueling tankers, and executive transport aircraft designated as RA-3A/B, EA-3A/B, ERA-3B, EKA-3B, KA-3B, and VA-3B, into the early 1990s.

Fighters replaced the RA-5C in the carrier-based reconnaissance role. The RF-8G version of the Vought F-8 Crusader, modified with internal cameras, had already been serving in two light photographic squadrons (VFP-62 and VFP-63) since the early 1960s, operating from older aircraft carriers unable to support the Vigilante. The Marine Corps' sole photographic squadron (VMFP-3) would also deploy aboard aircraft carriers during this period with RF-4B Phantom II aircraft. These squadrons superseded the Vigilante's role by providing detachments from the primary squadron to carrier air wings throughout the late 1970s and early-to-mid-1980s, until the transfer of the recon mission to the Navy's fighter squadron (VF) community operating the F-14 Tomcat. Select models of the F-14 Tomcat would eventually carry the multi-sensor Tactical Airborne Reconnaissance Pod System (TARPS) and the Digital Tactical Air Reconnaissance Pod (D-TARPS). Up to present day, the weight of carrier-based fighters such as the F-14 Tomcat and Boeing F/A-18E/F Super Hornet have evolved into the same 62,950 lb (28,550 kg) class as the Vigilante.

=== Records ===
On 13 December 1960, Navy Commander Leroy A. Heath (pilot) and Lieutenant Larry Monroe (bombardier/navigator) established a world altitude record of 91,450.8 feet (27,874.2 m) in an A3J Vigilante carrying a 2,200-pound (1,000 kg) payload, beating the previous record by over 4 miles (6.4 km). This new record held for more than 13 years. The attempt was accomplished by reaching a speed of Mach 2.1, then pulling up to create a ballistic trajectory beyond the altitude at which its wings could continue to function. The engines flamed out in the thin atmosphere, and the aircraft rolled onto its back. This had already been experienced in previous flights, and so the pilot simply released the controls and the aircraft regained control naturally as it descended back into the thicker air of the lower atmosphere.

== Variants ==
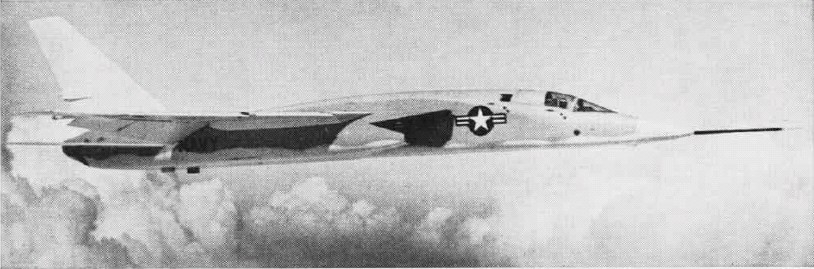
A YA-5C (XA3J-3P) prototype, 1963

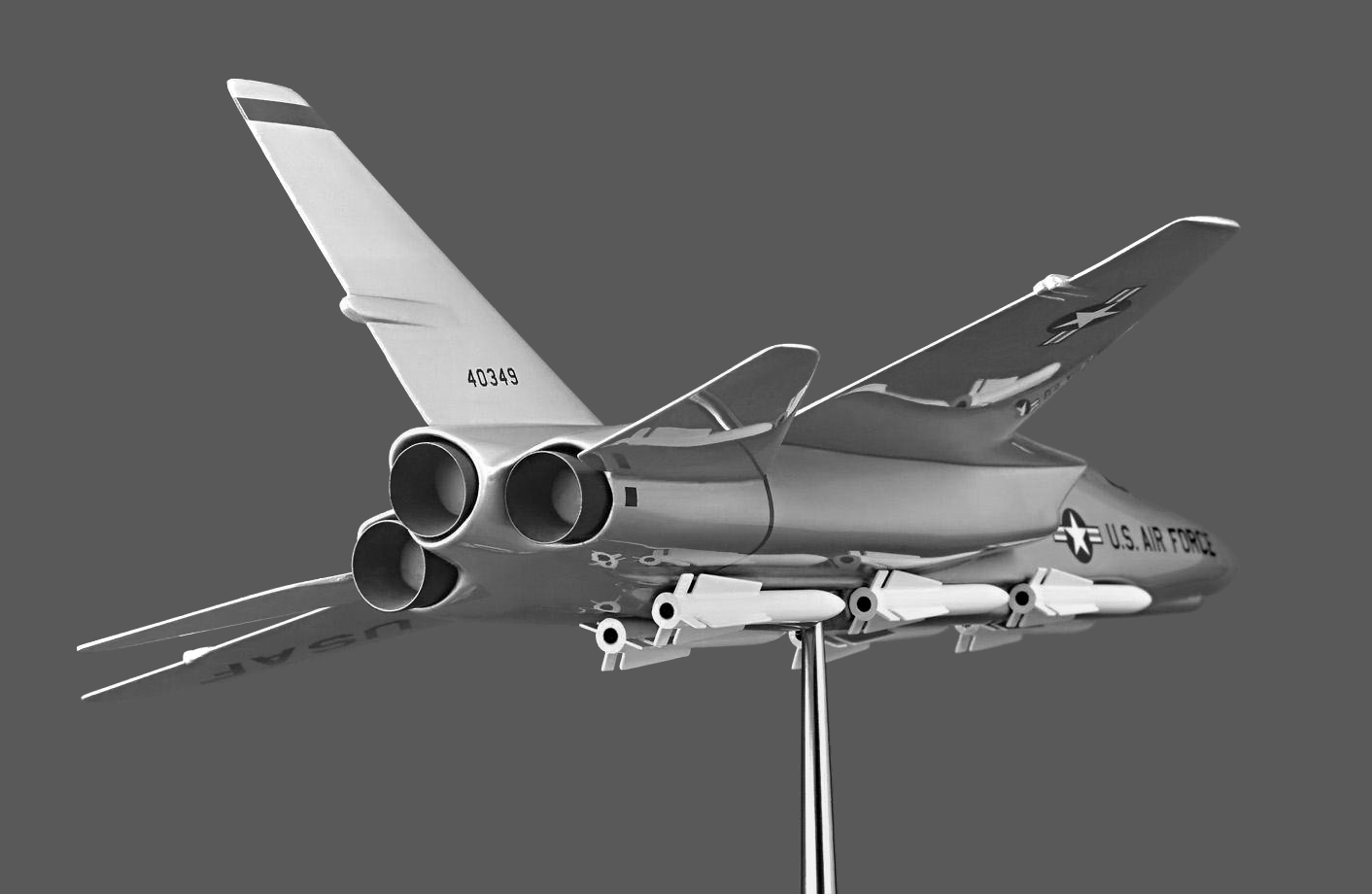
Manufacturer's model of the NR-349 proposal

XA3J-1
(NA247) Prototypes, two built, one converted to RA-5C, one crashed 1959.
A3J
Proposal with Pratt & Whitney J58-P-2 engines.
A3J-1
58 built, 6 cancelled, survivors re-designated A-5A in 1962, 42 converted to RA-5C. Another variant with variable geometry wings and canards was proposed.
A3J-2
18 built, redesignated A-5B, 5 completed as XA3J-3P (YA-5C), all converted to RA-5C.
XA3J-3P
5 A3J-2s completed without reconnaissance systems and assigned to pilot familiarization, later converted to RA-5C.
A3J-3P
20 built, re-designated RA-5C.
A-5A
A3J-1 re-designated.
A-5B
A3J-2 re-designated.
YA-5C
The 5 XA3J-3P aircraft re-designated, before conversion to RA-5C
RA-5C
Reconnaissance aircraft, 77 contracted, 8 cancelled, 69 built, plus 20 redesignated and 61 converted from earlier variants
NA-247
Proposed U.S. Air Force variant in 1958 with an XLR46-NA-2 rocket engine installed in the linear bomb bay.
NR-349
Proposed Improved Manned Interceptor for U.S. Air Force with three J79 engines and an armament of six AIM-54 Phoenix missiles.

== Operators ==
United States

- United States Navy

== Aircraft on display ==
=== Philippines ===
RA-5C

- BuNo 156627 – It was transferred from long-term storage at nearby Naval Air Station Cubi Point. On Public Display at a Public Park in Olongapo City in Zambales painted in NASA colors of BuNo 147858.

=== United States ===
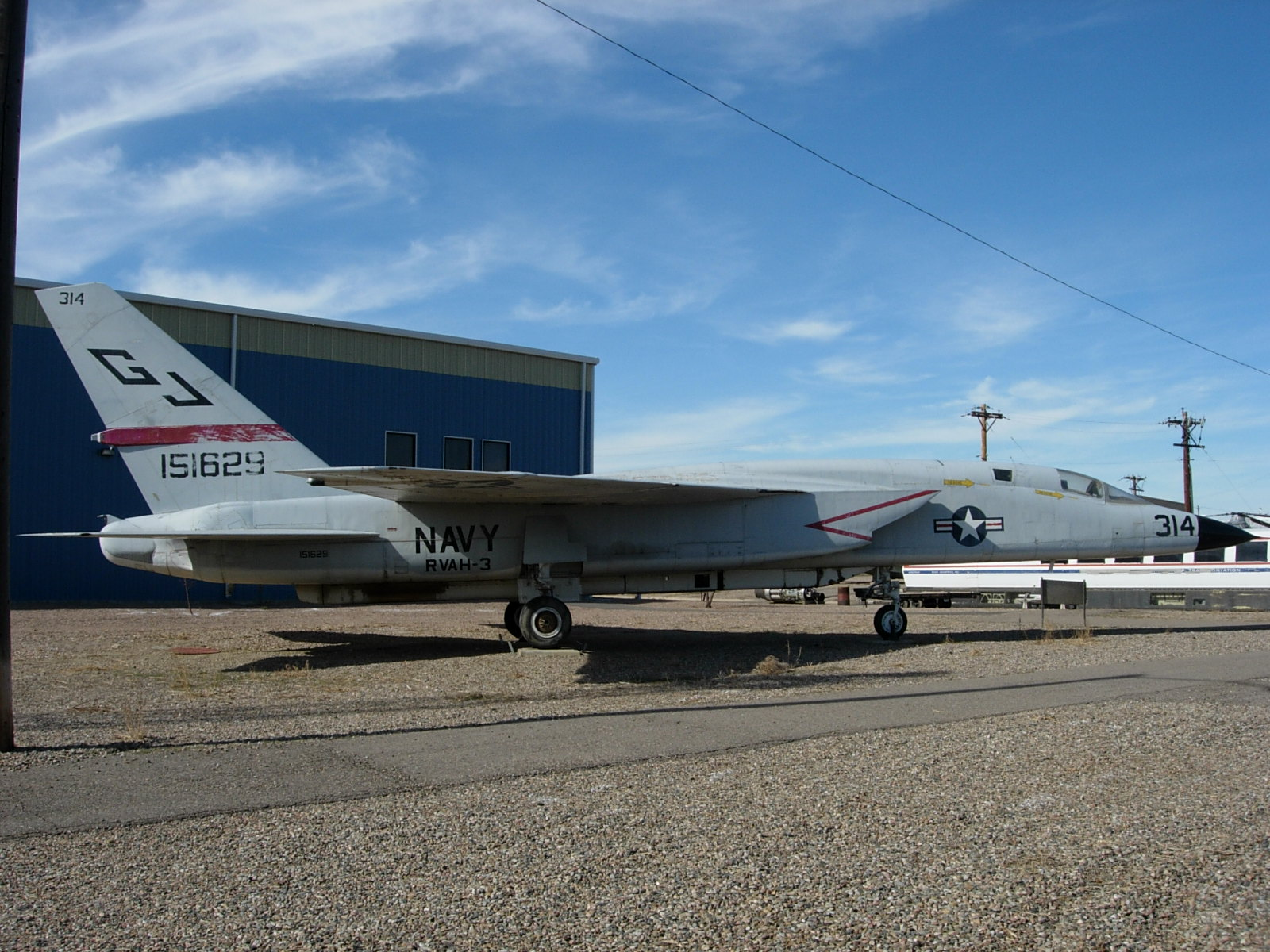
RA-5C BuNo 151629 on outdoor display in RVAH-3 markings at the Pueblo Weisbrod Aircraft Museum in Pueblo, Colorado, in November 2007. This aircraft has since been repainted in RVAH-7 markings.

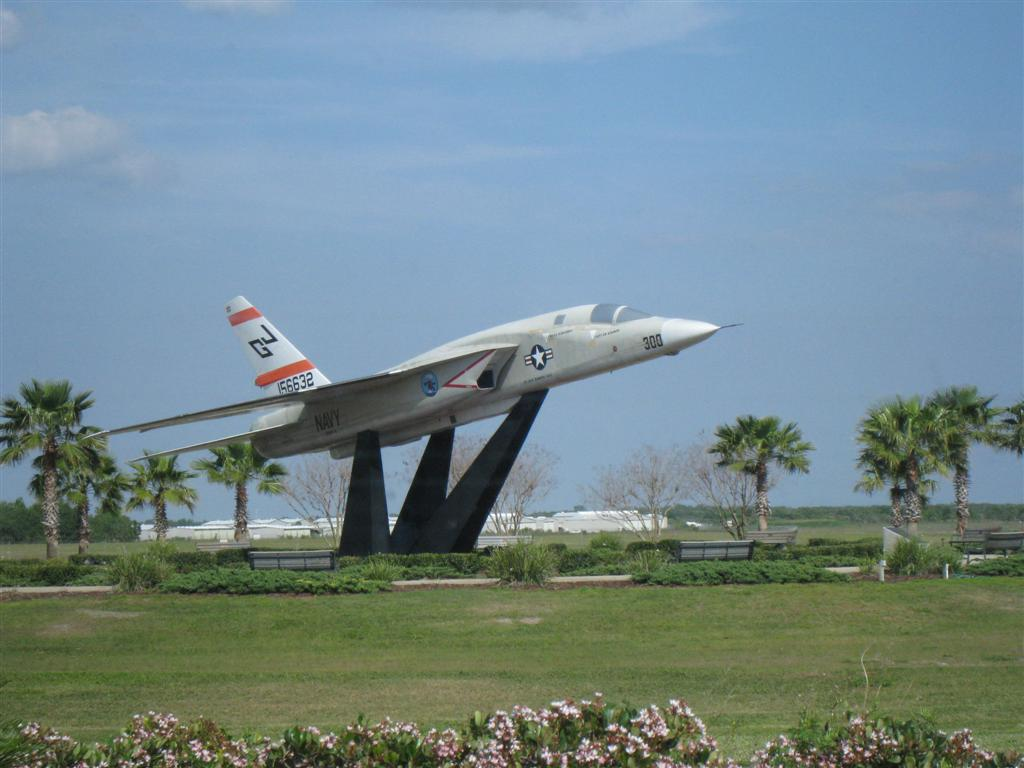
RA-5C Vigilante, BuNo 156632, on display at Orlando Sanford International Airport (formerly Naval Air Station Sanford in late March 2008

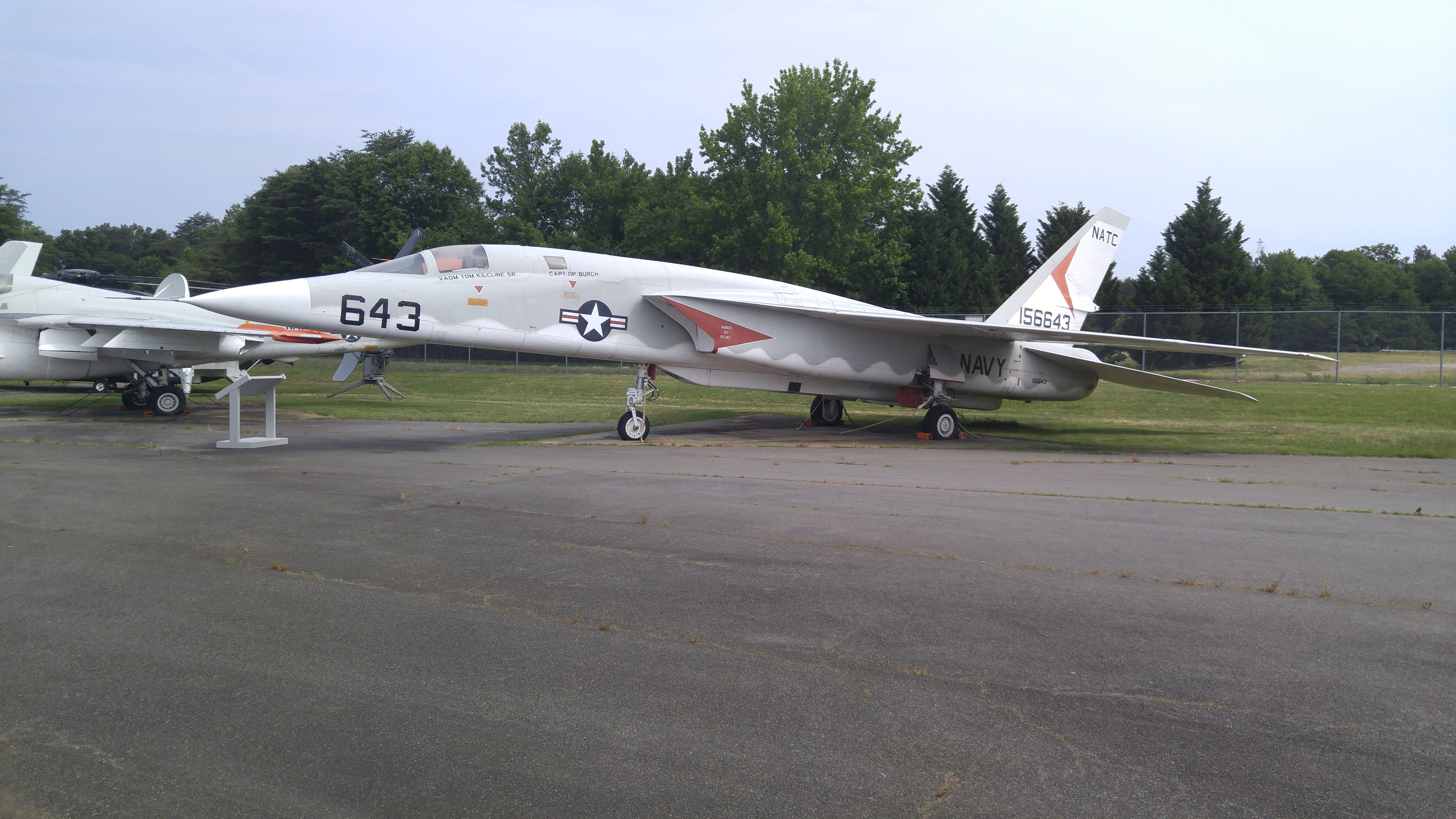
RA-5C BuNo 156643 on Display at the Pax River Naval Air Station Museum, Maryland, July 2017

A-5A

- BuNo 146697 – Naval Air Station Patuxent River, Lexington Park, Maryland. It is the oldest Vigilante on display and the only one still in its original A3J/A-5A nuclear attack bomber configuration. It is now a monument fixed on a pedestal.

An additional example of an A-5A destined for restoration as a museum aircraft, BuNo 146698, was destroyed when it was being relocated by Army helicopter from Naval Air Engineering Station Lakehurst, New Jersey to a new location. When the A-5A became unstable in flight, the helicopter crew was forced to jettison the aircraft from altitude.

RA-5C

- BuNo 149289 – Pima Air & Space Museum in Tucson, Arizona. It was transferred from long-term storage at nearby Davis-Monthan Air Force Base and it carries the markings of RVAH-3.
- BuNo 151629 - Pueblo Weisbrod Aircraft Museum (formerly the Fred E. Weisbrod Museum/International B-24 Museum) in Pueblo, Colorado. It has been restored and currently displays the markings of RVAH-7 while assigned to Carrier Air Wing 9 aboard Enterprise.
- BuNo 156608 - Naval Support Activity Mid-South, formerly Naval Air Station Memphis, Tennessee. It was the last operational RA-5C aircraft and it carries the markings of its last squadron, RVAH-7, during its final deployment with Carrier Air Wing 2 aboard Ranger in 1979.
- BuNo 156612 - Naval Air Station Key West, Florida. "Gate guard" aircraft located just inside the main gate. It carries the markings of RVAH-3.
- BuNo 156615 - Castle Air Museum at the former Castle Air Force Base, California in 2012. This aircraft was formerly located on the Naval Air Weapons Station China Lake Range. This particular RA-5C was the last Vigilante to land aboard the USS Ranger (CV-61) while assigned to RVAH-7 in August 1979 during the last Vigilante overseas carrier deployment.
- BuNo 156621 – New York State Aerosciences Museum (ESAM) in Glenville, New York. It was initially on display at the former US Naval Photographic School at Naval Air Station Pensacola. In 1986, it was shipped up the East Coast by barge and placed on display aboard the USS Intrepid Museum in New York City. In 2005, this RA-5C was acquired by ESAM. The aircraft suffered minor damage to its fuselage aft of the wing root while being moved from the aircraft carrier Intrepid to a barge while supported by slings. As of 2010 it was undergoing restoration for display. It carries the markings of the RA-5C Fleet Replacement Squadron (FRS), RVAH-3.
- BuNo 156624 – National Naval Aviation Museum at Naval Air Station Pensacola. It is displayed in the markings of RVAH-6 per that squadron's final cruise with Carrier Air Wing 8 aboard Nimitz in 1978.
- BuNo 156632 – Orlando Sanford International Airport (formerly Naval Air Station Sanford) in Sanford, Florida. It was placed there on 30 May 2003 as a memorial to A-5A and RA-5C aircrewmen and support personnel who served at NAS Sanford. On loan from the National Museum of Naval Aviation, the aircraft was transferred from the Naval Air Systems Command (NAVAIR) Weapons Division at Naval Air Weapons Station China Lake, California and is marked as an RVAH-3 aircraft.
- BuNo 156638 – Naval Air Station Fallon, Nevada. It was transferred from Naval Air Weapons Station China Lake, California and was previously marked as an RVAH-6 aircraft in a Vietnam-era jungle camouflage paint scheme, as an RVAH-12 aircraft in traditional Cold War gray/white paint scheme, and currently as an RVAH-7 aircraft in traditional gray/white paint scheme.
- BuNo 156641 – USS Midway Museum in San Diego, California. It carries the markings of RVAH-12 and RVAH-7 Both squadrons represented on the tail of the aircraft.
- BuNo 156643 – Patuxent River Naval Air Museum, at Naval Air Station Patuxent River, Maryland. It was transferred from Naval Air Station Key West and is displayed as a test aircraft operated by the Patuxent River Flight Test Division in the 1970s. It was the last RA-5C built.

== Specifications (A-5A/A3J-1 Vigilante) ==
Orthographically projected diagram of the A-5A Vigilante.

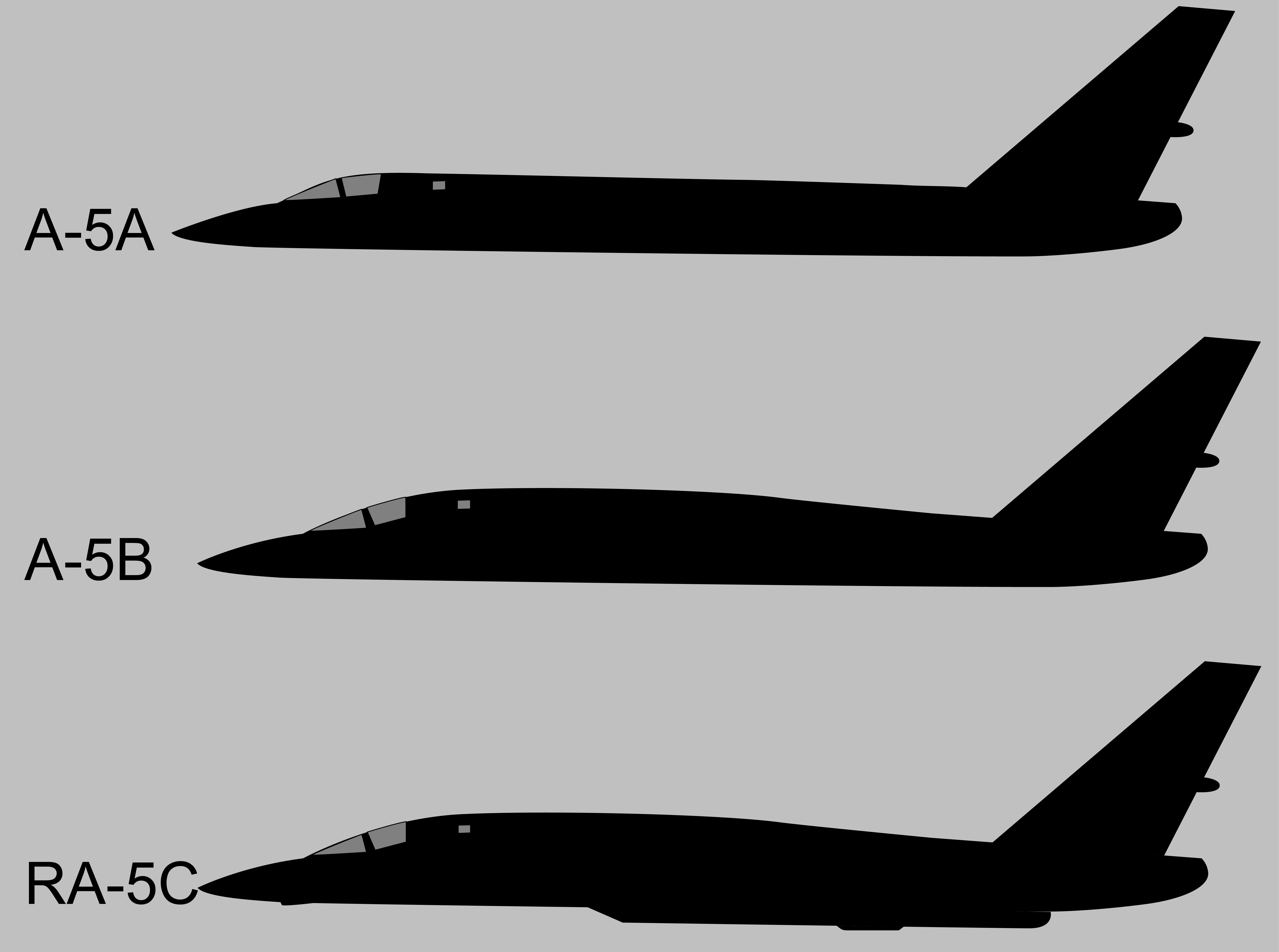

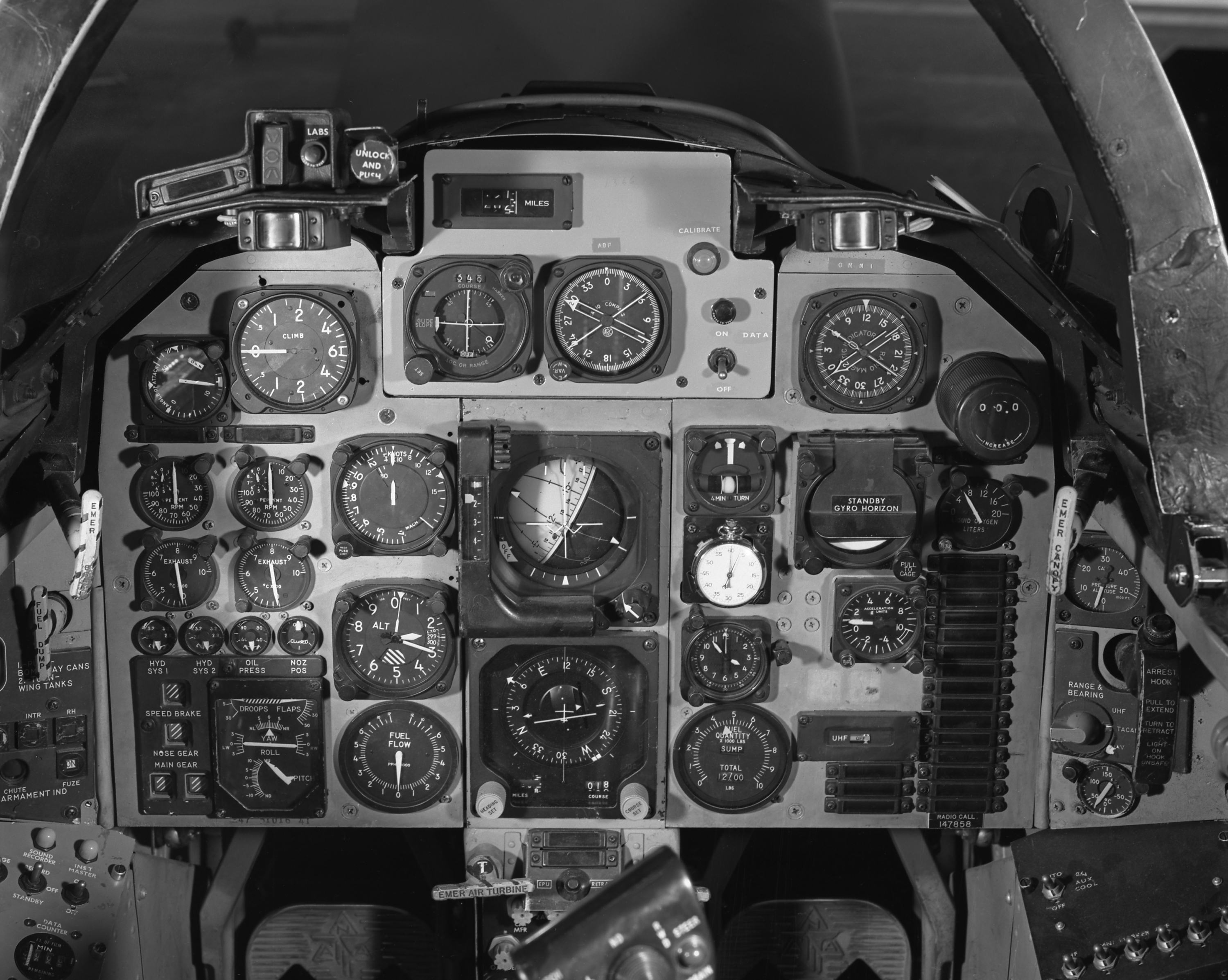
Cockpit instrument panel

Data from Naval Air Systems Command

General characteristics

- Crew: 2
- Length: 76 ft 6 in (23.32 m)
- Wingspan: 53 ft 0 in (16.16 m)
- Height: 19 ft 5 in (5.91 m)
- Wing area: 701 sq ft (65.1 m^{2})
- Empty weight: 32,783 lb (14,870 kg)
- Gross weight: 47,631 lb (21,605 kg)
- Max takeoff weight: 63,085 lb (28,615 kg)
- Fuel capacity: 2,805 US gal (10,618 L; 2,336 imp gal) internal or 19,074 lb (8,652 kg) of JP-5, or 24,514 lb (11,119 kg) with 2 × 400 US gal external tanks
- Powerplant: 2 × General Electric J79-GE-8 after-burning turbojet engines, 10,900 lbf (48 kN) thrust each dry, 17,000 lbf (76 kN) with afterburner

Performance

- Maximum speed: 1,149 kn (1,322 mph, 2,128 km/h) at 40,000 ft (12,000 m)
- Maximum speed: Mach 2
- Combat range: 974 nmi (1,121 mi, 1,804 km) (to target and return)
- Ferry range: 1,571 nmi (1,808 mi, 2,909 km)
- Service ceiling: 52,100 ft (15,900 m)
- g limits: +5
- Rate of climb: 33,900 ft/min (172 m/s)
- Wing loading: 80.4 lb/sq ft (393 kg/m^{2})
- Thrust/weight: 0.72

Armament

- Bombs: ** 1 × B27, B28 or B43 free-fall nuclear bomb in internal weapons bay
  - 2 × B43, Mark 83 or Mark 84 bombs on two external hardpoints

Avionics
Systems carried by A-5 or RA-5C

- AN/ASB-12 Bombing & Navigation Radar (A-5, RA-5C)
- Westinghouse AN/APD-7 SLAR (RA-5C)
- Sanders AN/ALQ-100 E/F/G/H-Band Radar Jammer (RA-5C)
- Sanders AN/ALQ-41 X-Band Radar Jammer (A-5, RA-5C)
- AIL AN/ALQ-61 Radio/Radar/IR ECM Receiver (RA-5C)
- Litton ALR-45 "COMPASS TIE" 2-18 GHz Radar Warning Receiver (RA-5C)
- Magnavox AN/APR-27 SAM Radar Warning Receiver (RA-5C)
- Itek AN/APR-25 S/X/C-Band Radar Detection and Homing Set (RA-5C)
- Motorola AN/APR-18 Electronic Reconnaissance System (A-5, RA-5C)
- AN/AAS-21 IR Reconnaissance Camera (RA-5C)

== See also ==
Related development

- North American XF-108 Rapier

Aircraft of comparable role, configuration, and era

- BAC TSR-2
- Dassault Mirage IV
- General Dynamics–Grumman F-111B

Related lists

- List of bomber aircraft
- List of United States Navy aircraft designations (pre-1962)
