= Arteriovenous =

Arteriovenous refers to relations between arteries and veins, such as:

- Arteriovenous malformation
- Arteriovenous fistula
- Arteriovenous oxygen difference
- Arteriovenous anastomosis
