= RVAH-7 =

Reconnaissance Attack (Heavy) Squadron 7
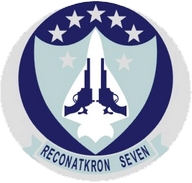
- RVAH-7 squadron patch
- Active: 10 August 1950 – 28 September 1979
- Country: United States
- Branch: United States Navy
- Role: Photo-reconnaissance
- Part of: Inactive
- Nickname(s): Peacemakers of the Fleet; Go Devils
- Engagements: Vietnam War

RVAH-7 was a reconnaissance attack (heavy) squadron of the U.S. Navy. Originally established as Composite Squadron Seven (VC-7) on 10 August 1950, it was redesignated as Heavy Attack Squadron Seven (VAH-7) on 1 November 1955 and was redesignated again as Reconnaissance Attack (Heavy) Squadron Seven (RVAH-7) on 1 December 1964. The squadron was disestablished on 28 September 1979.

== Operational history ==
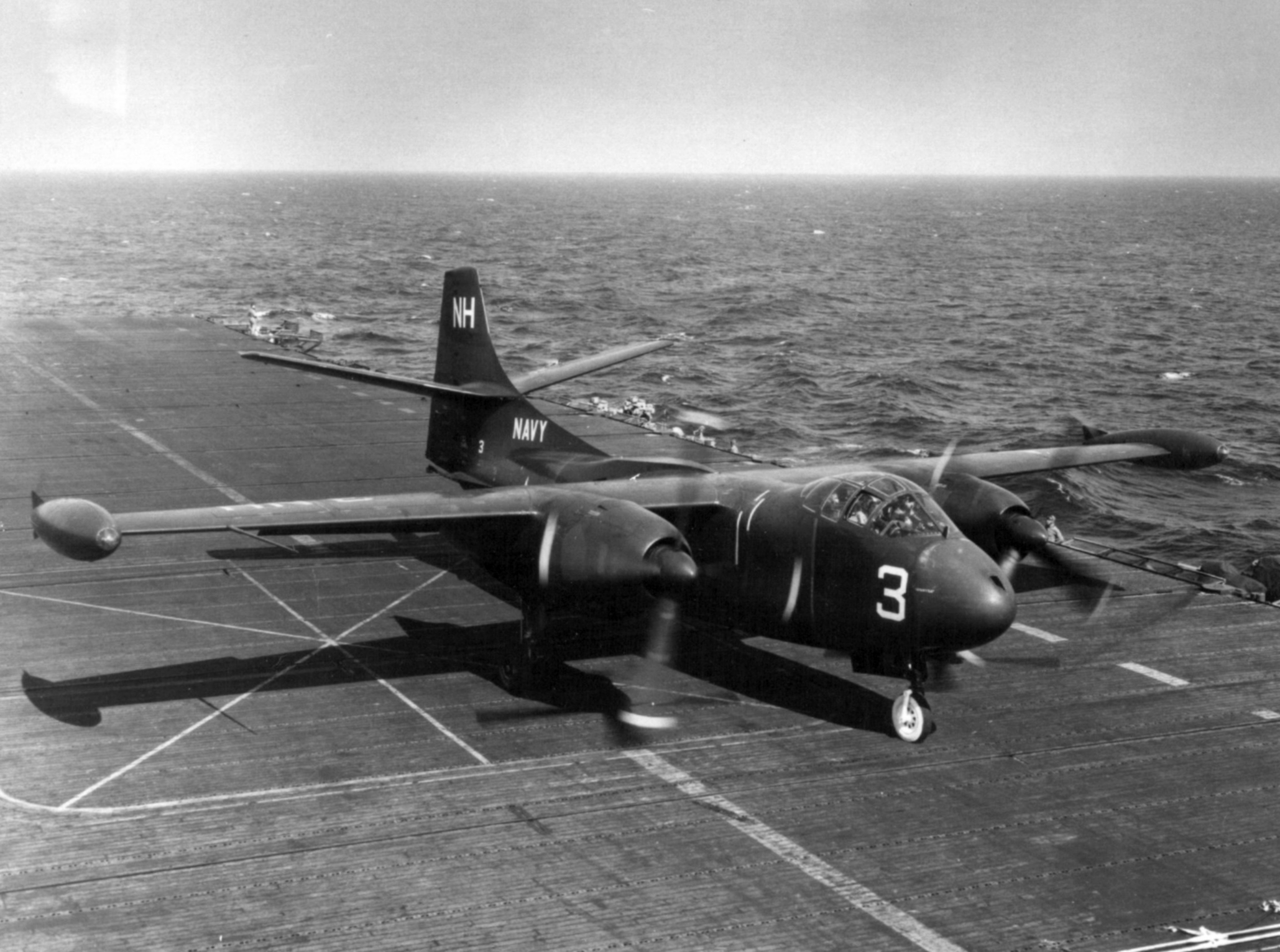
VC-7 AJ-1 Savage on board USS Wasp c. 1954

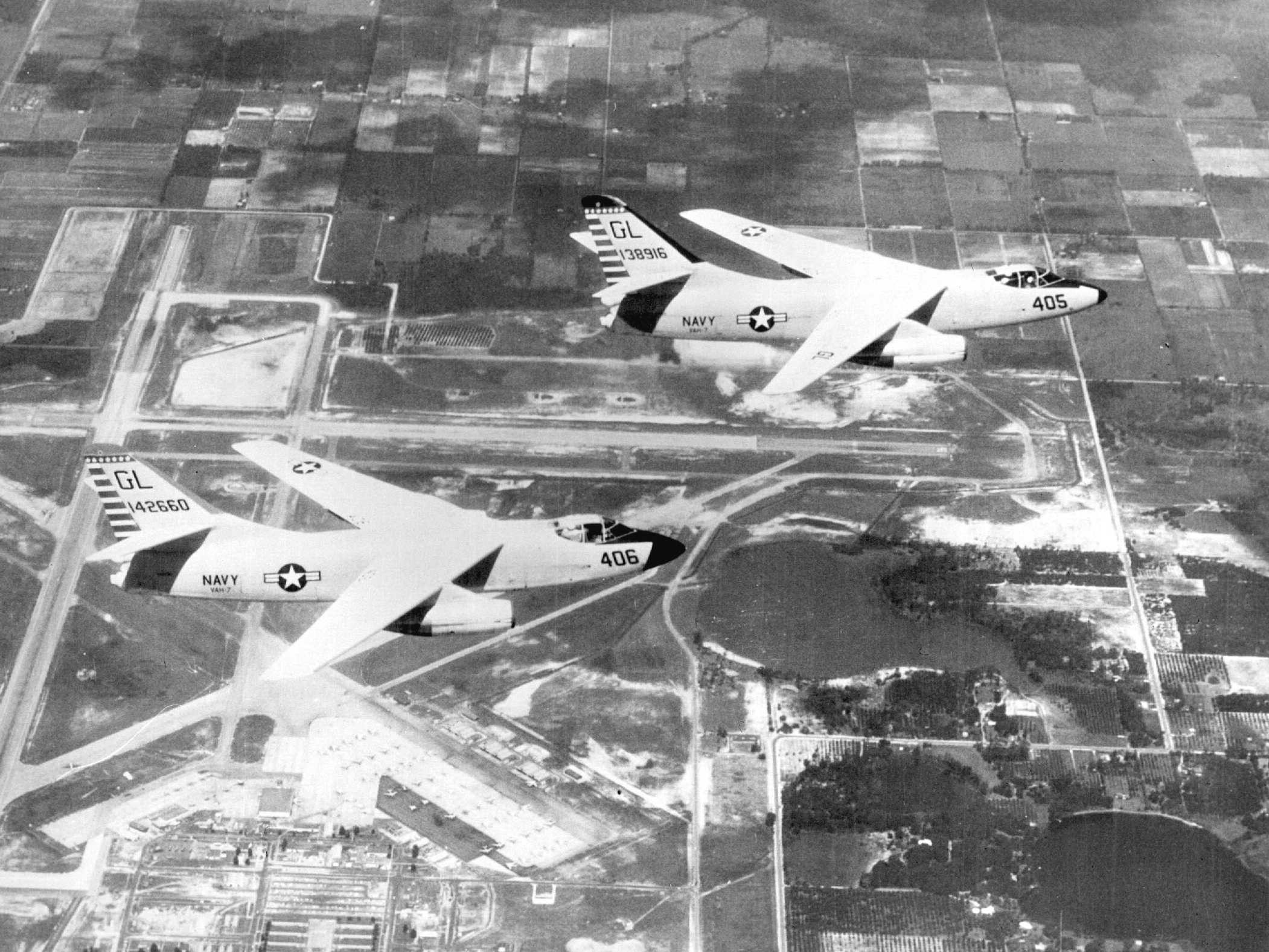
A pair of VAH-7 A3D-2 Skywarriors fly over Naval Air Station Sanford circa 1959

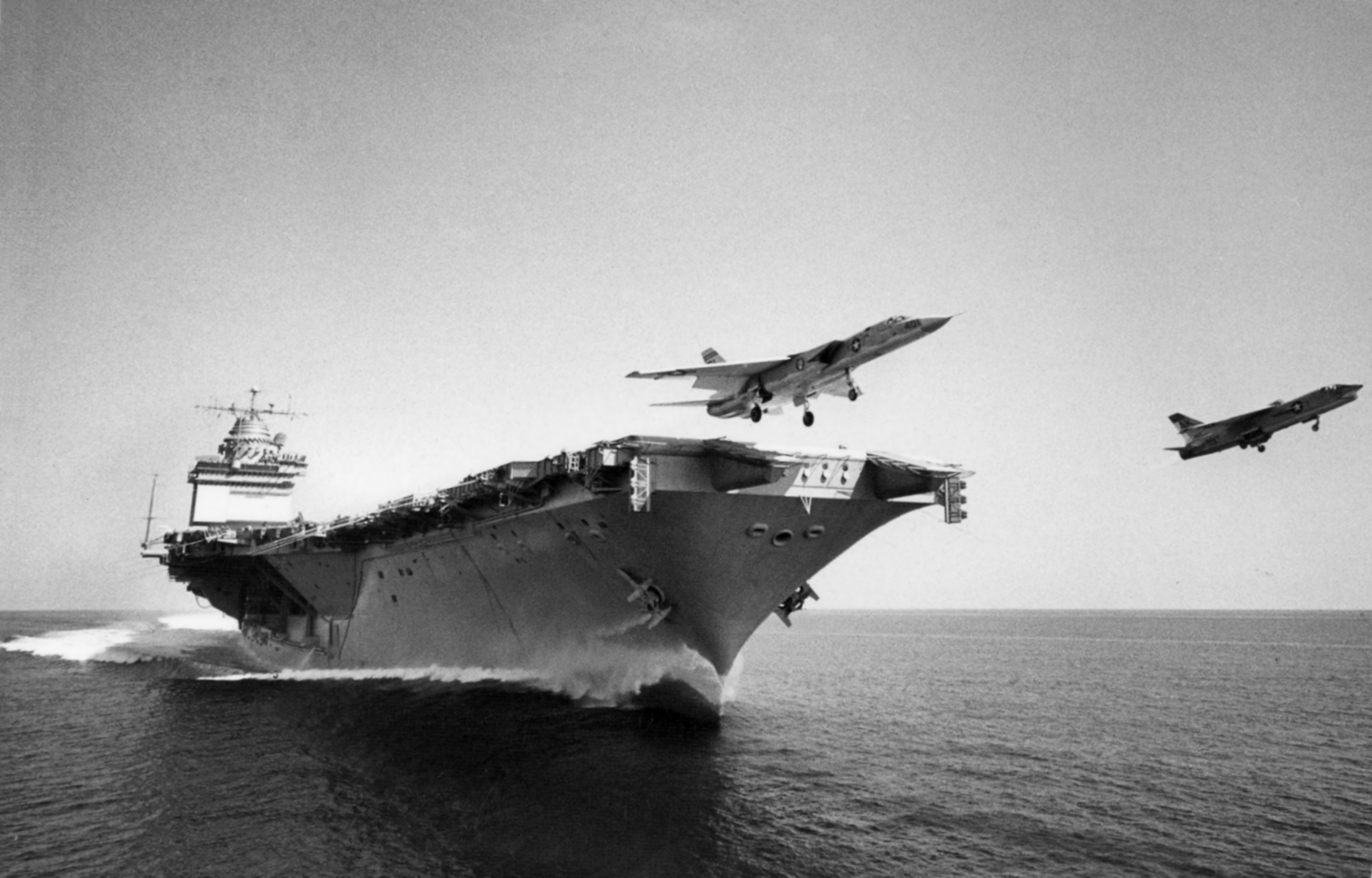
VAH-7 A3J-1 Vigilante and VF-62 F8U-1 Crusader launch from USS Enterprise in 1962

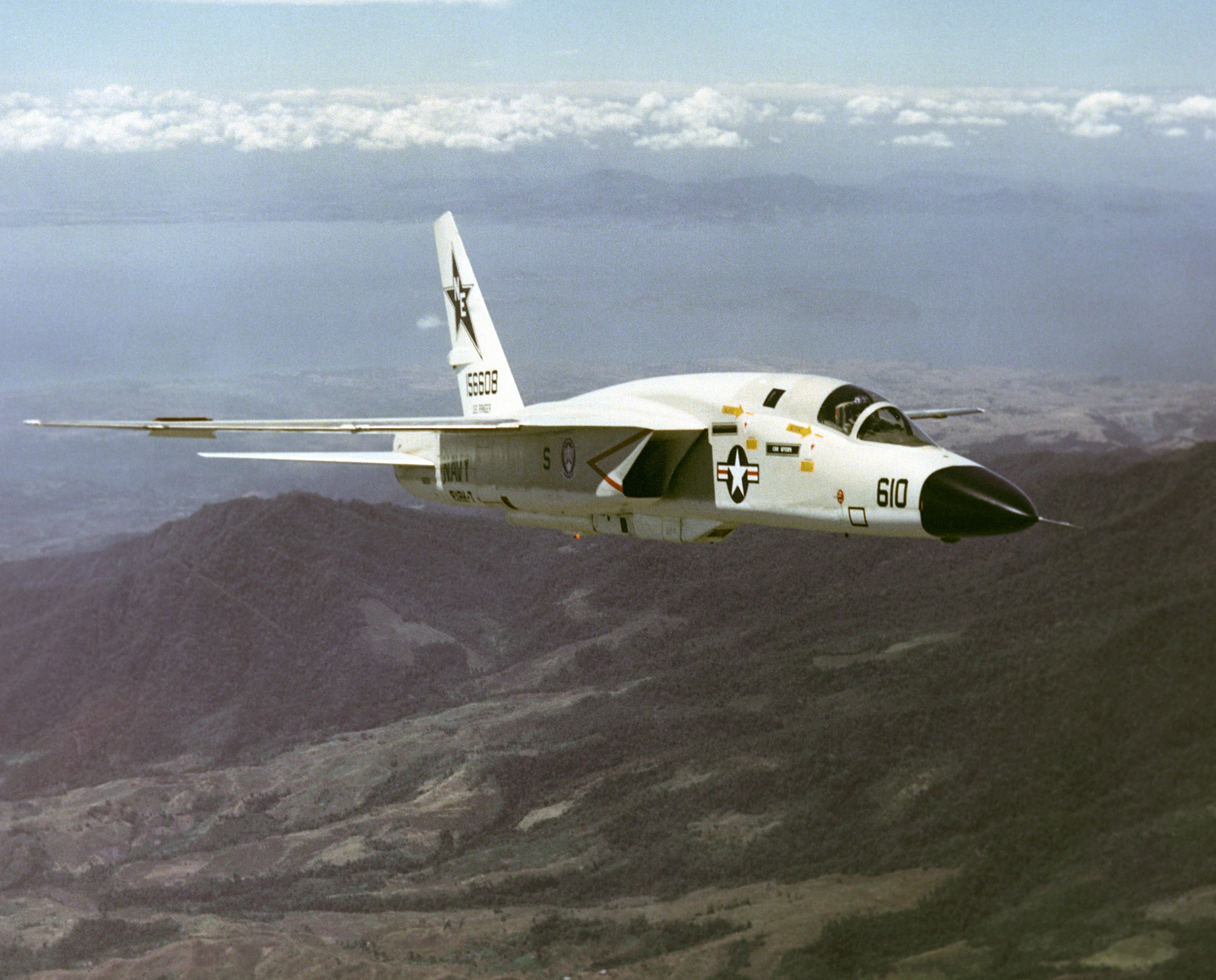
RVAH-7 RA-5C Vigilante, BuNo 156608, c. 1979. This aircraft is now on permanent display at Naval Support Activity Mid-South (formerly Naval Air Station Memphis), Tennessee.

=== VC-7 ===
VC-7 was established at Naval Air Station Moffett Field, California in October 1950 and was initially equipped with the AJ-1 Savage for a primary mission role of carrier-based nuclear strike against strategic targets ashore.

The squadron subsequently executed a change of home stations to Naval Air Station Patuxent River, Maryland in 1951 and later transitioned to the AJ-2 Savage. On 1 July 1955, the squadron was redesignated as VAH-7 and another change of home station, this time to NAAS Sanford, Florida, followed later that same year.

=== VAH-7 ===
With the impending replacement of the AJ-1 and AJ-2 with the new A3D Skywarrior, Naval Auxiliary Air Station Sanford was the focus of extensive military construction during the mid and late 1950s, all intended to upgrade the installation to full naval air station status as a Master Jet Base and resulting in its redesignation as Naval Air Station Sanford.

VAH-7 exchanged its AJ-2 Savages for A3D-2 Skywarriors in early 1958. However, VAH-7's association with the Douglas heavy attack aircraft lasted only a little over three years, during which time only a partial deployment was made when some VAH-7 aircraft and crews supplemented VAH-1 aboard the USS Independence as VAH-7 began its transition to the supersonic North American A3J-1 Vigilante in August 1961.

The operational debut of the Vigilante took place in August 1962 when VAH-7 deployed aboard the newly-commissioned nuclear-powered aircraft carrier USS Enterprise for a short 38-day cruise in the Mediterranean. In September, with the establishment of a common DoD-wide aircraft designation system, the A3J-1 was redesignated as the A-5A Vigilante. In October, this short cruise was extended beyond its originally-scheduled duration due to the Cuban Missile Crisis, with VAH-7 remaining embarked aboard Enterprise as the carrier steamed as a show of force in Caribbean waters near Cuba.

From 6 February 1963 to 4 September 1963, VAH-7 completed a full deployment to the Mediterranean with the A-5A while embarked aboard Enterprise in support of the U.S. Sixth Fleet. The following year, following only a five month turnaround period at Naval Air Station Sanford, VAH-7 deployed again aboard Enterprise, this time from 8 February to 3 October 1964 as part of Operation Sea Orbit, a round-the-world cruise by Task Force 1, a nuclear-powered task force consisting of Enterprise, the nuclear-powered guided missile cruiser USS Long Beach, and the nuclear-powered guided missile destroyer leader USS Bainbridge.

As the submarine-launched ballistic missile became the primary Navy strategic nuclear deterrent, the Navy concluded that it no longer needed carrier-based strategic bombers and that Naval Aviation's strike arm would remain strictly a tactical force. Having been designed as a supersonic nuclear strike bomber, aircraft such as the A-5A no longer had a mission, and in 1963 the Navy decided to halt any further procurement of the A-5A and the follow-on A-5B. However, in lieu of prematurely retiring the Vigilante, it was deemed that it would be reconfigured as a dedicated multi-sensor reconnaissance platform under the designation RA-5C.

Following its return from Operation Sea Orbit, the squadron commenced transitioning to the RA-5C and the Peacemakers were redesignated as RVAH-7 on 1 December 1964.

=== RVAH-7 / Vietnam ===
- 26 October 1965 – 20 June 1966, RVAH-7 embarked aboard USS Enterprise for a Western Pacific (WESTPAC) and Vietnam deployment.
  - On 16 December 1965, RA-5C BuNo 151633 was lost in combat; both crewmen ejected and were rescued.
- 19 November 1966 – 6 July 1967, RVAH-7 embarked aboard USS Enterprise for a WESTPAC and Vietnam deployment.
  - On 12 February 1967, RA-5C BuNo 151623 was lost in combat; both crewmen ejected successfully and were rescued.
  - Budgetary pressures of the Vietnam War force the Department of Defense to close several stateside air bases, to include Naval Air Station Sanford. Following their 1967 deployment
    and prior to their 1969 deployment, RVAH-7 shifts home stations from NAS Sanford to the former Turner Air Force Base, renamed Naval Air Station Albany, Georgia.
- 11 August 1969 – 8 May 1970, RVAH-7 embarked aboard USS Constellation for a WESTPAC and Vietnam deployment.
- 17 February – 28 November 1972, RVAH-7 embarked aboard USS Kitty Hawk for a WESTPAC and Vietnam deployment.
  - On 7 May 1972, RA-5C BuNo 151618 was lost in combat. Both crewmen, the pilot and RVAH-7 Executive Officer, Commander C. R. "Ron" Polfer, and the reconnaissance attack navigator, Lieutenant (junior grade) Joe Kernan, successfully ejected and were captured as POWs by the North Vietnamese. Both were repatriated to the United States on 28 March 1973.

=== RVAH-7 / Cold War ===
- 23 November 1973 – 9 July 1974, RVAH-7 embarked aboard USS Kitty Hawk for a WESTPAC deployment.
  - Budgetary pressures following the end of the Vietnam War force the Department of Defense to again close several stateside air bases, to include Naval Air Station Albany.
    In late 1974, RVAH-1 shifts home stations from NAS Albany to Naval Air Station Key West, Florida.
- 5 March - 22 September 1975, RVAH-7 embarked aboard USS Forrestal for a Mediterranean deployment.
- 25 October 1977 – 15 May 1978, RVAH-7 embarked aboard USS Kitty Hawk for a WESTPAC deployment. This would be the last deployment of the RA-5C aboard Kitty Hawk.
- 21 February - 22 September 1979, RVAH-7 embarked aboard USS Ranger. This would be the final overseas deployment for RVAH-7 and the final overseas deployment for the RA-5C.
  - At the conclusion of RVAH-7's last deployment, the last catapult launch of an RA-5C took place aboard USS Ranger off the coast of California on 21 September 1979, with the aircraft, NE611, BUNO 156615, returning with two others to their home station of Naval Air Station Key West.

Attrition of airframes and the increasing maintenance and flight hour costs of the RA-5C in a constrained defense budget environment forced the Navy to incrementally retire the RA-5C and sunset the RVAH community beginning in mid-1974. RVAH-7 was the last Fleet RVAH squadron to operate the RA-5C and the last to deploy with it overseas. With the retirement of the RA-5C, carrier-based reconnaissance was conducted by the active duty VFP community at Naval Air Station Miramar and the Naval Reserve VFP community at Andrews AFB / NAF Washington with the RF-8G Crusader while the reconnaissance mission transitioned to the active duty fighter (VF) community utilizing selectively modified F-14A Tomcat aircraft modified with the Tactical Air Reconnaissance Pod System (TARPS). On 29 March 1987, the last RF-8G was retired and the carrier-based reconnaissance mission was fully transferred to the active duty and Naval Reserve VF community at NAS Miramar, Naval Air Station Oceana, Naval Air Station Dallas and NAS JRB Fort Worth as a secondary role with the F-14 Tomcat equipped with the Tactical Air Reconnaissance Pod System (TARPS). The wet film-based TARPS would later be succeeded by Digital TARPS (D-TARPS) that would equip F-14A, F-14B and F-14D aircraft. With the retirement of the F-14, D-TARPS would be replaccd by the Shared Reconnaissance Pod (SHARP) on F/A-18E and F/A-18F Super Hornet aircraft in strike fighter (VFA) squadrons.

Following its return from its final Western Pacific deployment in late 1979, RVAH-7 was disestablished as the last remaining Fleet RVAH squadron at Naval Air Station Key West on 28 September 1979 following nearly 29 years of active service. Upon disestablishment, the RVAH 7 remaining squadron members prepared the last three RA-5C Vigilantes for their final flight. One of the aircraft was flown to Naval Air Station Millington, Tennessee to be set on a pedestal for static display outside the gate of the Air Station. The two remaining aircraft were flown to Naval Air Station China Lake to be used as targets at the China Lake weapons ranges. After nearly 30 years of sitting in the desert, NE611, BUNO 156615 was discovered relatively intact and completely restored in 2012 by the Castle Air Museum restoration team. It is now on display at the Castle Air Museum at the former Castle AFB in Atwater, California.

== Home station assignments ==
The squadron was assigned to these home stations:

- Naval Air Station Moffett Field, California
- Naval Air Station Patuxent River, Maryland
- Naval Air Station Whidbey Island, Washington
- Naval Air Station Sanford, Florida
- Naval Air Station Albany, Georgia
- Naval Air Station Key West, Florida

== Aircraft Assigned ==
- AJ-1 / AJ-2 Savage
- A3D-2 Skywarrior
- A3J-1 / A-5A Vigilante
- RA-5C Vigilante

== See also ==
- Reconnaissance aircraft
- List of inactive United States Navy aircraft squadrons
- History of the United States Navy
