= Alpha 5 =

Alpha 5 (α5), Alpha-5 (α-5) or Alpha Five may refer to:

- Alpha 5 (Robert Silverberg anthology), a science fiction anthology edited by Robert Silverberg first published in 1974
- Alpha 5 (Power Rangers), a fictional character from the Power Rangers franchise
- Integrin alpha-5, a protein encoded by the ITGA5 gen in humans
- Alpha-5 beta-1 (α5β1), an integrin that binds to matrix macromolecules and proteinases and thereby stimulates angiogenesis
- Alpha 5 (Minolta) (α-5), an A-mount 35mm SLR by Minolta in 2001, also known as Dynax 5 / Maxxum 5 / Alpha Sweet II
- Alpha-5 Digital (α-5D), an A-mount APS-C format DSLR by Konica Minolta in 2005, also known as Dynax 5D / Maxxum 5D / Alpha Sweet Digital (DG-5D)
- Alfa 5, a private security company in Angola
- DeLorean Alpha5, an electric concept sports car

Alpha V (αV) or Alpha-V (α-V) may refer to:

- Integrin alpha-V, a protein encoded by the ITGAV gen in humans
- Alpha-v beta-5 (αVβ5), an integrin that binds to matrix macromolecules and proteinases and thereby stimulates angiogenesis
- Laminin, alpha 5, a protein that in humans is encoded by the LAMA5 gen

== See also ==
- Sony Alpha NEX-5 (α NEX-5)
- A5 (disambiguation)
- Alpha (disambiguation)
