= Buzz number =

USAF aircraft identification

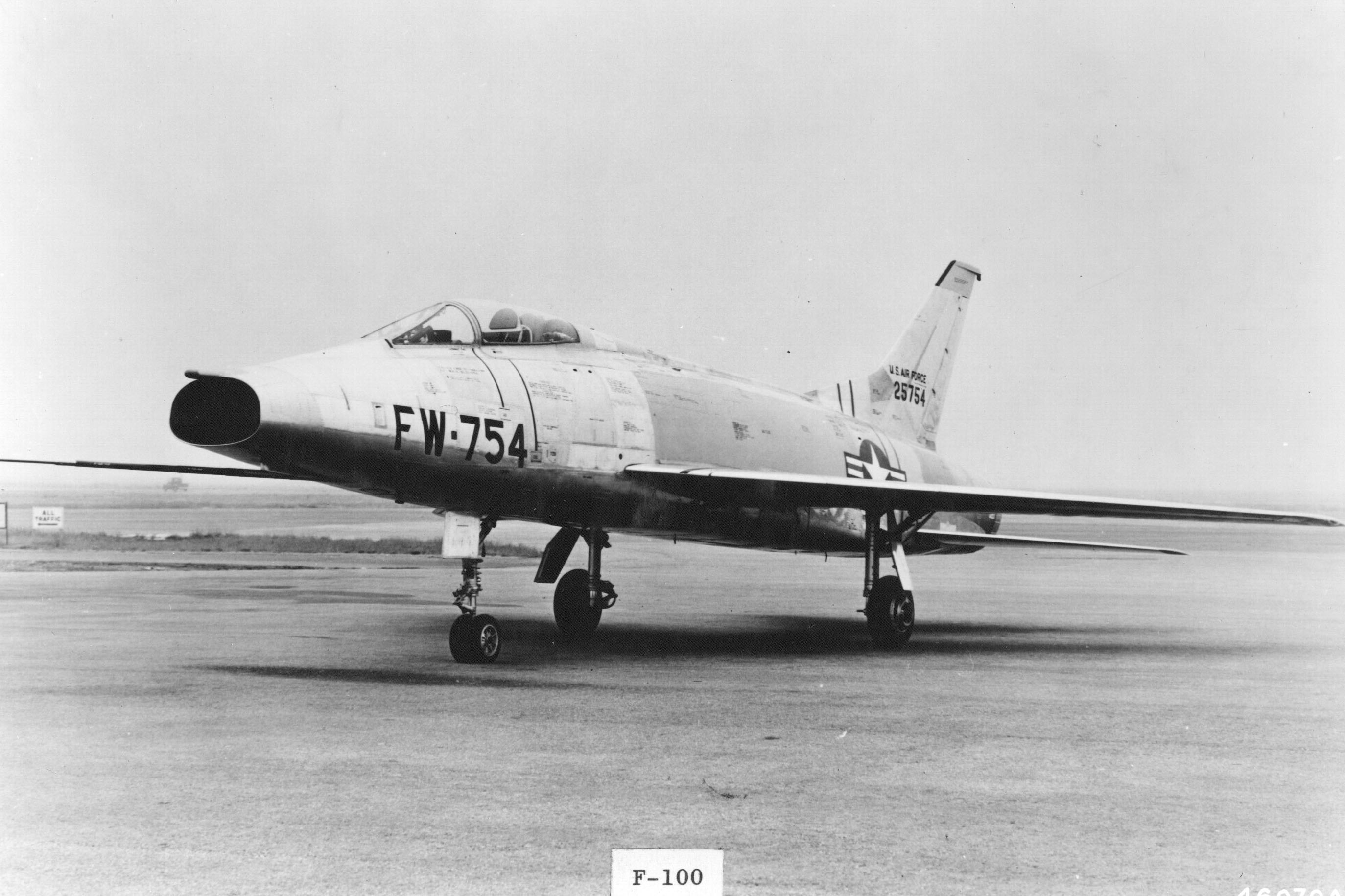
This F-100 has the buzz number "FW-754" on its nose.

Buzz numbers were letter-number combinations displayed by United States Air Force military aircraft in the years immediately after World War II, through the early 1960s.

The first two letters of a buzz number indicated the type and designation of an aircraft while the last three were generally the last three digits of the aircraft serial number. If there was more than one aircraft of the same type with the same last three digits, the additional aircraft were given a sequence letter after the number, for example FS-143-A.

Air Force fighters used buzz numbers starting with the letter F (or P, when fighters were designated as "pursuit" aircraft before June 1948), while bombers started with the letter B. For example, a P-51 Mustang would have a buzz number such as FF-230 while an F-86 Sabre might be FU-910. A B-66 Destroyer would have a buzz number such as BB-222. One of the last Air Force fighters to carry a buzz number was the F-4 Phantom II (FJ), then called the F-110 Spectre by the Air Force.

== List of buzz codes ==
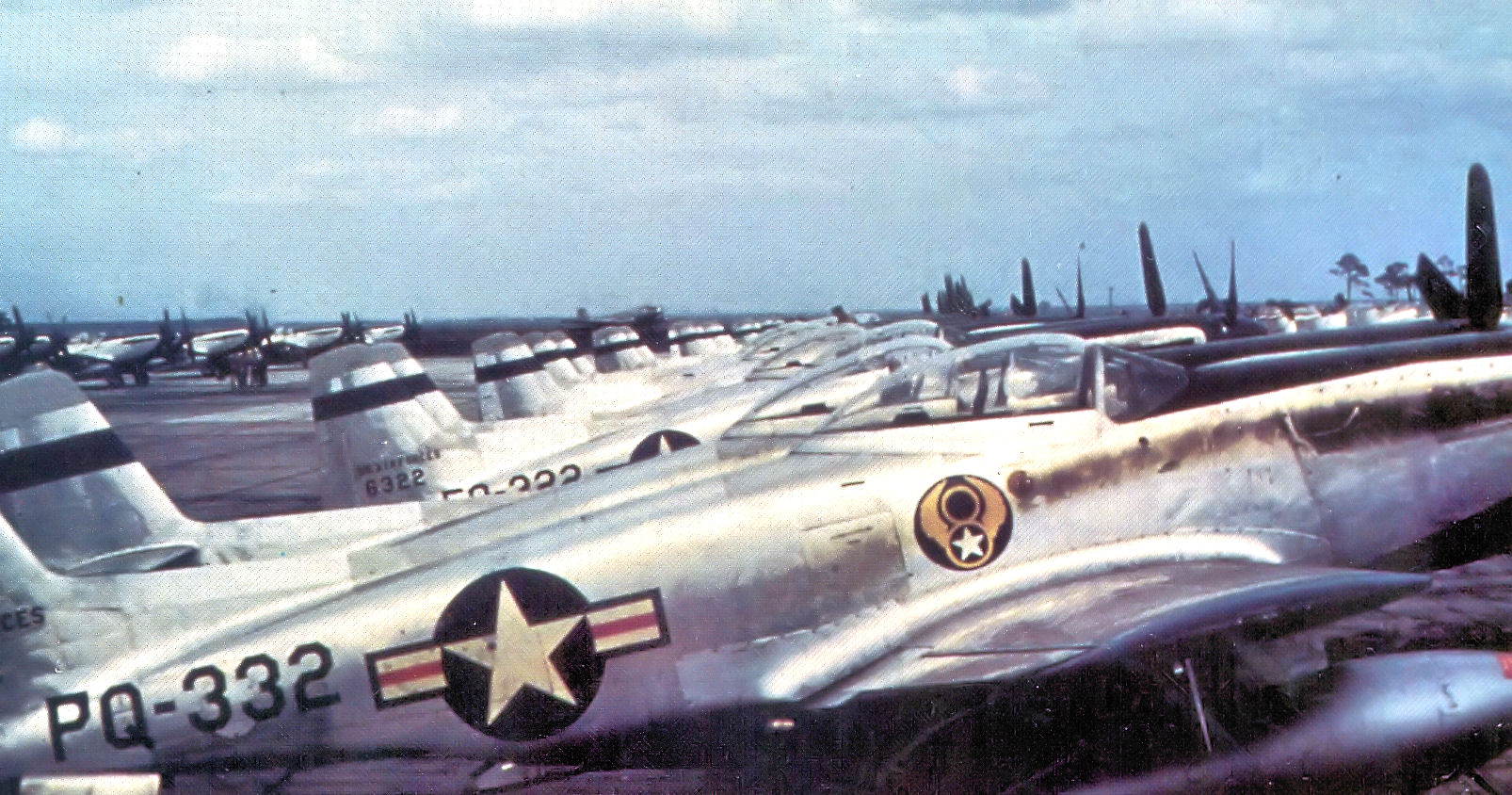
A P-82 Twin Mustang with a buzz number near its tail

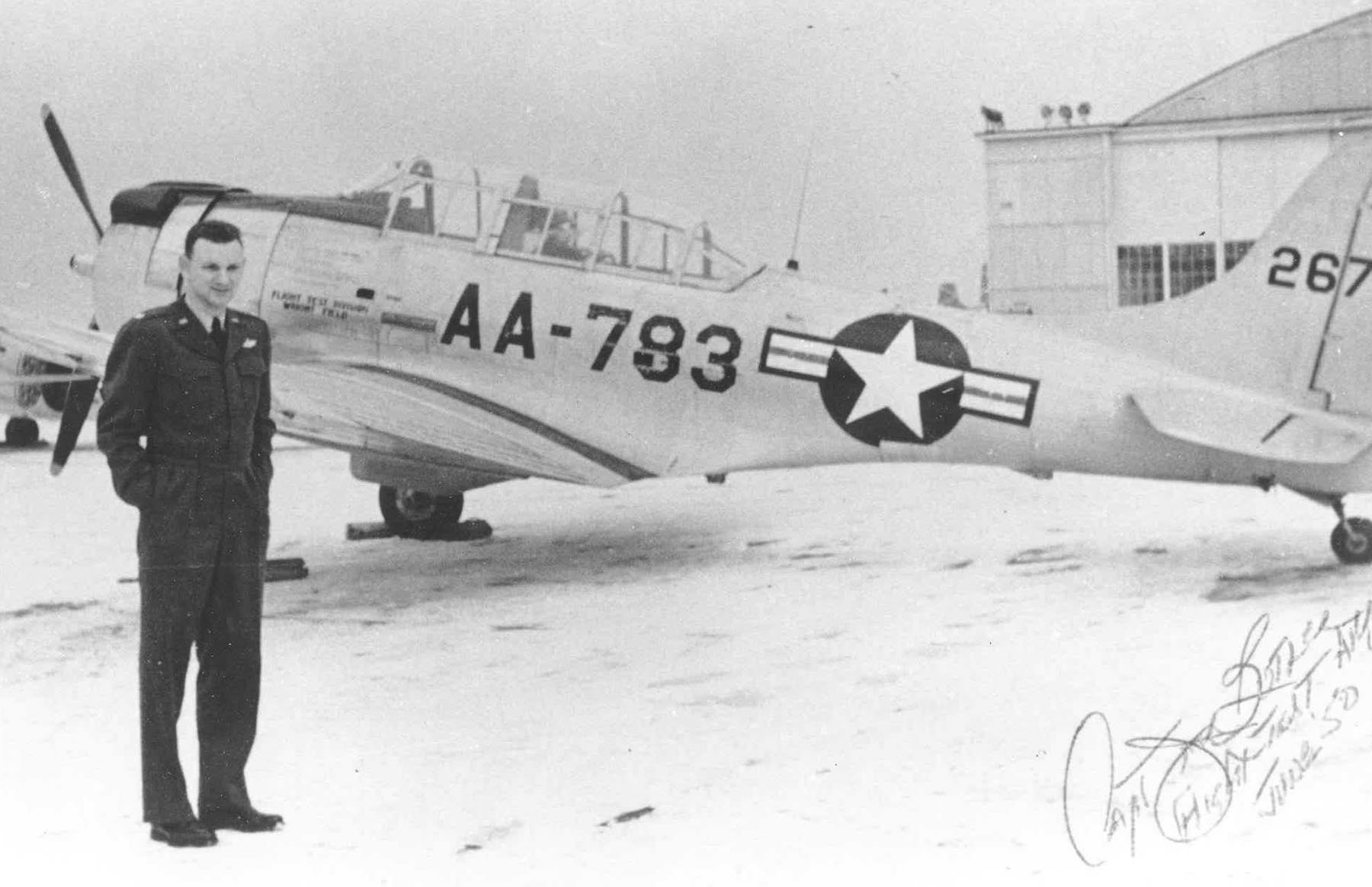
Douglas F-24 Banshee in 1950, with 'AA' buzz number

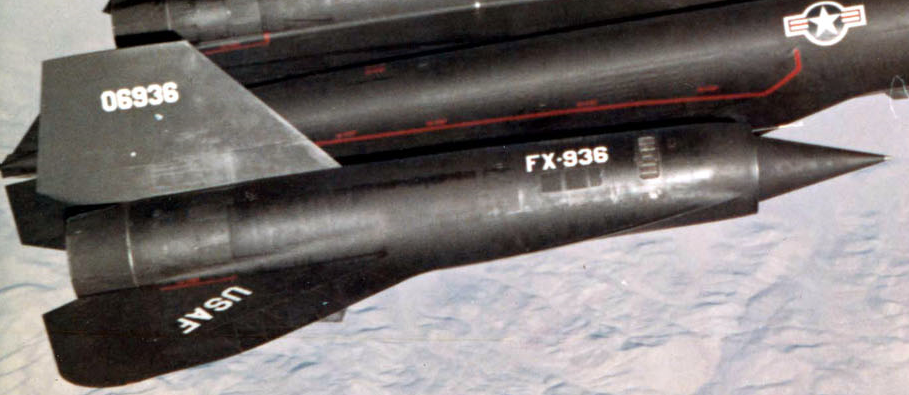
'FX-' code on Lockheed YF-12; possibly the last buzz number

This table lists U.S. Air Force and U.S. Army aircraft by buzz-number prefix. Note that some aircraft types changed prefixes during their career, while other prefixes were re-used after an earlier type was retired.

Code name	Manufacturer	Aircraft	Notes
AA	Douglas	A-24/F-24 Banshee	
AB	Curtiss	A-25 Shrike	
AC	Douglas	A-26 Invader	recoded BC in 1948
AD	Vultee	A-31 Vengeance	
AE	Convair	XA-41	
BA	Boeing	B-17 Flying Fortress	
BA	Martin	B-57 Canberra	
BB	Douglas	XB-19	
BB	Douglas	B-66 Destroyer	
BC	Consolidated	B-24 Liberator	
BC	Douglas	B-26 Invader	originally AC
BD	North American	B-25 Mitchell	
BE	North American	B-45 Tornado	recoded BH in 1948
BF	Boeing	B-29 Superfortress	
BG	Consolidated	B-32 Dominator	
BG	Northrop	XB-35	
BH	Lockheed	B-37 Ventura	
BH	North American	B-45 Tornado	originally BE
BJ	Boeing	XB-39 Superfortress	
BK	Douglas	XB-42 Mixmaster	
BK	Boeing	B-50 Superfortress	
BL	Boeing	XB-44 Superfortress	
BM	Convair	B-36 Peacemaker	
CA	Beechcraft	CQ-3 Expeditor	
CA	Douglas	C-124 Globemaster II	
CB	Beechcraft	UC-43 Traveler	
CC	Beechcraft	C-45 Expeditor	
CD	Curtiss	C-46 Commando	
CE	Douglas	C-47 Skytrain	
CF	Douglas	C-48	
CG	Douglas	C-49	
CH	Douglas	C-53 Skytrooper	
CJ	Douglas	C-54 Skymaster	
CK	Lockheed	C-60 Lodestar	
CL	Noorduyn	UC-64 Norseman	
CM	Lockheed	C-69 Constellation	
CN	Douglas	C-74 Globemaster	
CP	Cessna	UC-78 Bobcat	
CP	Convair	C-131 Samaritan	
CQ	Fairchild	C-82 Packet	
CQ	Fairchild	C-119 Flying Boxcar	
CR	Consolidated	C-87 Liberator Express	
CS	Boeing	C-97 Stratofreighter/KC-97 Stratofreighter	
CT	Convair	XC-99	
CU	Douglas	C-117 Skytrooper	
CV	Douglas	C-118 Liftmaster	
CW	Lockheed	C-121 Constellation	
CY	Chase	YC-122 Avitruc	
CZ	Chase	C-123 Provider	
CZ	Fairchild	C-123 Provider	
FA	Beechcraft	F-2 Expeditor	cancelled 1948
FB	Lockheed	F-5 Lightning	cancelled 1948
FC	North American	F-6 Mustang	cancelled 1948, to FF
FD	Consolidated	F-7 Liberator	cancelled 1948
FE	Boeing	F-9 Flying Fortress	cancelled 1948, to BA
FF	North American	F-10 Mitchell	cancelled 1948, to BD
FG	Boeing	F-13 Superfortress	cancelled 1948, to BF
FH	Northrop	F-15 Reporter	cancelled 1948, to FK
F	Northrop	N-156F	
FA	Lockheed	F-38 Lightning	previously PA
FA	Lockheed	F-94 Starfire	
FA	Northrop	F-5 Freedom Fighter	
FB	Bell	F-39 Airacobra	previously PB
FB	McDonnell	F-101 Voodoo	
FC	Curtiss	F-40 Warhawk	previously PC
FC	Convair	F-102 Delta Dagger	
FD	Republic	XF-103	
FE	Republic	F-47 Thunderbolt	previously PE
FE	Convair	F-106 Delta Dart	
FF	North American	F-51 Mustang	previously PF
FG	Lockheed	F-104 Starfighter	
FH	Republic	F-105 Thunderchief	
FJ	Bell	F-59 Airacomet	previously PJ
FJ	McDonnell	F-110 Spectre	
FK	Northrop	F-61 Black Widow	previously PK
FL	Bell	F-63 Kingcobra	previously PL
FN	Lockheed	F-80 Shooting Star	previously PL, recoded FT
FP	Convair	XF-81	previously PP
FQ	North American	F-82 Twin Mustang	previously PQ
FR	Bell	XF-83	previously PR
FS	Republic	F-84 Thunderjet	previously PS
FT	Lockheed	F-80 Shooting Star	previously PN, FN
QFT	Lockheed	QF-80 Shooting Star	
FU	North American	F-86 Sabre	previously PU
FV	Northrop	Northrop F-89 Scorpion	
FW	North American	F-100 Super Sabre	
FX	Lockheed	YF-12 Blackbird	Unofficial?
FY	North American	YF-93	
FY	North American	YF-95	recoded FU
GA	Waco	PG-2	
GB	Waco	PG-3	
GC	Waco	CG-4	
GD	Laister-Kauffman	XCG-10 Trojan Horse	
GE	Waco	CG-13	
GF	Chase	YCG-14	
GG	Waco	CG-15	
GH	Chase	XCG-18	
GJ	Chase	XCG-20	
JT	Cessna	YAT-37D	
LA	Taylorcraft	L-2 Grasshopper	
LA	Piper	L-4 Grasshopper	originally LC
LB	Aeronca	L-3 Grasshopper	
LB	Stinson	L-5 Sentinel	originally LD
LC	Piper	L-4 Grasshopper	recoded LA
LC	Aeronca	L-16	originally LH
LB	Stinson	L-5 Sentinel	recoded LB
LD	Ryan	L-17B/U-18B Navion	See LJ for North American L-17A/C, U-18A/C
LE	Interstate	L-6 Cadet	
LE	Boeing	L-15 Scout	
LE	Piper	L-18 Super Cub	
LF	Piper	L-14	
LF	Cessna	L-19 Bird Dog	
LG	Convair	L-13 Grasshopper	
LG	de Havilland Canada	L-20 Beaver	
LH	Aeronca	L-16	recoded LC
LH	Piper	L-21 Super Cub	
LJ	North American	L-17A/C, U-18A/C Navion	See LD for Ryan L-17B, U-18B
LJ	Beechcraft	L-23 Seminole	
LK	Aero Commander	L-26	
OA	Grumman	OA-9 Goose	
OB	Consolidated	OA-10 Catalina	
OC	North American	O-47	
OD	Kellett	YO-60	
OE	Boeing	PB2B-1 Catalina	
PA	Lockheed	P-38 Lightning	recoded FA in 1948
PB	Bell	P-39 Airacobra	recoded FB in 1948
PC	Curtiss	P-40 Warhawk	recoded FC in 1948
PD	Curtiss	XP-42	
PE	Republic	P-47 Thunderbolt	recoded FE in 1948
PF	North American	P-51 Mustang	recoded FF in 1948
PG	Curtiss	XP-55 Ascender	
PH	Lockheed	XP-58 Chain Lightning	
PJ	Bell	P-59 Airacomet	recoded FJ in 1948
PK	Northrop	P-61 Black Widow	recoded FK in 1948
PL	Bell	P-63 Kingcobra	recoded FL in 1948
PM	Fisher	P-75 Eagle	
PN	Lockheed	P-80 Shooting Star	recoded FT in 1948
PP	Convair	XP-81	recoded FP in 1948
PQ	North American	P-82 Twin Mustang	recoded FQ in 1948
PR	Bell	XP-83	recoded FR in 1948
PS	Republic	P-84 Thunderjet	recoded FS in 1948
PU	North American	P-86 Sabre	recoded FU in 1948
QF	Piasecki	H-21 Workhorse	
QK	Culver	Q-14 Cadet	
RF	North American	RF-51 Mustang	
TA	North American	AT-6 Texan	
LTA	North American	LT-6G Texan	
TB	Beechcraft	AT-7 Navigator	
TC	Beechcraft	AT-11 Kansan	
TC	Mikoyan-Gurevich	MiG-15	
TC	Convair	TF-102 Delta Dagger	
TD	Fairchild	AT-21 Gunner	
TD	Beechcraft	T-34 Mentor	
BTE	Vultee	BT-13 Valiant	
TE	Cessna	T-37 Tweet	
PTF	Boeing	PT-13 Kaydet	
TF	North American	TF-51 Mustang	
TF	Northrop	T-38 Talon	
TG	Boeing	PT-17 Kaydet	
TG	Lockheed	TF-104 Starfighter	
TG	North American	T-39 Sabreliner	
TH	Fairchild	PT-19	
TJ	Culver	PQ-8 Cadet	
TK	Culver	PQ-14 Cadet	
TL	North American	T-28 Trojan	
TP	Convair	T-29 Flying Classroom	
TQ	Fairchild	T-31	
TR	Lockheed	T-33 Shooting Star	
UG	de Havilland Canada	U-6 Beaver	
UH	Piper	U-7 Super Cub	
UK	Aero Commander	U-4/U-9	
YF	North American	YF-93	
YT	Cessna	YAT-37D	

== See also ==
- Tail code
- United States military aircraft serials
