= Stroukoff =

Stroukoff can be:

- Andrew Stroukoff (born 1950) American ice dancer
- Michael Stroukoff (1883–1973) Russian-born American aircraft designer
- Stroukoff Aircraft a former American aircraft company
