= Chase XC-123A =

Experimental transport aircraft

XC-123A
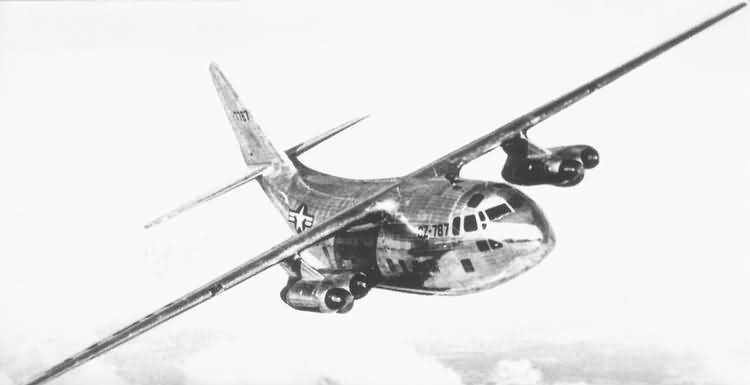

General information
- Other name: Jet Avitruc
- Type: Military transport aircraft
- Manufacturer: Chase Aircraft
- Designer: Michael Stroukoff
- Primary user: United States Air Force
- Number built: 1
- Serial: 47-787

History
- First flight: 21 April 1951
- Developed from: Chase XCG-20
- Fate: Converted to YC-123D 53-8068

The Chase XC-123A was an experimental transport aircraft developed by Chase Aircraft. The first jet-powered transport built for the United States Air Force, it was intended for use as a high-speed transport for high-priority cargo and personnel. The XC-123A was determined to have insufficient advantages over existing types in service, and did not go into production. The sole prototype was converted into the piston-powered Stroukoff YC-123D to evaluate boundary layer control systems.

== Design and development ==
In the late 1940s, Chase Aircraft had developed the XG-20, the largest glider ever built in the United States. By the time it was ready for operations, however, U.S. military doctrine had been altered to remove the requirement for the use of transport gliders in combat.

However, the XG-20's aircraft had been designed to allow for the easy installation of power plants, and Chase modified the two prototypes into powered aircraft, one becoming the XC-123, with twin piston engines. The second XG-20, however, was taken in hand for a more radical reconfiguration, being fitted with two twin-jet engine pods, of the type used by the Convair B-36 and Boeing B-47 bombers, to become the XC-123A. As there was no provision for housing fuel in the former glider's wings, fuel tanks were installed underneath the cabin floor.

== Operational history ==
Dubbed "Avitruc" by its manufacturer, the XC-123A conducted its maiden flight on April 21, 1951, becoming the first jet-powered transport aircraft to successfully fly in the United States. It was considered "excellent" in flight trials, with the aircraft showing few vices, and demonstrating reasonably good short-field capability.

Despite this, even as the XC-123 proved successful, the XC-123A failed to win sufficient favor in flight testing to receive a production order. Although the aircraft's short-field performance was good, on rough, unimproved fields the low-slung jet pods would suck debris into the intakes, damaging the engines. In addition, the aircraft's design was mismatched to its engines, resulting in the XC-123A being incapable of providing sufficient cargo capacity compared to the amount of fuel its jet engines required. As a result, the XC-123A project was abandoned without additional aircraft being built.

Following the conclusion of trials, the XC-123A was converted to be powered by two Pratt & Whitney R-2800 radial engines, and was used for boundary layer control trials as the Stroukoff YC-123D, receiving serial number 53-8068.

== Specifications (XC-123A) ==
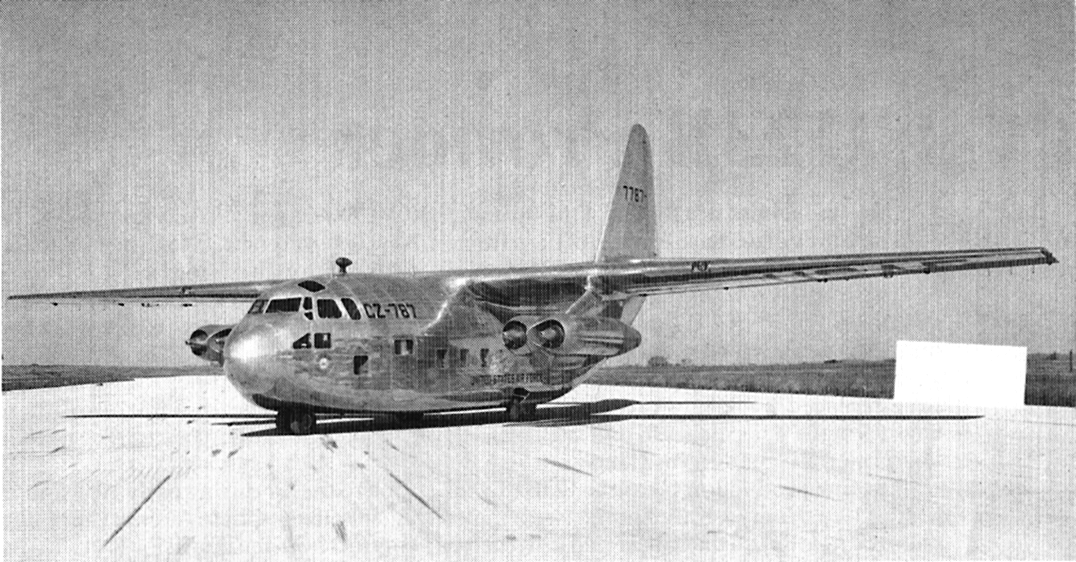
The XC-123A

Data from Gunston and Adcock

General characteristics

- Crew: 3
- Length: 77 ft 1 in (23.50 m)
- Wingspan: 110 ft 0 in (33.53 m)
- Height: 33 ft 10 in (10.31 m)
- Wing area: 1,222.78 sq ft (113.600 m^{2})
- Airfoil: NACA 23017
- Empty weight: 25,000 lb (11,340 kg)
- Max takeoff weight: 60,000 lb (27,216 kg)
- Powerplant: 4 × General Electric J47-GE-11 turbojets, 5,200 lbf (23 kN) thrust each

Performance

- Maximum speed: 500 mph (800 km/h, 430 kn)
- Cruise speed: 400 mph (640 km/h, 350 kn)

== See also ==
Related development

- Chase XCG-20
- Fairchild C-123 Provider
- Stroukoff YC-134

Aircraft of comparable role, configuration, and era

- Avro Ashton
- Avro Canada C102 Jetliner
- Vickers Type 618 Nene-Viking

Related lists

- List of military aircraft of the United States
