= CG-20 =

CG-20 may refer to:

- Chase XCG-20, the largest military glider ever built in the United States
- USS Richmond K. Turner (CG-20), a Leahy-class guided missile cruiser of the United States Navy
