= CG-17 =

CG-17 may refer to:

- Douglas XCG-17, a conversion of the American C-47 Skytrain transport as an assault glider
- USS Harry E. Yarnell (CG-17), Leahy-class guided missile cruiser of the United States Navy
