= Chase Aircraft =

American aircraft manufacturer

Chase Aircraft Company
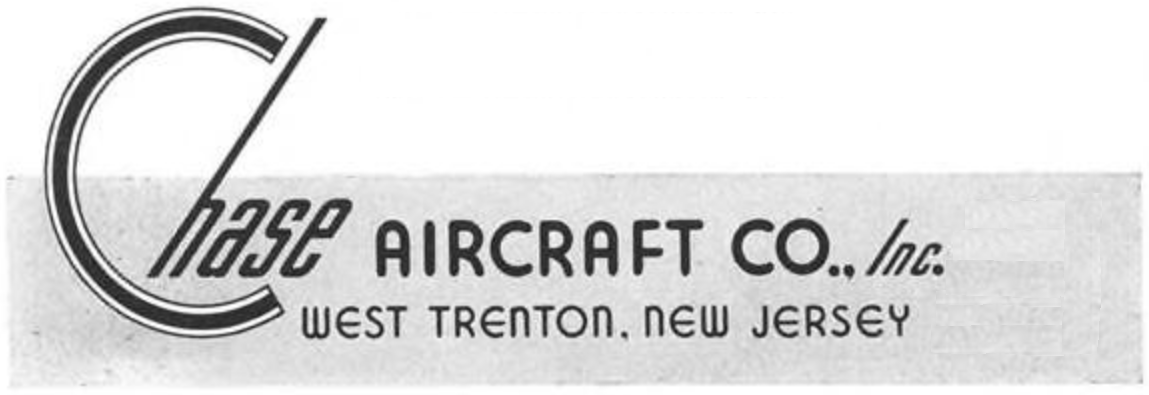
- Industry: Aircraft manufacturing
- Founded: 1943
- Founder: Michael Stroukoff
- Defunct: 1954
- Fate: Acquired by Kaiser-Frazer
- Successor: Stroukoff Aircraft
- Headquarters: Trenton, New Jersey, United States
- Products: YC-122, C-123

The Chase Aircraft Company, founded in 1943, was an American aircraft manufacturer, primarily constructing assault gliders and military transport aircraft. Lacking space for expansion, the company was purchased by Henry J. Kaiser in 1951. Plans to produce the C-123 transport for the United States Air Force collapsed amid scandal, and the company closed in 1953. A successor company, Stroukoff Aircraft, continued experimental work for several years before closing in 1959.

== Early products ==
Founded in New York, New York, in 1943 with Michael Stroukoff, a Russian émigré, as president and chief designer, Chase's first aircraft design was the XCG-14 assault glider, produced for the U.S. Army Air Forces and first flying in January 1945. Development of improved, enlarged versions of the aircraft continued over the next two years, with the company moving to Trenton, New Jersey, in 1946, before the XCG-14 was superseded by the XG-18, an even larger and heavier aircraft that was the world's first all-metal transport glider.

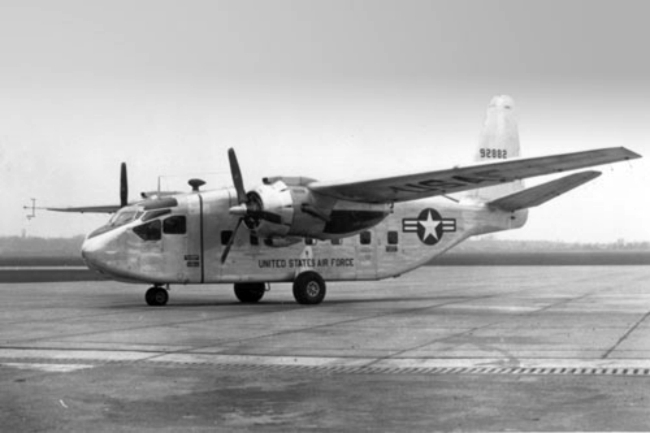
A Chase YC-122

By 1949, the United States Air Force had determined that the glider was no longer a viable weapon on the battlefield, and the XG-18 was modified, being fitted with a pair of radial engines. Redesignated as the YC-122 Avitruc, three prototype and one pre-production aircraft were produced. Despite favorable evaluations, the Air Force had reconsidered its requirement for small transports, and decided not to proceed with full production of the design. One YC-122 was later modified into the Hiller X-18, an experimental tiltwing VTOL aircraft.

== XG-20 and the first jet transport ==
A third, still larger, assault glider had been designed by Stroukoff, the XG-20, the largest glider ever built in the United States and the last combat glider to be constructed for the U.S. military. By the time the XG-20 was ready for flight testing, gliders had been determined to be obsolete as weapons of war, and so the two aircraft were taken aside for modification. The first prototype XG-20 was fitted with twin radial engines of a larger, more powerful type than those fitted to the YC-122, and was redesignated the XC-123.

The second prototype XG-20, following public display in early 1950 at Pope AFB during Exercise Swarmer, was taken aside for a more radical transformation, being fitted with two twin bomber engine pods containing J47 turbojets, and flying in early 1951 as the XC-123A, the United States' first jet-powered transport aircraft.

== Kaiser and the pricing scandal ==
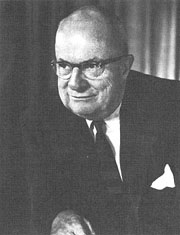
Henry J. Kaiser

While the XC-123A proved too uneconomical for production, the XC-123 had greatly impressed the Air Force, which issued an order for five pre-production aircraft, designated C-123B. The prospect of large follow-up orders raised an issue of capacity, as Chase's factory lacked sufficient space to construct large numbers of aircraft. Therefore, in 1951, 49 percent of Chase was purchased by Kaiser-Frazer, who received a contract for 300 C-123B aircraft to be constructed at Kaiser's Willow Run factory in Ann Arbor, Michigan. Chase became an engineering shop for the company, with Stroukoff remaining with the facility as its chief engineer.

As the first eight aircraft were under construction by Kaiser, the United States Senate was conducting a series of hearings regarding the company, concerns having been raised over subcontracting work Kaiser-Frazer was performing for Fairchild Aircraft. Kaiser had been awarded an earlier contract as a second source for construction of Fairchild's C-119, and the aircraft produced by Kaiser were proving to be significantly more expensive than those produced by Fairchild. (Note: The C-119s constructed by Kaiser-Frazer cost $1.2 million to build, while those built on Fairchild's production line only cost $260,000.)

The result of the hearings was the cancellation of Kaiser's contracts for the C-119 and the C-123 in June 1953, despite the Air Force having already spent $30 million on preparation for production of the C-123, with another $40 million having been earmarked for use by Chase Aircraft directly for production of parts. The C-123 contract was put out for re-bid, with Fairchild the winning contractor. Under Fairchild's name, the C-123 had a large production run and extensive service in the Vietnam War.

== Dissolution ==
Kaiser-Frazer, meanwhile, had bought out the remaining 51% of Chase Aircraft's shares, intending to operate the company as a wholly owned subsidiary of Willys Motors. The sale closed on September 2, 1953, after the cancellation of the Air Force's contracts.

Without the C-123 contract, the new acquisition was no longer considered an asset by Kaiser-Frazer. It announced that the company would be closed down on January 31, 1954. Stroukoff acquired the buildings and remaining assets of Chase, starting his own aircraft company, Stroukoff Aircraft, to conduct further work on experimental versions of the C-123.
