= United States military aircraft serial numbers =

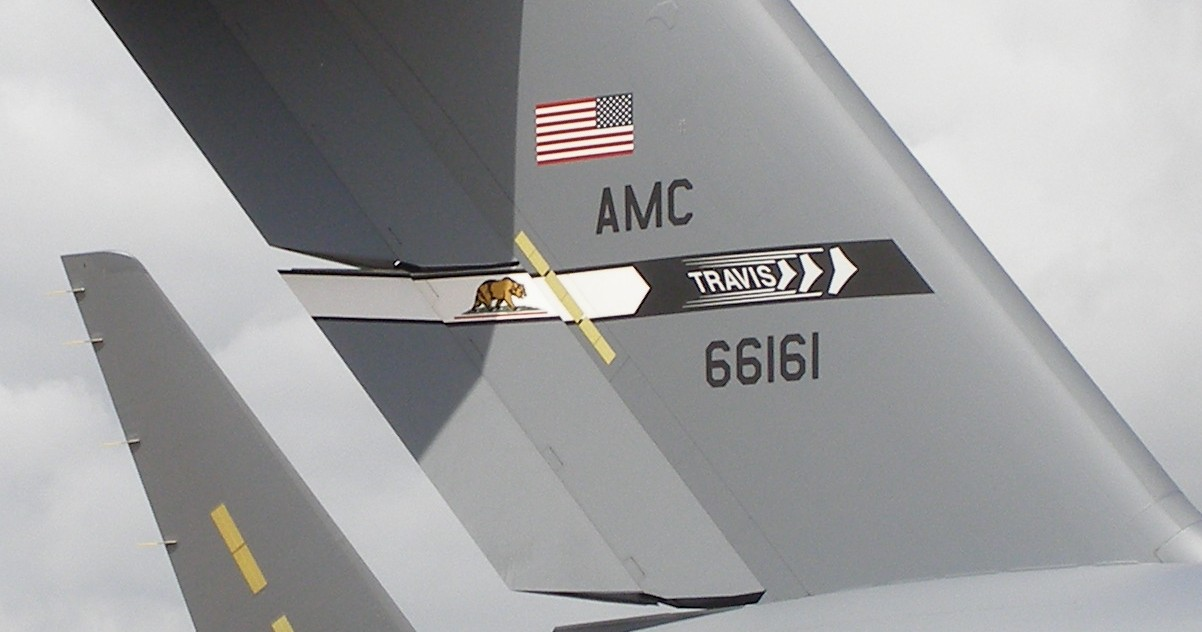
AF Serial Number 06-6161, a Boeing C-17 Globemaster III

In the United States, all military aircraft display a serial number to identify individual aircraft. These numbers are often located on the aircraft tail, so they are sometimes referred to unofficially as "tail numbers". Individual agencies have each evolved their own system of serial number identification. Aircraft serials are part of the Aircraft Visual Identification System, which also includes the aircraft's tail code and Modex.

== History ==
=== United States Army Signal Corps ===
In 1908, the United States government purchased its first heavier than air aircraft. The aircraft, a Wright Model A, was used by the aviation section of the United States Army Signal Corps and was issued with serial number 1. Subsequent aircraft were numbered in sequence.

=== United States Army Air Service ===
In 1918, the aviation section of the Army Air Service became the United States Army Air Service (USAAS), but the sequence of numbers started in 1908 continued without change. In 1920, the USAAS became independent from the Signal Corps, and by 1921 the sequence had reached 68000. On 1 July 1921, a new serial system was introduced that was based on the United States Fiscal Year, which continues to the present day. For example, the first aircraft to be procured with the fiscal year 1960 funds was a Boeing B-52H serialized 60-001.

=== United States Army Air Corps ===
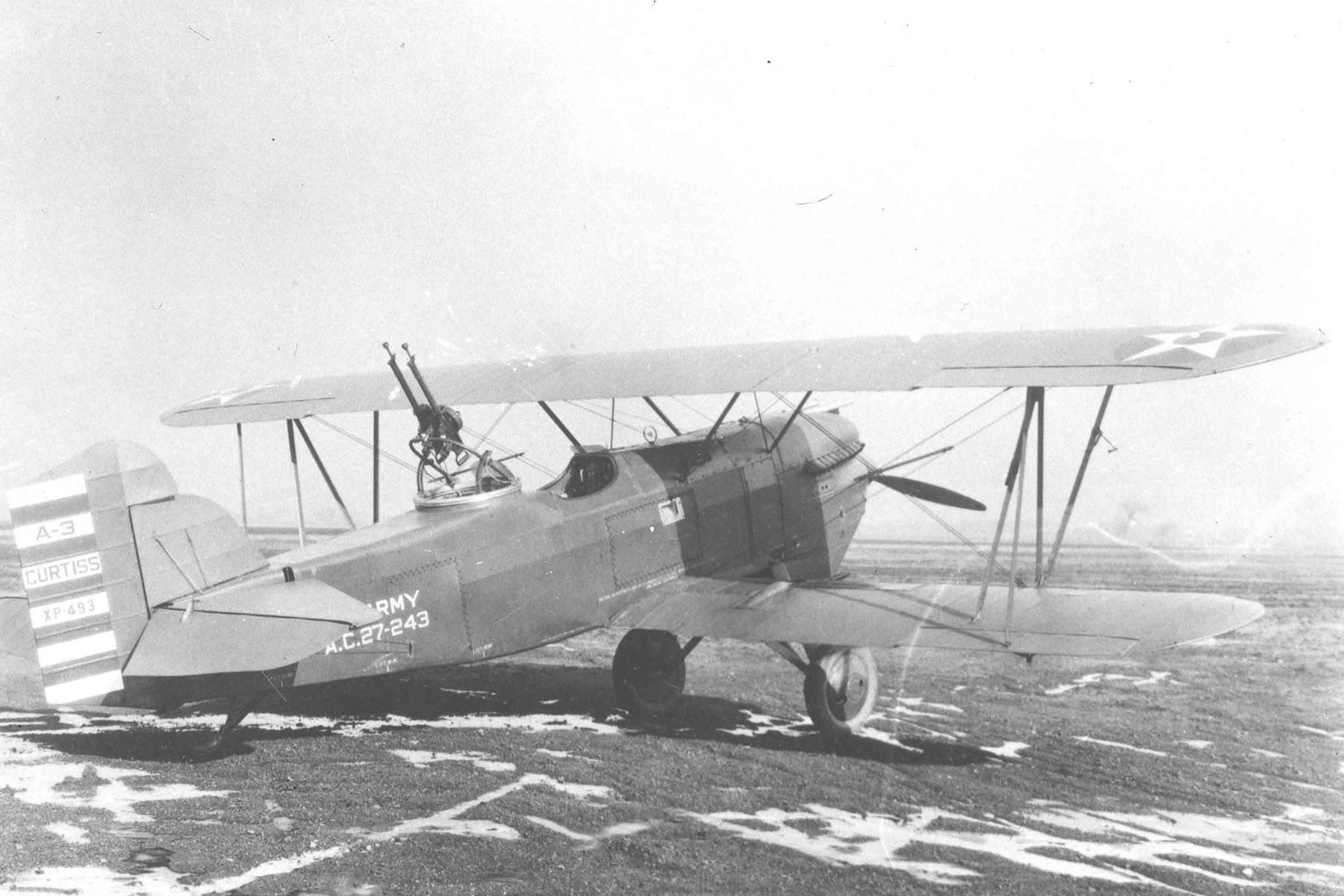
27-243, a Curtiss O-1B Falcon

In 1926, when the USAAS became the United States Army Air Corps (USAAC), the sequence continued unchanged.

=== United States Army Air Forces ===
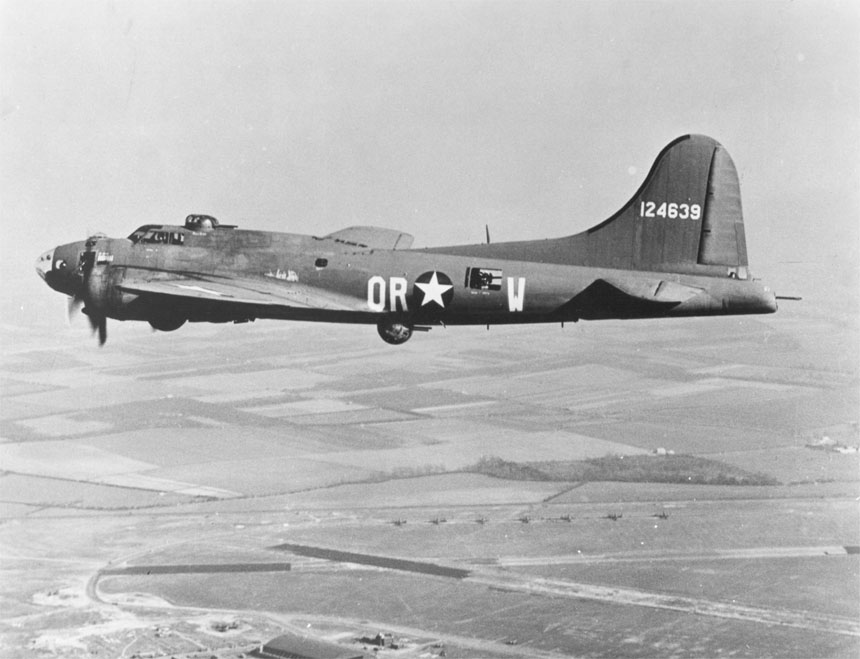
41-24639, a B-17F Flying Fortress, with the first digit of the serial number omitted as shown on the fixed vertical stabilizer

In late June 1941, when the USAAC became the United States Army Air Forces (USAAF), the sequence continued unchanged, and the displayed number, normally shown on the fixed vertical stabilizer's sides, usually omitted the first digit of the year of the contract issuance.

=== United States Air Force ===
In 1947, when the USAAF became the United States Air Force (USAF), the sequence continued unchanged. Although USAF was independent of the Army, Army aircraft continued to be allocated in the same numeric sequence until 1967.

=== United States Army ===
In 1967, the United States Army continued to use the fiscal year serials, but the numeric element was started at 15000 for each year. In 1971, the sequence was started at 20000 and was not restarted with each fiscal year.

=== United States Navy and Marine Corps ===
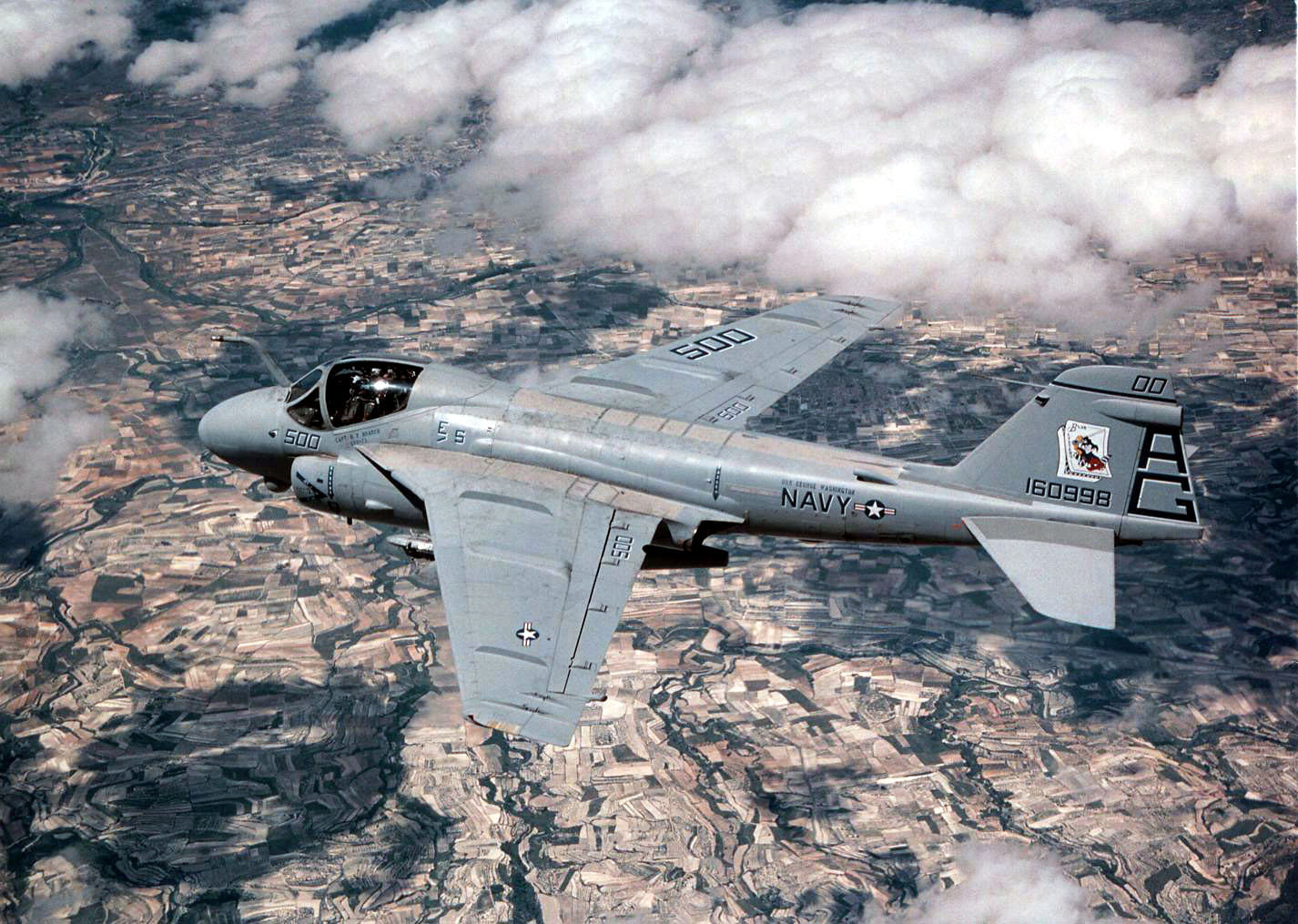
160998, a USN Grumman A-6 Intruder

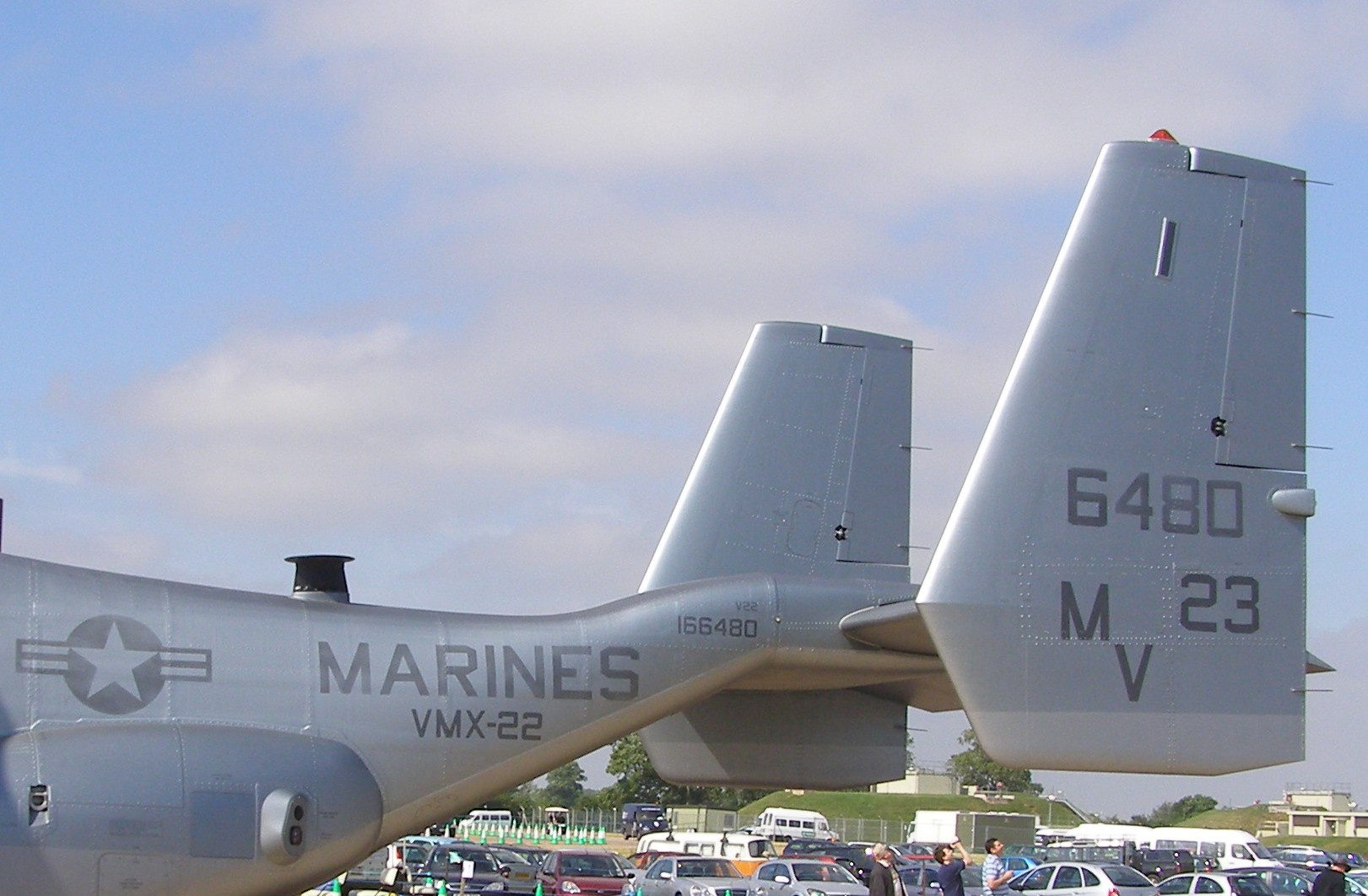
166480, a USMC MV-22 Osprey

In 1911, the United States Navy (USN) purchased its first aircraft, a Curtiss Triad pusher floatplane. The Navy allocated a prefix for each manufacturer, and the first aircraft was serialized A-1, with A allocated to Curtiss. Different letters were also allocated to the same manufacturer, but for different types of aircraft, for example, Curtiss amphibians were allocated E. In early 1914, the system was changed to a two-letter type/sub-type system, with each having a sequence starting from 1. A was allocated for heavier-than-air types, for example, AB was a flying boat and AX was an amphibian. All surviving aircraft from the original system were resealed.

In 1917, the individual number sequences were stopped, and a combined sequential numerical system was started at number 51. Prefix letters were retained for a short time, but in 1917 they were replaced with the single letter A for an aeroplane. The numbers were official designating numbers, but became known as Bureau Numbers (BuNos) due to their assignment by the Navy Bureau of Aeronautics. In 1930, the service ceased using the A prefix; the last such serial was A-9204.

In 1935, when the sequence reached 9999, the sequence was restarted at 0001. At the start of the 1940s, so many aircraft were purchased that surviving aircraft from the first sequence could be confused with second-series aircraft, and the sequence was stopped at 7303.

In 1940, the third sequence was started at 00001 (with five digits). When the third sequence reached 99999, it continued with six digits which continues to date.

=== United States Coast Guard ===
In 1926, the United States Coast Guard purchased its own aircraft, and they were assigned one or two-digit serial numbers. In 1934, the system was changed to a three-digit number with the first digit indicating an aircraft type. In 1936, this was changed again, and all aircraft (including those withdrawn from use) were allocated serials starting with V101. In 1945, the V prefix was removed and replaced with digit 1 to make four-digit serial numbers, which continues to the present. Since 1969, executive aircraft operated for the Secretary of the Treasury were assigned their own sequence beginning with 1.

== Presentation (Army/Air Force) ==
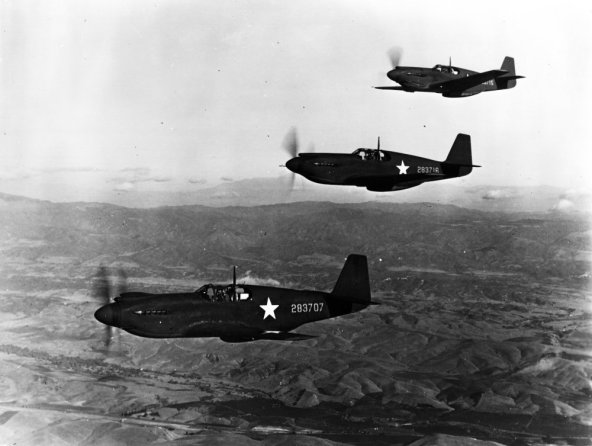
USAAF A-36 Apaches with fuselage-painted serial numbers

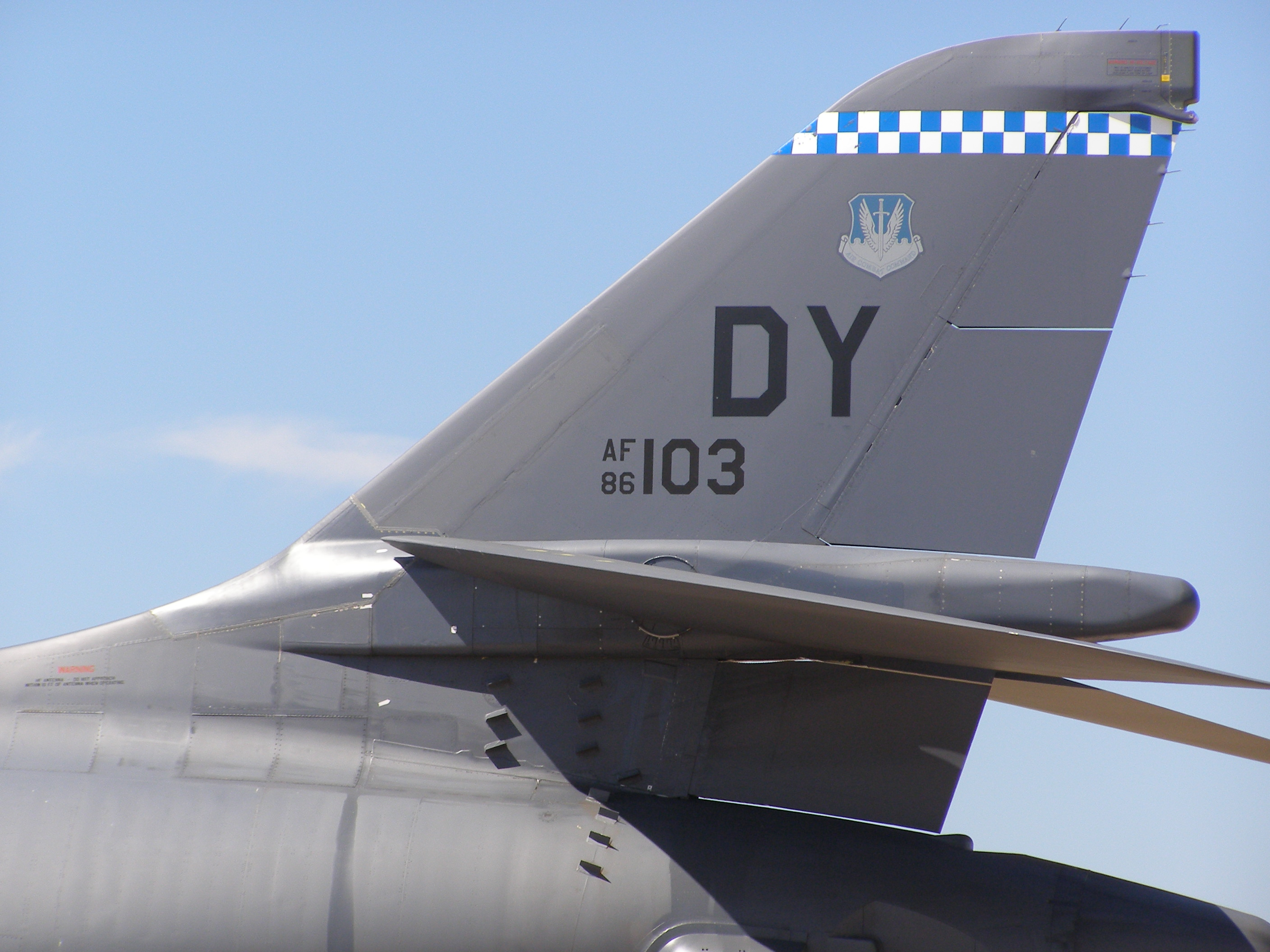
B-1B Lancer showing the USAF tactical style

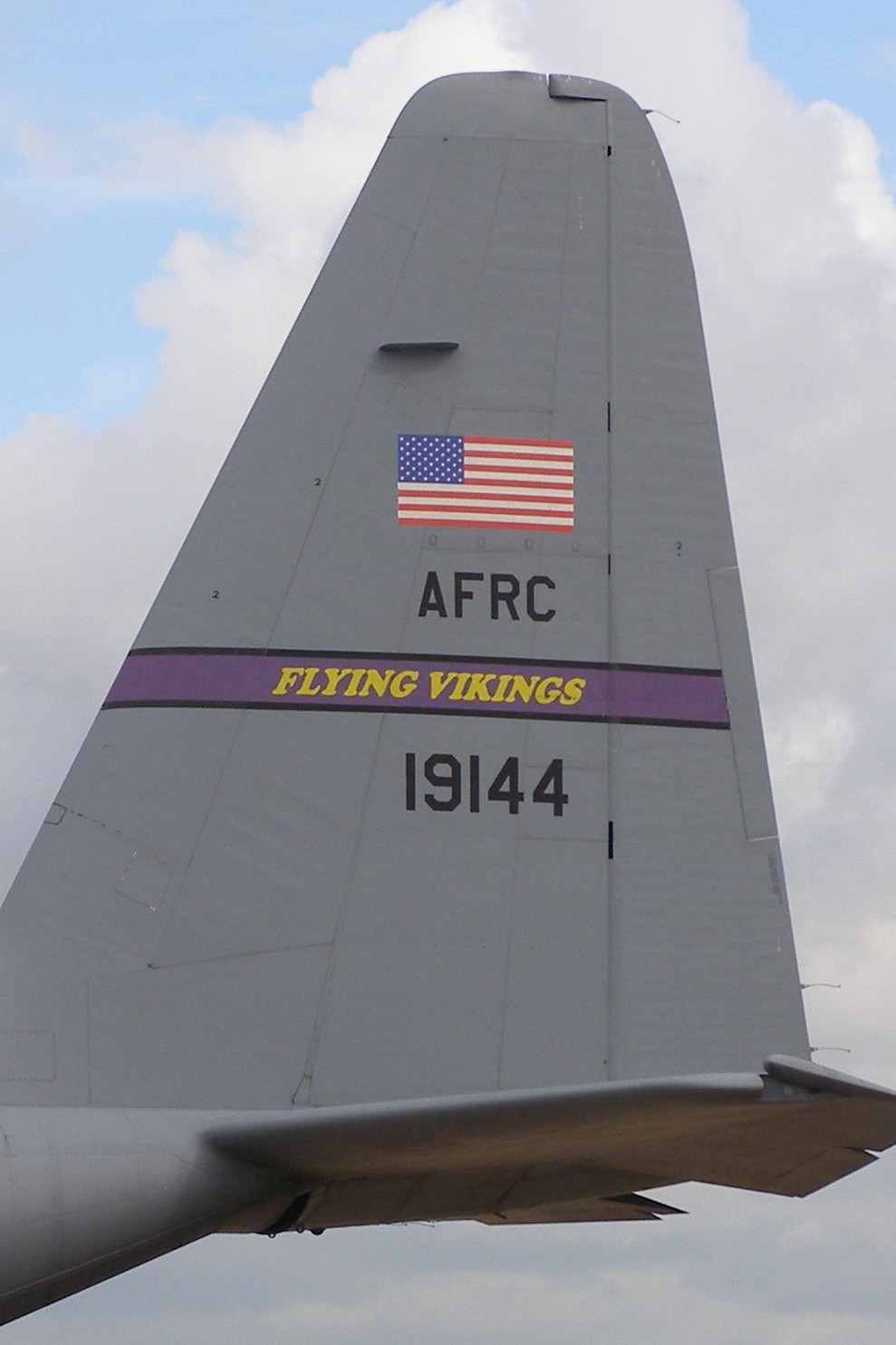
C-130H Hercules showing the USAF five-digit style

The early Army aircraft had large black serials marked on the fin or rudder, and in 1917 it was usual to prefix the serial with SC for signal corps, or later AS for aerial service. Later, the prefixes were not always marked and were eventually dropped. From 1942, the serial number was applied to the fin (or boom if a helicopter) — alternatively, the North American A-36 Apache usually had its serial showing on the fuselage instead — with the first digit of the fiscal year being omitted. The serial would not be allowed to be less than four digits (for example B-45 serial number 47-007 was marked 7007), but there was no upper limit (for example YP-59A 42-108783 was marked as 2108783).

When the original fiscal year of a serial became ten years earlier than the current fiscal year, the tail number was often prefixed with a zero, for example, 0-16717 instead of 16717 for UH-1H fiscal serial 66-16717. This was for disambiguation purposes, to avoid confusion with tail numbers for later fiscal years. The practice was generally abandoned in the 1980s. The notion that it was O for Obsolete is a widespread myth.

In 1956, the fin serials were changed from a minimum of four digits to five digits and in 1957 all serials were limited to five digits (for example KC-135R 58-0001 is marked as 80001). The system is still in use. An aircraft in the first 10 units purchased in the fiscal year is often referred to as "Balls-(number)" – for example, NASA's B-52B, the oldest B-52 in service until its retirement, was known as Balls 8. Aircraft that use the tactical style of marking (for example AF80 020 to the left and below the wing tail code) are also referred to as 'balls'. This is a combination of the two consecutive zeros, one from the last digit in the build year and the other from the first digit in the aircraft number.

In 1969, camouflaged tactical aircraft were marked with a modified presentation with the fiscal year followed by the last three digits of the serial number. Also, the letters AF were often added as a prefix or nearby. On the Northrop Grumman B-2 Spirit bomber, lacking a tail, the number appears on the upper fuselage and is repeated on the nose gear door.

Whatever the serial presentation on the fin, the full fiscal serial is always presented in a technical data block, which is normally on the port (left) side near the cockpit. Often a portion of the aircraft serial number is also painted on the aircraft nose (as is done with helicopters) or on the nose landing gear door (as is done on fighters and bombers) to help ground and aircrew personnel speedily identify a certain aircraft as it approaches while taxiing into or out of parking spots or elsewhere around an airfield.

== Presentation (Navy and Marine Corps) ==
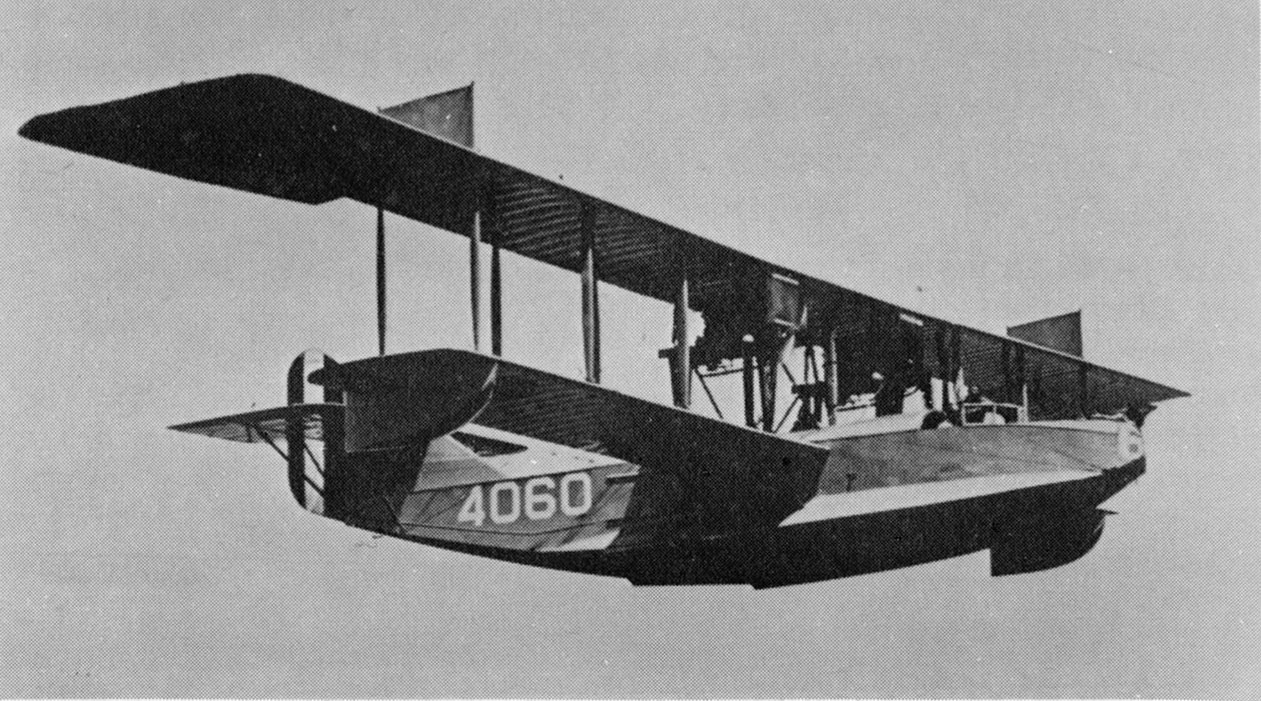
4060 a Curtiss Model H with early fuselage presentation used by the Navy

Each Navy and Marine Corps aircraft normally has its Bureau Number plus the type designation marked in small letters on the rear fuselage. Sometimes the last four digits of the serial are painted on the fuselage or vertical stabilizer fin. Sometimes the last three digits are used as the side codes also known as nose numbers or MODEXs (most commonly in the USN P-3C Orion and P-8A Poseidon fleet), but on most operational aircraft this is normally a squadron assigned code instead of a shortened serial number.

== See also ==
- Buzz number
- Tail code
- United Kingdom military aircraft registration number
- Swiss military aircraft serials

== Bibliography ==
- Andrade, John M. 1979. US Military Aircraft Designations and Serials since 1909. Midland Counties Publications ISBN 0-904597-22-9
- Danby, Peter, ed. (1977). United States Air Force Serials 1946 to 1977. Liverpool, England: Merseyside Aviation Society. ISBN 0-902420-18-6.
