= Stroukoff Aircraft =

Former American aircraft manufacturer

Stroukoff Aircraft Company
- Industry: Aircraft manufacture
- Founded: 1954
- Founder: Michael Stroukoff
- Defunct: 1959
- Fate: Dissolved
- Headquarters: Trenton, New Jersey, United States of America
- Products: YC-134

Stroukoff Aircraft was an American manufacturer of experimental military transport aircraft, established in 1954 by Michael Stroukoff. Successor to Chase Aircraft, the company specialised in developing advanced variants of the C-123 Provider; however, none of the company's designs attracted a production order, and the company folded in 1959.

== Founding ==
During the late 1940s, Ukrainian émigré Michael Stroukoff designed the XG-20 for Chase Aircraft, the largest glider ever built in the United States. Modified into the C-123 Provider, the aircraft had won a contract for production from the United States Air Force, 49% of Chase being acquired by Kaiser-Frazier to produce the aircraft at the latter company's Willow Run facility. However, a scandal involving Kaiser resulted in the C-123 contract being cancelled; with Kaiser having bought out the remainder of Chase and dissolving the company, Stroukoff acquired the company's facilities at the Trenton airport, and established his own company to continue development of the C-123 design.

== YC-123D and E ==
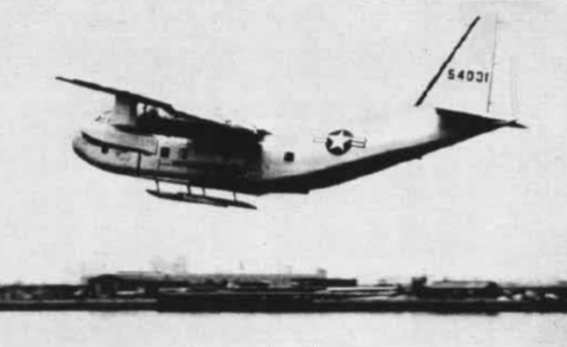
YC-123E with pantobase landing gear 1955

Stroukoff's first advanced variant of the C-123 design was the YC-123D, modified from the XC-123A prototype - itself a modified XCG-20 - which had been the first jet transport to fly in the United States. Flying in 1954, the YC-123D was fitted with the twin piston engines of the normal C-123 family, and was equipped with a boundary layer control (BLC) system. The BLC diverted air from the engines to blow over the wing, increasing lift and reducing the aircraft's takeoff and landing distances.

The following year, Stroukoff modified a C-123B into the YC-123E, fitted with Stroukoff's own Pantobase landing gear system. The Pantobase system allowed the aircraft to land on any reasonably flat surface - land, water, or snow - and proved remarkably successful in testing.

== YC-134 ==
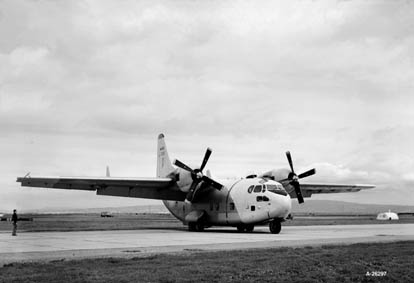
Stroukoff Aircraft YC-134A

Following its successful trials, the YC-123E was further developed into the YC-134. Designated MS-8-1 by the company, the YC-134 featured both boundary layer control and the Pantobase landing gear; in addition, the aircraft was fitted with more powerful engines, tailplane endplates, additional wheels for the main landing gear, and an improved fuel system.

Intended for Arctic use, the YC-134's test flight program proved successful. However, its increase in performance over that of the C-123 was considered inadequate; in addition, there was simply no need for an additional piston-engined transport by that time, and the proposed production contract was cancelled. With the failure to gain any contracts for production of its designs, Stroukoff dissolved the company in 1959. (Note: Stroukoff Aircraft was invited to tender a design for the U.S. Navy's patrol aircraft requirement that produced the Convair XP6Y, but declined to do so, presumably choosing to concentrate on its Avitruc designs.)
