= Chase YC-122 Avitruc =

1940s military transport aircraft

XG-18/YC-122 Avitruc
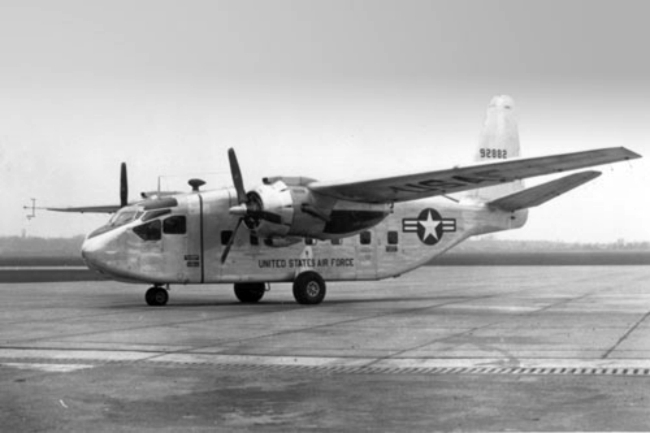
- YC-122C

General information
- Type: Military transport aircraft
- Manufacturer: Chase
- Designer: Michael Stroukoff
- Number built: 18

History
- Manufactured: 1947–1953
- First flight: 18 December 1947
- Developed from: Chase CG-14
- Developed into: Hiller X-18

The Chase XCG-18A and YC-122 Avitruc (known internally as the Chase MS.7) was a military transport aircraft designed by Chase Aircraft and produced in limited numbers in the United States in the late 1940s, initially as a glider, but definitively in powered form. The design was based on the CG-14 cargo glider but was substantially larger and featured all-metal construction. It was a high-wing cantilever monoplane. The fuselage was of rectangular cross-section and featured a loading ramp at its rear. The main undercarriage units were carried at the sides of the fuselage and were fixed, while the nosewheel was retractable. In its powered form, two radial engines were fitted in nacelles in the wings.

== Design and development ==
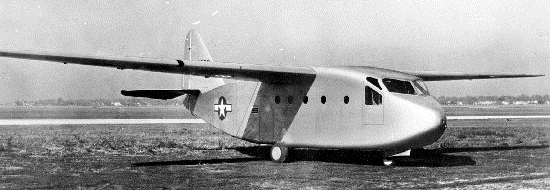
The XCG-18A

The USAAF's experiences with cargo gliders during World War II indicated a role for a similar aircraft in the post-war inventory, but one capable of carrying a substantially heavier load and with greater recoverability than the essentially expendable wartime wooden assault gliders. Chase's CG-14 was selected as a starting point, and in January 1947, the USAAF placed an order for an enlarged, metal version of this aircraft, initially designated XCG-14B but redesignated to XCG-18A to reflect the basically all-new nature of the aircraft. When the prototype flew that December, it was the world's first all-metal transport glider. One of the major improvements was the use of a thinner wing section which allowed high tow speeds and small aircraft like the P-47 fighter being able to tow it into the air and to its release point.

== Operational history ==
In March 1948, the service (now the USAF) ordered four more aircraft under the new designation XG-18A and a fifth to be fitted with engines as the YC-122. The air force eventually lost interest in purchasing assault gliders, but continued with the development of the powered variant, purchasing two more examples for evaluation as the YC-122A and redesignating the second of these as the YC-122B when the original Pratt & Whitney engines were swapped for Wright units. This aircraft would form the basis for the definitive service trials version, the YC-122C.

Nine of these aircraft were ordered and although they performed well in evaluation (first at Sewart AFB, Tennessee, later at Ardmore AFB, Oklahoma), the USAF no longer saw a need for a small transport aircraft and cancelled the project. Despite the short-lived history of the aircraft, it was used extensively at Ardmore AFB. By February 1955, at least one pilot, Captain Phillip C. Gromley of the 16th Troop Carrier Squadron, 463rd Troop Carrier Wing, achieved 1,000 hours in piloting the aircraft. All aircraft were replaced by Fairchild C-123B Providers by July 1955. The last YC-122C assault transport was flown to Tucson, Arizona, on 30 August 1955, for storage at Davis-Monthan AFB. Captain Gromely is recorded as making the final flight of a YC-122C to Tucson. The remaining machines served on in utility roles until 1957.

Following their retirement, the fuselage of one of the YC-122s was used in the construction of the Hiller X-18.

== Variants ==
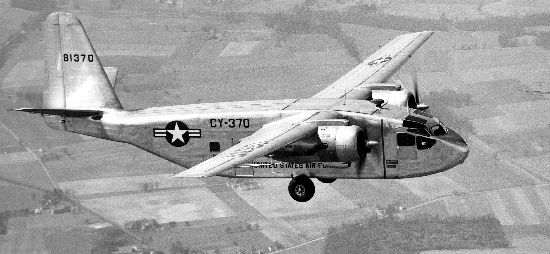
A YC-122 in flight

Chase MS.7
Company designation for the XCG-14B / XCG-18A
XCG-18A
XCG-14B re-designated
XG-18A
revised glider version (4 built)
YC-122
prototype powered version, an XG-18A with Pratt & Whitney R-2000-11 engines (one built)
YC-122A
refined version of the YC-122 (two built)
YC-122B
YC-122A re-engined with Wright R-1820-101 engines (one converted)
YC-122C
definitive service trials version (nine built)

== Operators ==
United States

- United States Air Force
  - 16th Troop Carrier Squadron (Assault)
  - 316th Troop Carrier Group

== Specifications (YC-122C) ==
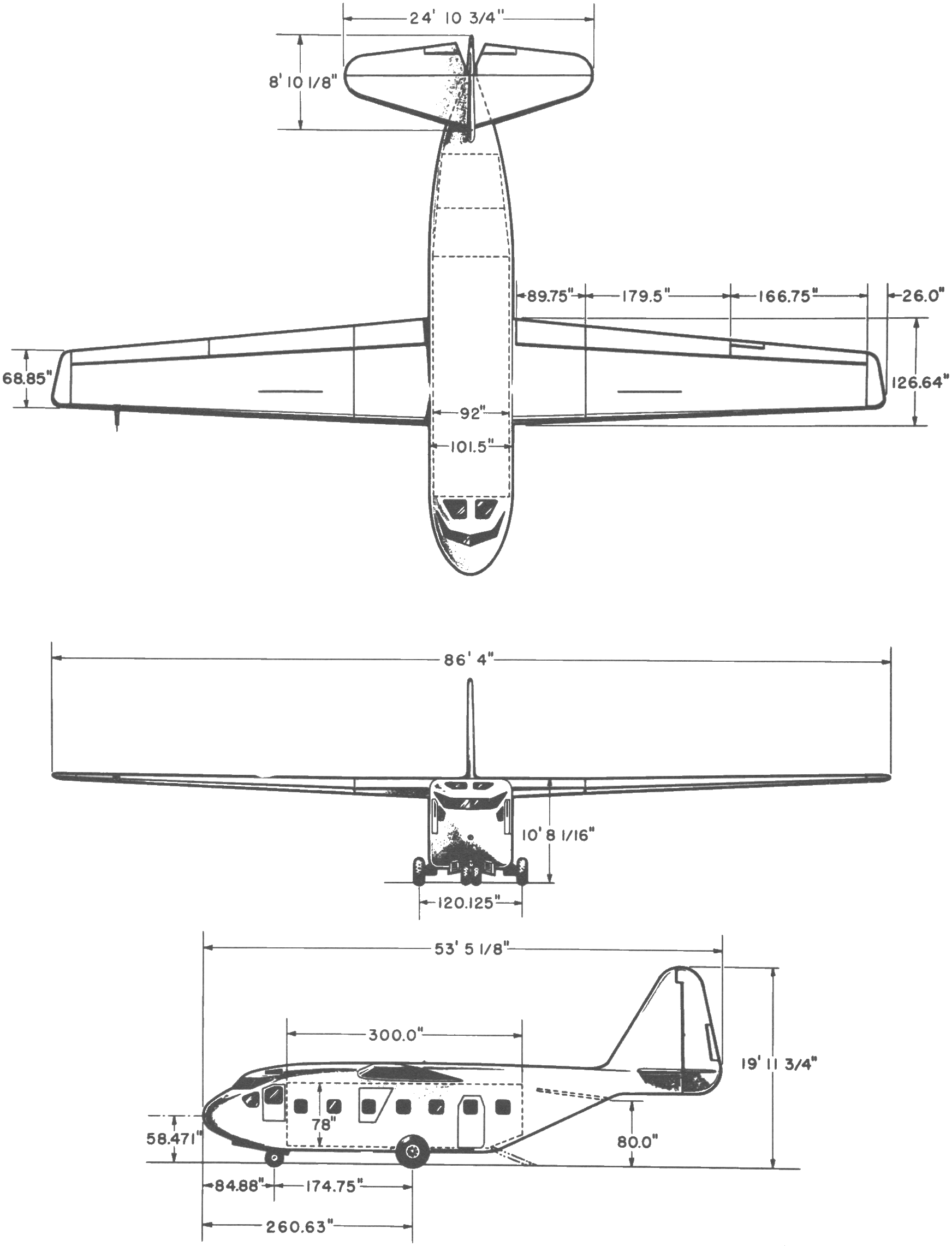
3-view line drawing of the Chase YG-18A

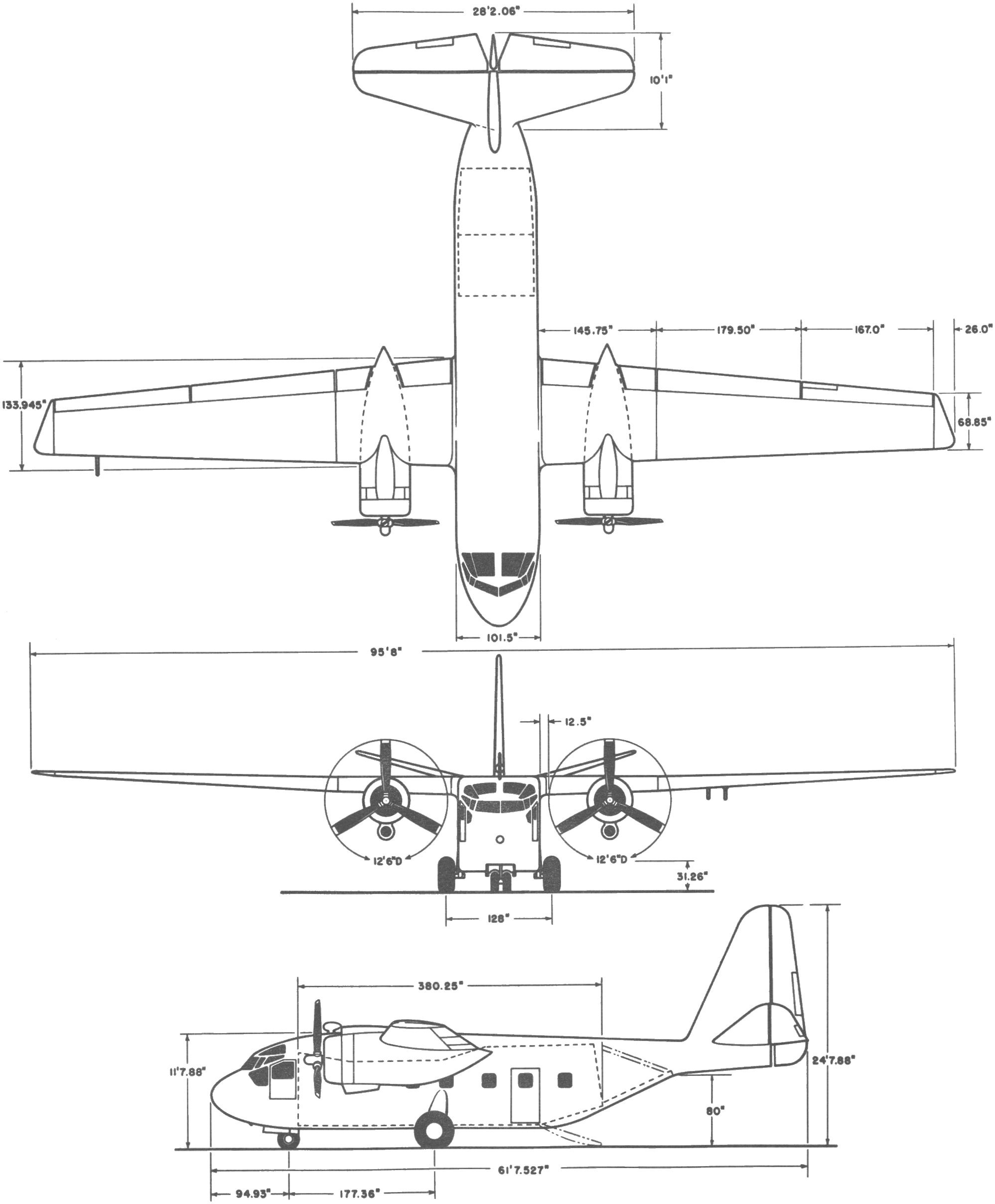
3-view line drawing of the Chase YC-122B

Data from Jane's All The World's Aircraft 1951–52 & American Military Transport Aircraft Since 1925

General characteristics

- Crew: Two pilots
- Capacity: 30 troops or 24 stretchers or 7,500 lb (3.4 t) cargo
- Length: 61 ft 8 in (18.80 m)
- Wingspan: 95 ft 8 in (29.16 m)
- Height: 24 ft 8 in (7.52 m)
- Wing area: 812.8 sq ft (75.51 m^{2})
- Aspect ratio: 11.25:1
- Empty weight: 19,000 lb (8,618 kg)
- Max takeoff weight: 40,000 lb (18,144 kg)
- Powerplant: 2 × Wright R-1820-101 9-cylinder air-cooled radial piston engine, 1,425 hp (1,063 kW) each

Performance

- Maximum speed: 240 mph (390 km/h, 210 kn)
- Cruise speed: 200 mph (320 km/h, 170 kn)
- Stall speed: 75 mph (121 km/h, 65 kn)
- Range: 1,000 mi (1,600 km, 870 nmi) with maximum cargo
- Service ceiling: 29,100 ft (8,900 m)
- Rate of climb: 1,340 ft/min (6.8 m/s)

== See also ==
Related development

- Chase YCG-14 – 1940s American assault glider prototype
- Hiller X-18 – Experimental cargo transport aircraft

Aircraft of comparable role, configuration, and era

- Chase XCG-20 – Transport glider, U.S. Air Force, 1950
- Fairchild C-123 Provider – Military transport aircraft series by Chase Aircraft, later Fairchild Aircraft

Related lists

- List of military aircraft of the United States
