= Douglas XCG-17 =

Prototype for a sailing military aircraft, based on the Douglas DC-3

XCG-17
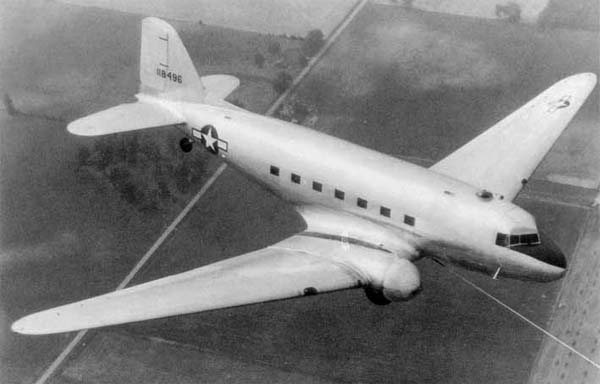
- The XCG-17 during towed flight

General information
- Type: Assault glider
- National origin: United States
- Manufacturer: Douglas Aircraft
- Primary user: United States Army Air Forces
- Number built: 1
- Construction number: 4588
- Registration: N69030; XA-JID; XC-0PS
- Serial: 41-18496

History
- First flight: June 14, 1944
- Developed from: Douglas C-47 Skytrain

The Douglas XCG-17 was an American assault glider, developed by the conversion of a C-47 Skytrain twin-engine transport during World War II. Although the XCG-17 was successfully tested, the requirement for such a large glider had passed, and no further examples of the type were built; one additional C-47, however, was converted in the field to glider configuration briefly during 1946 for evaluation, but was quickly reconverted to powered configuration.

== Design and development ==
With the introduction of the Douglas C-54 Skymaster four-engined transport aircraft, the United States Army Air Forces, observing that conventional gliders then in service (Note: The Waco CG-4 was the glider most commonly used by the USAAF during World War II.) would be an inefficient use of the C-54's power and capacity, determined that a requirement existed for a new, much larger assault glider. It was determined that the best solution to the requirement was the conversion of the Douglas C-47 Skytrain, already in large-scale production, to meet the requirement. The C-47 could be converted to a glider configuration with minimal alteration to the airframe, and would provide the required capacity.

Trials conducted using a conventional, powered C-47, first conducting ordinary deadstick landings, then being towed by another C-47, indicated that the scheme was feasible. Therefore, a C-47-DL was taken in hand for conversion into a glider, which was given the designation XCG-17. (Note: In the U.S. Army Air Forces' designation scheme, the "-DL" suffix indicated an aircraft built at Douglas' Long Beach, California factory.) The aircraft, formerly a Northwest Airlines DC-3 that had been impressed into military service at the start of World War II, (Note: A variety of DC-3 series aircraft were impressed into military service at the start of the war. While DC-3 series aircraft constructed for the military were given the designation C-47, impressed aircraft received a variety of designations, including C-47, C-48, C-49, C-50, and C-53, among others. Confusing things further is that the C-53 designation was also assigned to purpose-built military DC-3s, named Skytrooper, that were intended exclusively for personnel transport.) was modified by the removal of the aircraft's engines; the nacelles, containing the landing gear, remained in place, covered with aerodynamically profiled hemispherical domes for streamlining, containing fixed weight to compensate for the removal of the engines. Other equipment, no longer necessary with the conversion to an unpowered configuration, was also removed to save weight; items removed included the aircraft's wiring and bulkheads, along with the navigator's and radio operator's positions.

== Operational history ==
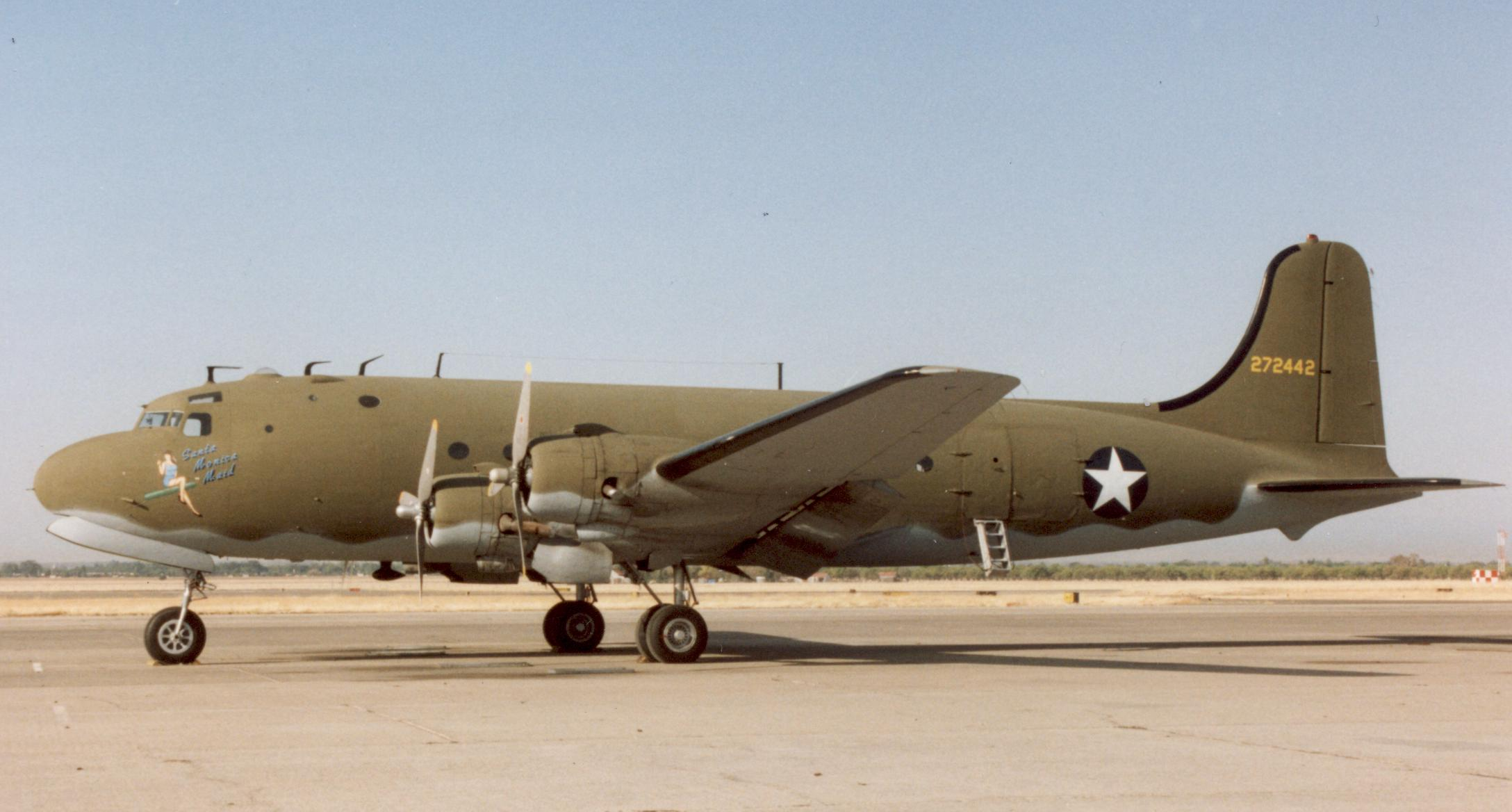
The C-54 was the preferred tow aircraft for the XCG-17

The conversion, carried out at Clinton County Army Air Field, was completed on June 12, 1944, with the aircraft undergoing its initial flight test shortly thereafter. The flight testing of the XCG-17 proved that the aircraft was satisfactory; compared with conventional gliders in service, the aircraft possessed lower stalling and higher towing speeds than conventional gliders, as well as gliding at a significantly shallower angle. Tow tests were conducted using a variety of aircraft; the most commonly used configuration was a tandem tow by two C-47s, with the towing aircraft coupled one in front of the other and the leading aircraft detaching following takeoff. This configuration was dangerous for the "middle" C-47, however, and it was determined that a single C-54 was the optimal tug aircraft.

The XCG-17's cargo hold had a capacity of 15,000 pounds (6,800 kg); alternatively, up to 40 fully equipped troops could be transported, these figures being significantly larger than conventional gliders' capacity. The XCG-17 was also capable of carrying three jeeps in a single load, or alternatively two 105-millimetre (4.1 in) howitzers. Regardless of the aircraft's load, no ballast was required to maintain the aircraft's center of gravity, a trait unique among American assault gliders.

Despite the satisfactory results in testing, however, the aircraft failed the Army's requirement that it be capable of landing on unimproved fields; in addition, by the time the XCG-17's evaluation was completed the need for such a large assault glider had passed. The primary role for the glider had been intended to increase the amount of supplies that could be carried to China over "The Hump"; the war situation had, however, become more favorable and the added capacity an oversized glider would provide was no longer necessary. No further examples of the type were produced; the prototype, its trials complete, was placed in storage, being ferried to Davis-Monthan Air Force Base for disposal in August 1946.

In August 1949, the aircraft was sold to Advance Industries, its engines being reinstalled to return the aircraft to powered status in DC-3C configuration. Some sources, however, indicate that the XCG-17 was reconverted to C-47 configuration in 1946. Following its restoration to powered status, the aircraft was transferred to Mexico, where it remained in civilian service until 1980.

=== Field conversion ===
"Nez Perce"
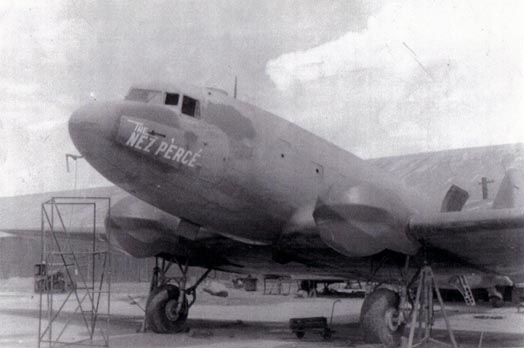
- "Nez Perce" after conversion to glider configuration

General information
- Other name: XCG-47; XCG-17
- Type: Field-converted glider
- Serial: 43-16229

History
- Manufactured: 1946
- First flight: June 17, 1946 (as glider)
- Fate: Reconverted to C-47

Although the XCG-17 failed to lead to any production of a C-47 derived glider type, a single C-47 was converted in the field to glider configuration by the Fifth Air Service Area Command, located at Nichols Field on Luzon in the Philippines, during January 1946. Carried out in much the same manner as the XCG-17, the conversion included octagonally shaped fairings over the engine mountings, with an auxiliary power unit from a B-24 Liberator bomber being installed.

Referred to as "XCG-47" as well as "XCG-17", and named "Nez Perce", the aircraft undertook its initial flight following conversion on June 17, 1946, towed by a C-54. The flight tests of the field-converted aircraft proved favorable, and an ambitious flight, towing the aircraft from Luzon to Tokyo in Japan, was planned. This flight was intended to prove the suitability of large gliders to act as an "aerial freight train" for regular transport.

The flight, conducted in late June 1946, took 11 hours of flight time and included an overnight stay on Okinawa; covering 1,800 miles (2,900 km), it concluded at Tachikawa Airfield near Tokyo. Despite the success of the flight, the "aerial freight train" concept did not catch on; the aircraft had its engines re-fitted in August 1946 and was returned to service as a normal C-47.

== Operators ==
=== Military (as C-47, then XCG-17) ===
United States

- United States Army Air Forces

=== Civilian (as DC-3C) ===
Mexico

- Petroleos Mexicanos

== Specifications (41-18496) ==
Data from

General characteristics

- Crew: Two (Pilot and copilot)
- Capacity: 15,000 pounds (6,800 kg) cargo or 40 troops
- Length: 63 ft 9 in (19.43 m)
- Wingspan: 95 ft 6 in (29.11 m)
- Height: 17 ft (5.2 m)
- Wing area: 987 sq ft (91.7 m^{2})
- Empty weight: 11,001 lb (4,990 kg)
- Gross weight: 26,000 lb (11,793 kg)

Performance

- Maximum speed: 290 mph (470 km/h, 250 kn) max towing speed
- Cruise speed: 190 mph (305 km/h, 165 kn) gliding speed
- Stall speed: 35 mph (56 km/h, 30 kn)
- Maximum glide ratio: 14:1
- Wing loading: 26.3 lb/sq ft (128 kg/m^{2})

== See also ==
Related development

- Douglas DC-3
- Douglas C-47 Skytrain
- Douglas AC-47 Spooky
- Douglas C-53 Skytrooper
- Lisunov Li-2
- Showa L2D

Aircraft of comparable role, configuration, and era

- Chase XCG-20
- General Aircraft Hamilcar
- Ilyushin Il-32
- Messerschmitt Me 321

Related lists

- List of military aircraft of the United States
