= Chase YCG-14 =

1940s American assault glider prototype

YCG-14
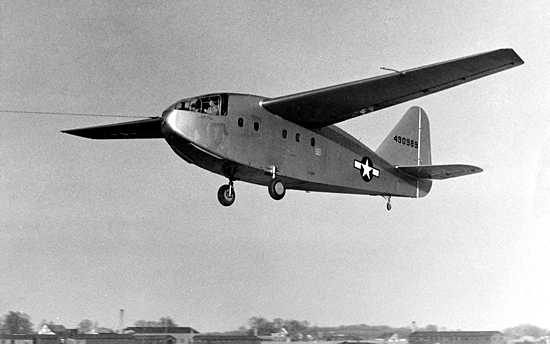

General information
- Type: Assault glider
- Manufacturer: Chase Aircraft
- Designer: Michael Stroukoff
- Primary user: United States Air Force

History
- Manufactured: 3
- First flight: January 4, 1945
- Developed into: Chase CG-18

The Chase CG-14, also known as the G-14 or Model MS.1, was an assault glider manufactured by Chase Aircraft for the United States Army Air Forces during the Second World War. The aircraft failed to progress beyond the prototype stage, being overtaken by larger, improved glider designs.

== Design and development ==
The first aircraft to be developed by Chase after its founding in 1943, the CG-14 was developed in preference to the Laister-Kauffman CG-10. Constructed from marine-grade mahogany, as spruce was being used by the war effort in higher priority projects, the XG-14 featured improved crash protection when compared to preceding gliders.

== Operational history ==
The XCG-14 made its maiden flight on January 4, 1945, and following successful flight trials the aircraft was developed into two improved versions, the wood-and-metal XCG-14A and the enlarged YCG-14A.

The CG-14 was one of the few glider projects to be continued after the end of the war; however, it was quickly superseded by an improved aircraft, the XCG-18.

== Variants ==
Chase MS.1
Company designation for the XCG-14
XCG-14
First prototype, all-wooden. 16 seats.
XCG-14A
Wood and metal version of XCG-14. 24 seats.
YCG-14A/YG-14A
Production prototype version of XCG-14A, superseded by XCG-14B.
Chase MS.7
Company designation for the XCG-14B
XCG-14B/XG-14B
Enlarged, improved variant, redesignated XCG-18, 2 built.

== Specifications (XCG-14) ==
Data from Fighting Gliders of World War II

General characteristics

- Crew: 2
- Capacity:
  - One 1-ton 4 x 4 truck + 3 soldiers or
  - One M3A1 75 mm howitzer + crew or
  - 18 troops fully equipped
- Length: 42 ft 10.5 in (13.069 m)
- Wingspan: 71 ft 9.6 in (21.885 m)
- Height: 6 ft 9.6 in (2.073 m)
- Wing area: 507 sq ft (47.1 m^{2})
- Aspect ratio: 10.18
- Airfoil: NACA 23016
- Empty weight: 3,237 lb (1,468 kg)
- Max takeoff weight: 7,605 lb (3,450 kg)

Performance

- Maximum speed: 170 mph (270 km/h, 150 kn) Maximum Aero-tow speed
- Stall speed: 60 mph (97 km/h, 52 kn) flaps down
- Never exceed speed: 200 mph (320 km/h, 170 kn)

== See also ==
Related lists

- List of military aircraft of the United States
