= Stroukoff YC-134 =

1956 prototype airlifter model

YC-134
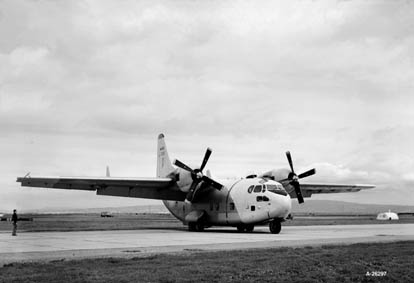

General information
- Type: Military transport aircraft
- Manufacturer: Stroukoff Aircraft
- Designer: Michael Stroukoff
- Primary user: United States Air Force
- Number built: 1

History
- Developed from: Fairchild C-123 Provider

The Stroukoff YC-134, designed in 1956, was based heavily on the Fairchild C-123 Provider, itself designed by Michael Stroukoff. The United States military contracted with Stroukoff Aircraft Corporation to develop an improved version of the aircraft, combining features that the company had developed for the YC-123D and YC-123E.

== History ==
=== Stroukoff's work with the C-123 ===
In 1956, Stroukoff had already gained much experience working on the C-123 Provider, having completed two contracts based on that airframe.

Its YC-123D had introduced a Boundary Layer Control (BLC) system to the C-123B. This system forced pressurized air over the upper wing surfaces of the airplane, making the wing work as if it were flying at much greater airspeed. This greatly improved landing and take-off performance, gross weight capability, and lowered the C-123's stall speed.

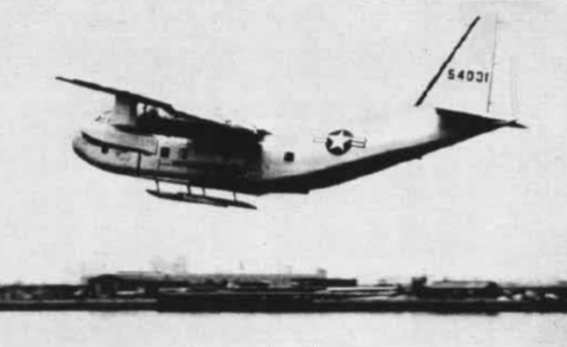
YC-123E with pantobase landing gear

The YC-123E had been another experiment in improving the C-123's ability to operate wherever it might need to, introducing Stroukoff's own Pantobase system: two high-stress skis fitted to the lower fuselage, wingtip mounted floats, along with sealing the fuselage itself. This gave the YC-123E the ability to operate on water, as well as ice and snow, and with the BLC from the previous YC-123D, the new aircraft could effectively be operated from almost any runway surface available, and airstrips of shorter length.

=== The YC-134 ===
The product of a US Air Force contract in 1956, a single C-123B from the -CN production block (serial 52-1627) was modified by Stroukoff Aircraft to become the YC-134. This aircraft was heavily modified with the following new features:

- New Engines: The YC-134 was equipped with two 3,500 hp (2,600 kW) Wright Turbo Compound R3350-89A radial engines, turning four-blade, thirteen foot Aeroproducts constant-speed fully feathering propellers.
- Improved Control Surfaces: The YC-134's horizontal stabilizers were given endplates to improve directional stability. This gave the aircraft its distinctive three-tail look.
- Improved landing gear: While the nosewheel from the C-123B was retained, both main gears were given a third wheel to improve weight distribution.
- Fuel was no longer housed in the rear of the engine nacelles, but in an expanded center-wing fuel tank. In addition, two plumbed hardpoints for 550-gallon drop tanks were also added to each wing.
- Stroukoff's BLC and Pantobase: the YC-134 was fitted with Stroukoff's own BLC and all three aircraft had they been delivered were to have been fitted with the Pantobase equipment designed for the YC-123E.

These features gave an empty weight increase over the C-123B from 31,058 lb (14,088 kg) to 37,965 lb (17,221 kg), and a maximum loaded weight increase from 60,000 lb (27,000 kg) to 74,700 lb (33,900 kg). The aircraft's cruising speed was 219 mph (352 km/h), compared to the C-123B's 190 mph (310 km/h), and the YC-134 had a 1,600-mile (2,600 km) range with a 24,000 lb (11,000 kg) payload. The BLC allowed the YC-134's take-off distance to decrease from 1,850 feet (560 m) to 750 feet (230 m), very similar to that of the YC-123D. The U.S. Air Force, however, deemed that the YC-134 did not offer substantial improvement over the C-123, nor did it have a requirement for a piston-engined amphibious assault transport, and decided to purchase the Lockheed C-130 Hercules.

== Specifications (YC-134A) ==
Data from Jane's All the World's Aircraft 1958–59

General characteristics

- Length: 82 ft 0 3/4 in (25.013 m)
- Wingspan: 110 ft 0 in (33.53 m)
- Height: 34 ft 8 1/2 in (10.579 m)
- Wing area: 1,234.9 sq ft (114.73 m^{2})
- Aspect ratio: 9.8:1
- Airfoil: MS8-016.64
- Empty weight: 40,391 lb (18,321 kg) (equipped)
- Gross weight: 74,700 lb (33,883 kg)
- Fuel capacity: 1,032 US gal (859 imp gal; 3,910 L) internal fuel + 1,000 US gal (830 imp gal; 3,800 L) in underwing float tanks
- Powerplant: 2 × Wright R-3350-89A Turbo Compound 18-cylinder 2-row air-cooled radial engines, 3,500 hp (2,600 kW) each
- Propellers: 4-bladed Aeroproducts Model A644FN-C2 fully-feathering constant-speed propellers

Performance

- Cruise speed: 250 mph (400 km/h, 220 kn) at 10,000 ft (3,000 m)
- Range: 1,610 mi (2,590 km, 1,400 nmi) with 24,000 lb (11,000 kg) payload
- Takeoff distance on land: 740 ft (230 m)
- Takeoff distance on water: 1,250 ft (380 m)
- Landing distance on land: 550 ft (170 m)
- Landing distance on water: 750 ft (230 m)

== See also ==
Related development

- Chase XCG-20
- Fairchild C-123 Provider

Related lists

- List of military aircraft of the United States
