= Michael Stroukoff =

American architect

- Born: 29 January 1883; Dnipro, Russian Empire
- Died: 22 December 1973 (aged 90); Trenton, New Jersey
- Spouse(s): Larissa Stroukoff, Lorraine Wolff Stroukoff
- Engineering career
- Significant design: Fairchild C-123 Provider

Michael Stroukoff (29 January 1883 - 22 December 1973) was a Russian White Guard soldier and an American architect and aircraft designer. He served in the White Army during the Russian Revolution before emigrating to the United States in 1922. After spending some time as an architect, he joined the Chase Aircraft Company and designed a number of transport aircraft for the United States Army Air Forces and the United States Air Force, later starting his own company to perform further aeronautical work.

== Early life ==
Born 29 January 1883 in Yekaterinoslav (Dnipro), a city in the Russian Empire, now part of Ukraine. Stroukoff attended the Kiev Polytechnic Institute, graduating in 1908 with a degree in civic engineering. Joining the Russian Army, he saw service during World War I.

After the war he served in the White Army during the Russian Revolution, attaining the rank of Major and being awarded the Order of St. George of the Fourth Degree. With the defeat of the Whites by the Bolsheviks, he fled Russia and emigrated to the United States in 1922.

== American career ==
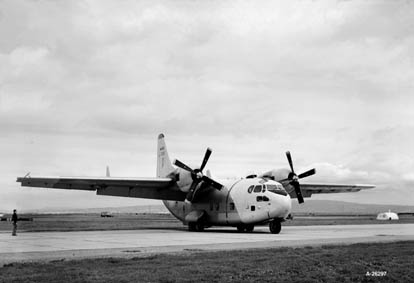
A Stroukoff Aircraft YC-134A

Following his emigration, Stroukoff started a career in architecture and interior design, before being appointed chief engineer and president of Chase Aircraft upon its foundation. His first design was the XCG-14, a wooden troop-carrying assault glider, which was developed into the larger CG-18 and CG-20 gliders, the latter being the largest glider ever constructed in the United States.

Following World War II, the assault glider fell out of favour, replaced by powered transports. Stroukoff modified a YG-18 into the prototype YC-122, and a small number of the aircraft were built. More important was the conversion of the G-20 into the C-123, described as a "Winged Truck" by Stroukoff. One version of the aircraft was the first jet-powered transport built in America.

The piston-engined 'assault transport' version of the C-123 won a contract from the United States Air Force for production. Due to limited capacity at Chase, this was subcontracted to the Kaiser Manufacturing Company, which purchased a 49% interest in Chase Aircraft. Following a procurement scandal and political issues, the C-123 contract was awarded to Fairchild Aircraft, and Kaiser bought out Chase Aircraft.

Setting up a new company, the Stroukoff Aircraft Corporation, Stroukoff continued work on improved versions of the C-123, most notably the YC-134. None of them went into production, and in 1959 the company closed down.

== Death and legacy ==
Stroukoff died at the age of 90 in St. Francis Hospital in Trenton, New Jersey on December 22, 1973.

The Larissa Stroukoff Memorial Trophy, awarded by the Soaring Society of America for the highest speed recorded on a closed course in a glider during the U.S. National Open Class Soaring Championships, was designed by Stroukoff.
