= Exercise Swarmer =

Exercise Swarmer (Operation Swarmer)
- Location: Southeastern United States; 35.14°N 78.99°W
- Objective: Training exercise
- Date: April 24-May 8, 1950 (UTC-5)
- Location within the United States

Exercise SWARMER (also known as Operation SWARMER) was a large-scale military exercise conducted in the spring of 1950 by the United States Air Force, United States Army, and United States Navy in the area of Fort Bragg, North Carolina in the southeastern United States. SWARMER was designed to test the capability of the Air Force and Army to operate and maintain an airhead, a base secured in enemy territory where troops and supplies could be received and evacuated by air, under simulated combat conditions. This was also the first tactical use of the strategic airlift technique, intending to apply lessons learned during the Berlin Airlift to battlefield logistics.

Starting on 24 April 1950 and running through 8 May 1950, the exercise took place over ten days and involved over 60,000 personnel.

== Scenario ==
In the hypothetical situation set forth to provide background for the play of the maneuver, the United States was at war with an Aggressor, whose forces had seized the Florida peninsula early in February. On 10 March, the Aggressor occupied Wilmington, North Carolina, while at the same time enemy airborne forces seized the Fort Bragg – Camp Mackall – Fayetteville, North Carolina area farther inland. To counter these moves, the Southeastern Theater of Operations (SET) was established and assigned the primary task of containing the Aggressor in the Florida peninsula, with the ultimate objective being the expulsion of the enemy from American soil. Following the Aggressor penetration of North Carolina, SET activated Task Force (TF) SWARMER to mount an airborne operation to free the Fort Bragg – Camp Mackall – Fayetteville area and destroy the Aggressor force in the Wilmington area. To accomplish these objectives, the plan was to first seize the Fort Bragg – Camp Mackall – Fayetteville area, which would provide airfields for a further buildup of friendly forces. Camp Mackall, located southwest of Fort Bragg, was chosen as the point of the initial attack. D-day was set for 28 April.

The airhead, as conceived in SWARMER, presupposed two conditions: that the airhead was established in an area where enemy air and ground forces possessed the capability of seriously interfering with the operation, and that the airhead was entirely supported by air. This support was to be provided by strategic airlift; i.e., by the continuous or sustained mass movement by air of personnel, equipment, and supplies into the airhead.

== Exercise ==
Exercise SWARMER involved the airdrop and landing of five 1,700-man regimental combat teams and their equipment from the 82nd Airborne Division at Fort Bragg and the 11th Airborne Division at Fort Campbell, Kentucky, including the aerial resupply of these forces.

The first airdrop was made on the morning of 28 April adjacent to Mackall Army Airfield (AAF) when the 11th Airborne Division's 187th RCT jumped from C-82s and C-119s . By early afternoon, the airfield had been secured and the airhead perimeter extended sufficiently to allow C-74s and C-54s, flying the strategic landing mission, to land the 11th Airborne Division's 511th RCT, which was airlifted from Fort Campbell. Later in the afternoon, the 82nd Airborne Division's 505th RCT parachuted into the northwestern corner of the Fort Bragg Military Reservation and advanced southwest to assist the 11th Airborne Division in securing the roads leading into the reservation. The 82nd Airborne Division's 504th RCT was landed at Mackall AAF by early evening and quickly crossed into the reservation. The following morning, on D plus 1, contact was made between the 505th RCT and elements of the 11th Airborne Division, and by late afternoon all entrances to the western part of the reservation and road junctions in the immediate vicinity had been secured. Early on D plus 2, the 82nd Airborne Division's 325th RCT was airdropped in the center of the reservation, behind the Aggressor's lines, forcing him to withdraw, and by afternoon, the 82nd Airborne Division, attacking eastward, had secured Pope Air Force Base, adjacent to Fort Bragg itself. The next two days were spent consolidating positions and preparing for an attack to the southeast to seize the final objective, Fayetteville Airfield. Early on the morning of D plus 5, the two airborne divisions jumped off, and by 10:00 reached the eastern limits of the reservation, at which point the exercise was concluded.

TF SWARMER's air transport arm consisted of a troop carrier division composed of the 314th Troop Carrier Group and 316th Troop Carrier Group (C-119/C-82) from Sewart Air Force Base, Tennessee, deployed to Laurinburg-Maxton Army Airfield, south of the Camp Mackall airhead, and a strategic air transport division, composed of the 8th Troop Carrier Squadron (C-54) from McChord Air Force Base, Washington and two strategic air transport groups, composed chiefly of Military Air Transport Service (MATS) units, deployed to Greenville Air Force Base, South Carolina. So extensive were the airlift requirements for the exercise that MATS and the Air Force Reserve were called upon for heavy commitments, the former for air transport units to be used for landing of troops in the airhead and for resupply operations and the latter for troop carrier units to be employed chiefly in the airlift of units and equipment to and from the maneuver area before and after the exercise.

The air transport forces participated in SWARMER in three phases. The opening phase, beginning on 14 April and continuing through 21 April, was devoted to training. Phase two, the assault, during which combat operations were initiated, began on 21 April and extended to D-day, 28 April, a period during which air superiority and interdiction missions were run in preparation for the D-day airdrop. During the final phase, termed the development of the objective, D-day through D plus 5, the air transport forces were occupied in airdrops and landings, and in maintaining a strategic airlift to supply the ground forces in the airhead.

== Results ==
Exercise SWARMER took on the proportions of a strategic airlift unprecedented in a peacetime maneuver. The logistics of the completely air-supported, air-delivered, and air-supplied military operation were initially considered a disappointment as opposed to projections when on D-day only 5,400 troops were delivered instead of the scheduled 8,000. The next day, transport aircraft were landing or taking off every minute and a half, and by D plus 3, over 15, 000 troops had been airlifted into the fight, along with 6,400 tons of supplies and equipment that included 2½-ton trucks and 105mm artillery howitzers. By the time four days of the exercise had passed, the results were considered to be “the biggest step forward since World War II” by the Chief of Staff of the United States Army. The exercise had demonstrated the ability of the armed forces to airlift and airdrop heavy equipment, to make mass tactical parachute jumps, and to conduct ground operations after the seizure of an airhead. From 28 April through 3 May, TF SWARMER's tactical air and bomber forces flew 3,344 sorties in air-defense, counter air, interdiction, reconnaissance, and close support missions. From 28 April through 3 May, TF SWARMER's 237 air transport aircraft flew 2,230 sorties while airdropping and landing 20,851 troops, 15,842 tons of supplies, and 3,098 vehicles and weapons in the airhead. However, the Air Force determined that existing numbers of transport aircraft were inadequate for the Army's airlift needs, with Major General James M. Gavin, special advisor to the Department of Defense for airborne operations, calling for an increase in the number of C-119 troop carrier groups.

Exercise SWARMER saw the service introduction of the first Parachute Rigger Badge, used by the 11th Parachute Maintenance Company, although the badge would not become official until 1986.

Note: Exercise SWARMER was the first real test of the C-119 Flying Boxcar for tactical suitability, and valuable lessons were learned. Serious doubts had been raised concerning the effectiveness of the C-82 Packet's internal centerline monorail as a device for discharging cargo. SWARMER demonstrated that the C-119's monorail could salvo supply bundles quickly and smoothly, with more than 300,000 pounds of equipment and supplies dropped without a malfunction. The C-119 also proved to be an outstanding contributor to the growing capability of troop carrier forces to airdrop heavy equipment. The C-119 dropped jeeps, trailers, and 105mm artillery howitzers with 90-foot parachutes. The C-119 also proved very useful in landing heavy equipment; it carried 2½-ton trucks, 155mm artillery howitzers, 90mm antitank guns, and 7½-ton Caterpillar D4 bulldozers (minus the blades). The C-119's cargo floor proved to be its only major weakness; heavy vehicles and the failure to use a sufficient number of load spreaders caused damage to the floors of several aircraft. One C-119 sustained a warped fuselage when loading a D-4 bulldozer. The recommended solution to this problem was that the C-119's cargo floor be strengthened; the use of more load spreaders, it was believed, would only add to the aircraft's already numerous pieces of equipment without solving the basic difficulty. Finally, the C-119 could only land at a prepared airfield; it could not perform an assault landing on an unprepared airfield.
