= Chase XCG-20 =

Transport glider, U.S. Air Force, 1950

XCG-20/XG-20
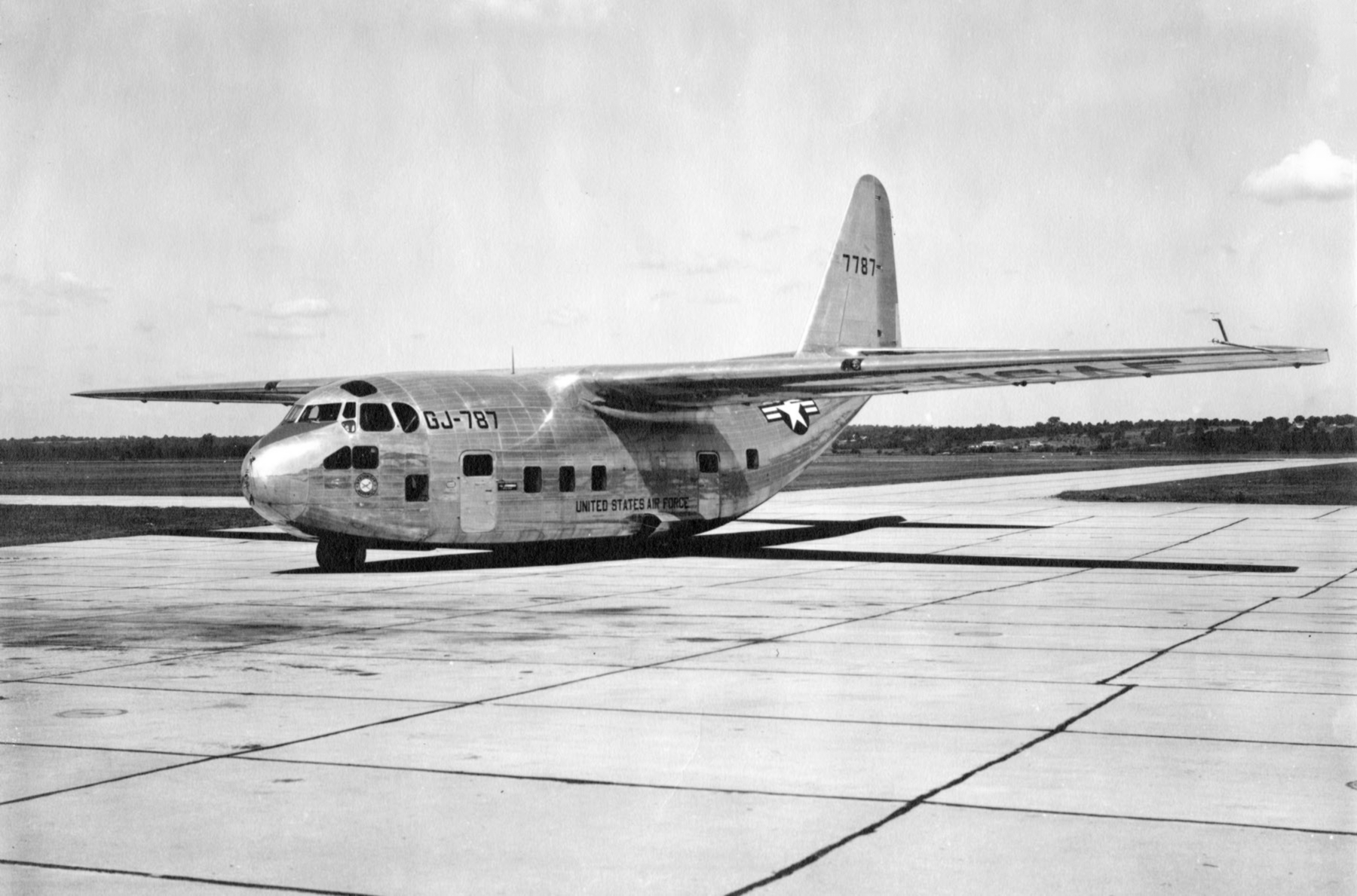
- The second XG-20 prototype

General information
- Type: Assault glider
- Manufacturer: Chase Aircraft
- Designer: Michael Stroukoff
- Primary user: United States Air Force
- Number built: 2

History
- First flight: April 1950
- Developed into: C-123 Provider; Chase XC-123A

The Chase XCG-20, also known as the XG-20 and by the company designation MS-8 Avitruc, was a large assault glider developed immediately after World War II by the Chase Aircraft Company for the United States Air Force, and was the largest glider ever built in the United States. The XG-20 did not see production due to a change in USAF requirements, however, it was modified into the successful Fairchild C-123 Provider twin-engined transport aircraft which saw extensive service in the Vietnam War.

== Design and development ==
Following the end of World War II, the United States Army Air Forces, which became the United States Air Force (USAF) in 1947, developed a requirement for a new, large assault glider type to replace smaller types that were then in service, all existing gliders having been declared obsolete. The new gliders were to be constructed entirely of metal, and were also required to be easily adaptable to a powered configuration. As part of a five-year development program, a contract was awarded to the Chase Aircraft Company of Trenton, New Jersey, in August 1946 for the construction of two types of gliders. These included a smaller model being designated XCG-18A, and the larger, definitive model being designated XCG-20.

The XCG-20, redesignated XG-20 in 1948 with the establishment of the USAF, was the largest glider ever constructed in the United States, and the last combat glider to be built for the U.S. military. It featured a high-mounted wing and retractable tricycle landing gear, with an auxiliary power unit supplying hydraulic power to the landing gear and flaps. The nose section was reinforced to provide optimal protection to the pilots in the event of a crash on landing, and to allow for the strongest possible towing connection. The cargo hold was 30 feet (9.1 m) long and 12 feet (3.7 m) wide; it featured an innovative configuration, the rear fuselage being upswept with an integrated loading ramp. This allowed vehicles to be driven directly on and off of the aircraft, speeding loading and unloading times.

== Operational history ==
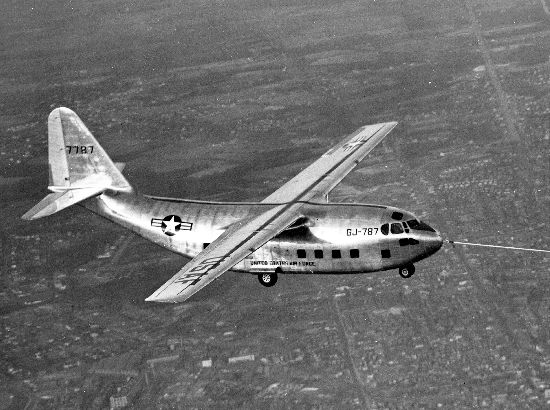
The second XG-20 (s/n 47-787) during flight trials.

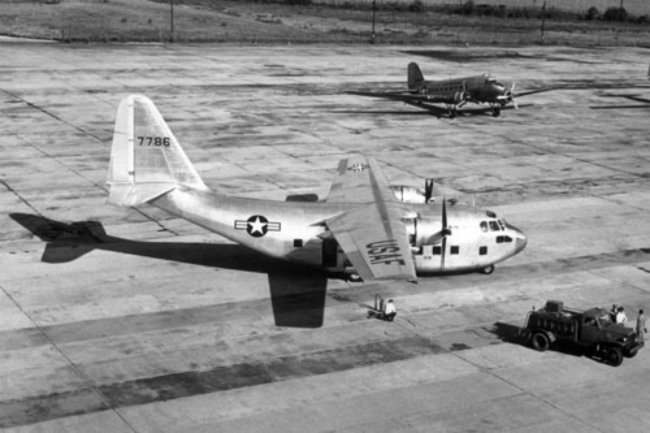
The XC-123 (s/n 47-786) in 1949.

Although the first prototype XG-20 never flew as a glider, the second prototype conducted the aircraft's first flight in April 1950. Following being displayed to the public at Pope Air Force Base as part of Exercise Swarmer during that month, the XG-20 underwent thorough flight testing; during the late summer, it was evaluated against a variety of other transport aircraft at Eglin Air Force Base in Florida. Although it possessed no obvious faults, the test program confirmed that the powered "assault transport" was the equal of the glider in landing performance; having been rendered obsolete, the assault glider fell out of favor with the Air Force, and the XG-20 project was cancelled.

However, Chase had designed the aircraft to allow for the easy installation of engines; the first XG-20 had already been modified with two radial piston engines, becoming the XC-123, the prototype of the long-serving C-123 Provider family of transports. Meanwhile, the second prototype XG-20 was returned to Chase Aircraft, to be fitted with two twin pods for General Electric J47 turbojets, becoming the XC-123A, the first jet-powered transport aircraft built in the United States.

== Specifications ==
Data from "C-123 Provider in action"

General characteristics

- Crew: 3
- Length: 77 ft 1 in (23.50 m)
- Wingspan: 110 ft 0 in (33.53 m)
- Height: 33 ft 10 in (10.31 m)
- Wing area: 1,222.78 sq ft (113.600 m^{2})
- Airfoil: NACA 23017
- Max takeoff weight: 70,000 lb (31,751 kg) limited by tow aircraft to 40,000 pounds (18,000 kg)

== See also ==
Related development

- Chase XC-123A
- Fairchild C-123 Provider
- Stroukoff YC-134

Aircraft of comparable role, configuration, and era

- Douglas XCG-17
- Ilyushin Il-32
- Messerschmitt Me 321
- Yakovlev Yak-14

Related lists

- List of military aircraft of the United States
