= AN/ALQ-221 =

Military aircraft radar warning receiver

AN/ALQ-221 Advanced Defensive System is a radar warning receiver and electronic countermeasures (ECM) system manufactured by BAE Systems in Nashua, New Hampshire, for use on US Air Force U-2 Dragonlady reconnaissance aircraft. Sometimes called the Advanced Defensive System (ADS), it provides U-2 pilots with situational awareness and protection against threats that might reach the aircraft at mission altitudes of 70,000 feet plus. The system, integrated with onboard ECM systems, is part of the Block 20 modernization program of the U-2 aircraft integrated with upgraded avionics and multifunction cockpit displays.

== History ==
Development of the ALQ-221 began in 2004 at the Nashua facilities of BAE, reaching Initial Operating Capability (IOC) in October of 2005. The system was delivered as part of the Reconnaissance Avionics Maintainability Program (RAMP). Reportedly, the system had a 2005 unit cost of $5.8 million per system.

In accordance with the Joint Electronics Type Designation System (JETDS), the "AN/ALQ-221" designation represents the 221st design of an Army-Navy electronic device for protective countermeasures system. The JETDS system also now is used to name all Department of Defense and some NATO electronic systems.

In 2018, plans were drafted to upgrade the system's low-band subsystem to operate in "moderately contested environments". Announced in March 2026, BAE was awarded a modernize and support contract for the ALQ-221 from their Nashua facilities.

== Technical description ==
The ALQ-221 detects, classifies and counters threats using 13 receivers and transmitters. Software allows the system's target recognition algorithms to be updated inflight.

== See also ==
- AN/ALR-20 – USAF B-52 electronic countermeasures receiver
- AN/ALR-46 – US military aircraft radar warning receiver
- AN/ALR-67 – Military aircraft radar warning receiver
- AN/ALQ-218 – US Navy/Marines military aircraft radar warning receiver
- List of military electronics of the United States
- Similar US military airborne ECM systems
