= CAG bird =

Specially painted US Navy aircraft

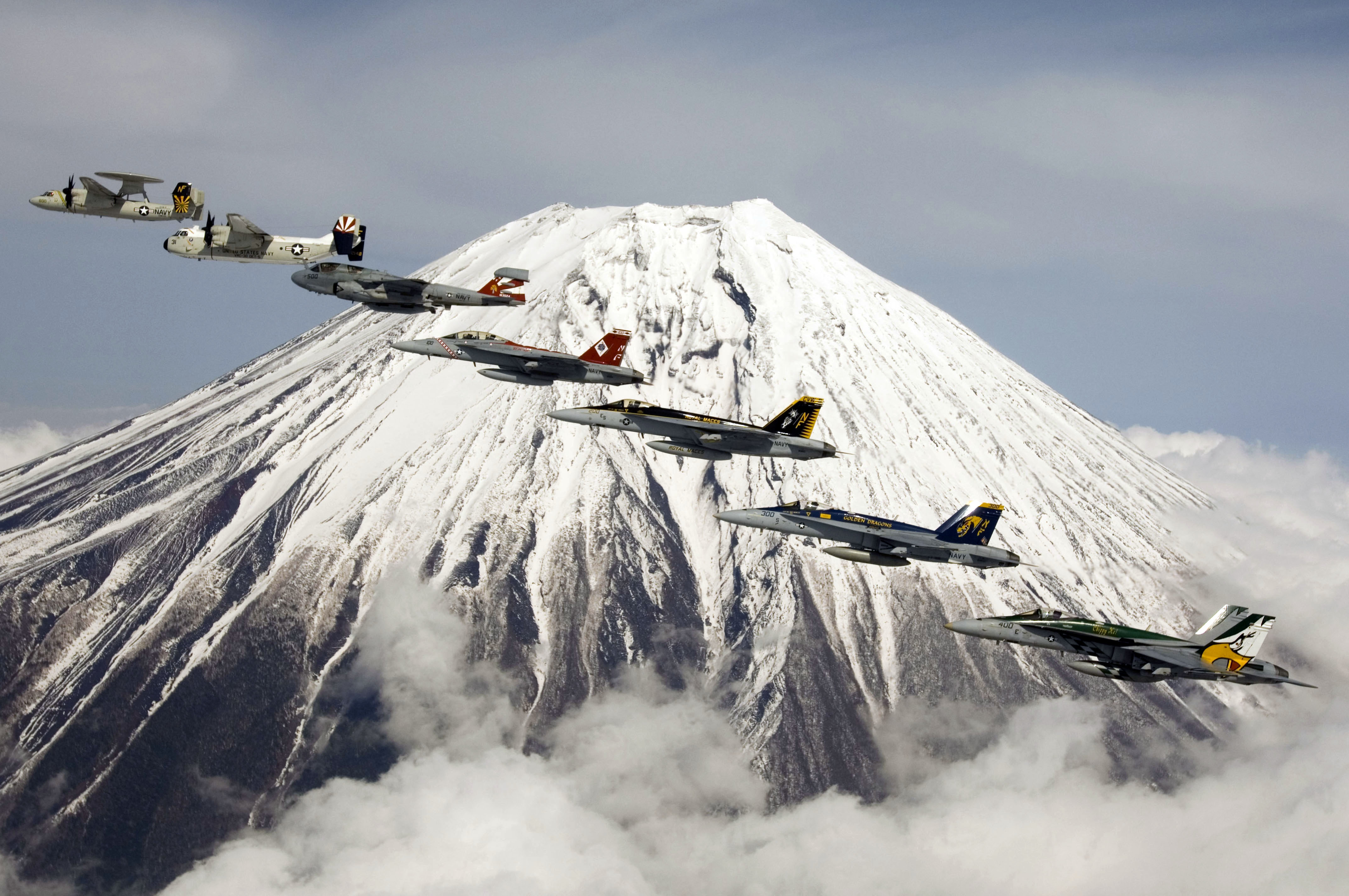
CAG birds of the CVW-5 flying in formation in front of Mount Fuji. Note that all aircraft have modexes ending with '00', while the first digit is related to the aircraft's own squadron.

CAG bird is a specially painted aircraft, officially flown by the commanding officer of United States Navy Carrier Air Groups. Every carrier-based aircraft squadron of the United States Navy has such an aircraft, which usually has a modex ending with "00" (two zeros). Due to their unique paint schemes, enthusiasts such as modelers and aircraft photographers show great interest in these aircraft. Similar terms for "CAG Birds" include:

- Show Bird
- Easter Egg
- Boss Machine
- Head Nuts
- Double Nuts
- Triple Nuts (F/A-18B used by VMFA-321 during mid to late 1990s).
