= VAQ-129 =

Electronic Attack Squadron 129
- Active: 1 May 1961 - Present (65 years, 5 months)
- Country: United States
- Branch: United States Navy
- Type: Electronic Attack
- Role: Fleet Replacement Squadron (FRS)
- Part of: Electronic Attack Wing Pacific
- Garrison/HQ: NAS Whidbey Island
- Nickname: Vikings
- Colors: #fe0000 #0000fe #fffc05
- Decorations: Commander Theodore G. Ellyson Award for Aviator Production Excellence
- Website: https://www.airpac.navy.mil/Organization/Electronic-Attack-Squadron-VAQ-129/

Commanders
- Commanding Officer: CDR. Joshua M. Ales
- Executive Officer: CDR. Sergio A. Armas
- Command Master Chief: CMDCM. Christopher O. Liam Jr

Insignia
- Callsign: FENIX
- Modex: 5XX
- Tail Code: NJ

Aircraft flown
- Electronic warfare: EKA-3B Skywarrior (1961-1971; EA-6B Prowler(1971-2015); EA-18G Growler(2008 – present)

Electronic Attack Squadron 129 (VAQ-129) is the United States Navy's only EA-18G Growler training squadron. Known as the "Vikings", they are a Fleet Replacement Squadron, or FRS, and are charged with training all EA-18G aviators and developing standard operating procedures for the maintenance and operation of the aircraft. The squadron is permanently stationed at Naval Air Station Whidbey Island, in Puget Sound, Washington.

== Operational history ==
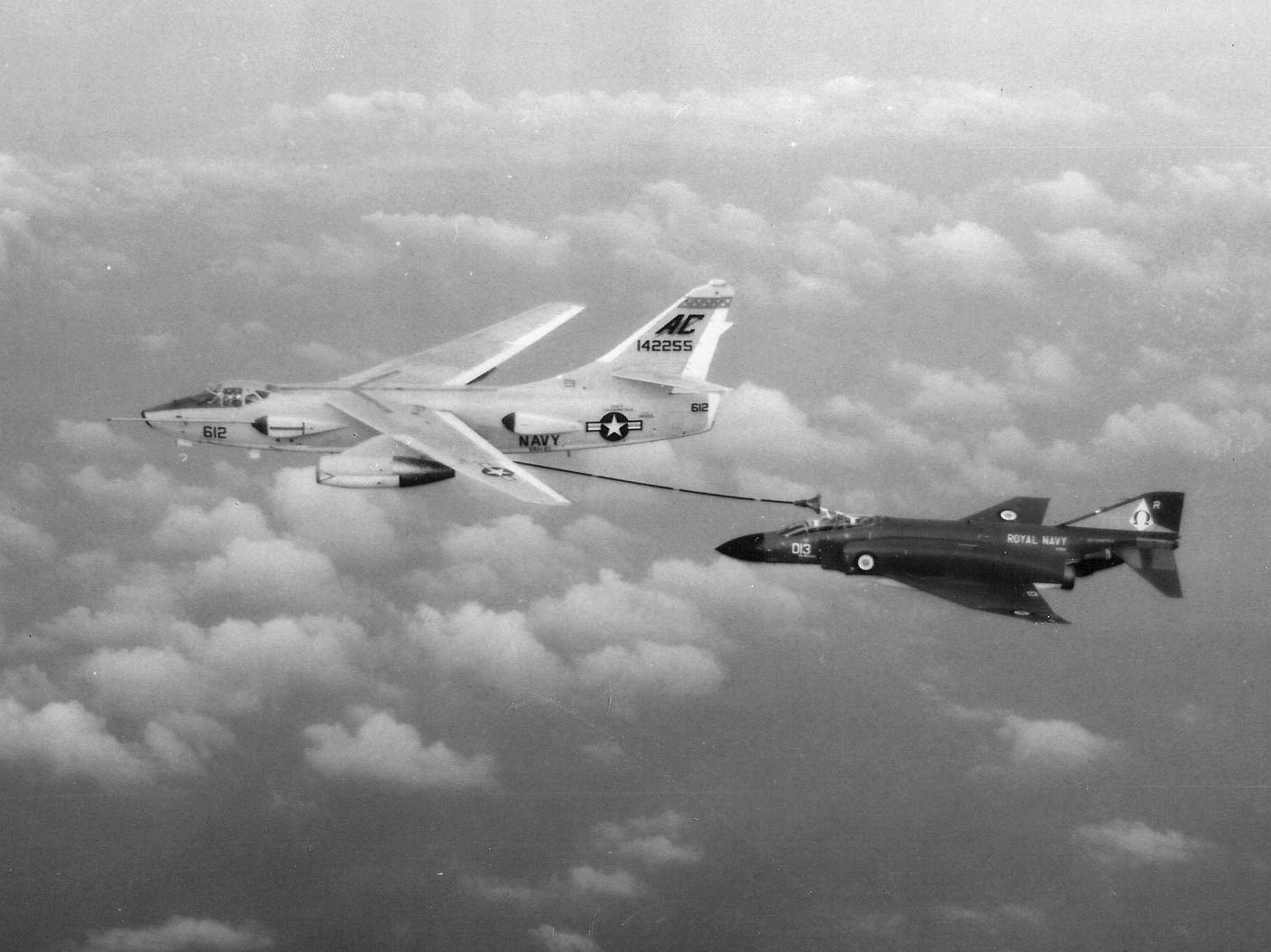
VAH-10 EKA-3B refuels an 892 NAS Phantom FG.1 c.1969

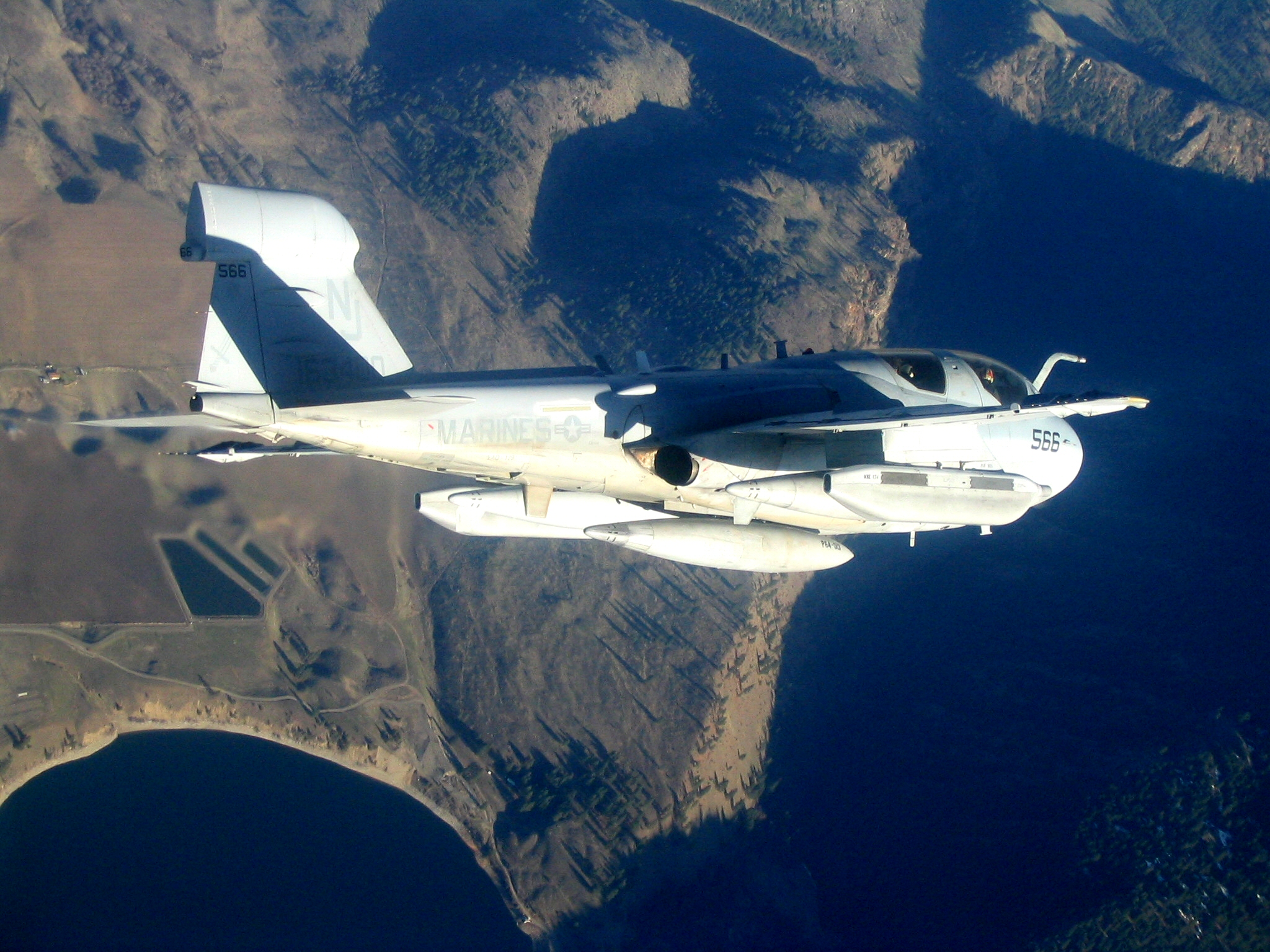
An VAQ-129 EA-6B in 2004.

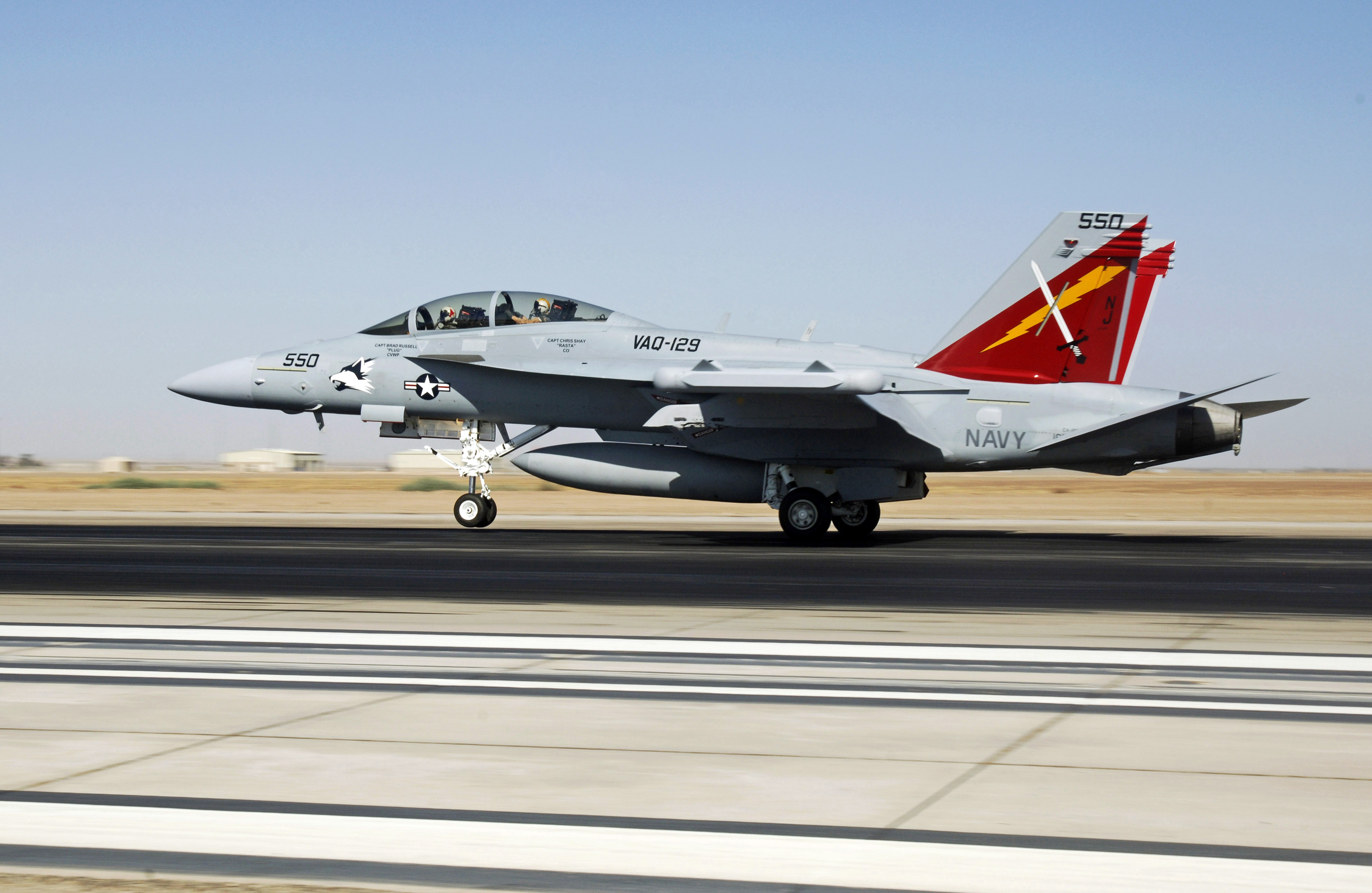
An EA-18G Growler of VAQ-129 in October 2008 at NAF El Centro.

=== VAH-10 ===
Heavy Attack Squadron 10 (VAH-10) was established on 1 May 1961 and originally equipped with the A-3 Skywarrior.

During the Vietnam War detachments from VAH-10 were deployed on the following aircraft carriers operating on Yankee and Dixie Stations:

- 14 April-14 December 1964, Detachment A-3Bs were embarked on USS Ticonderoga
- 5 May 1964 – 1 February 1965, A-3Bs were embarked on USS Constellation
- 21 June 1966 – 21 February 1967, Detachment 42 A-3Bs were embarked on USS Franklin D. Roosevelt
- 6 June-15 September 1967, Detachment 59 KA-3Bs were embarked on USS Forrestal
- 10 April-16 December 1968, Detachment 66 KA-3Bs were embarked on USS America
- 7 September 1968 – 18 April 1969, Detachment 43 KA-3Bs were embarked on USS Coral Sea
- 26 October 1968 – 17 May 1969, Detachment 61 KA-3Bs were embarked on USS Ranger
- 2 August 1969 – 15 April 1970, Detachment 19 KA-3Bs were embarked on USS Hancock
- 5 March-17 December 1970, Detachment 38 KA-3Bs were embarked on USS Shangri-La
- 22 October 1970 – 3 June 1971, Detachment 62 KA-3Bs were embarked on USS Hancock

=== VAQ-129 ===
VAH-10 was re-designated Tactical Electronic Warfare Squadron One Two Nine (TACELECWARON129) (VAQ-129) flying the EA-6B Prowlers on 1 September 1970. The change in name brought with it a change in mission. The first EA-6B standard version Prowler was delivered in January 1971. With its arrival, VAQ-129 commenced its career as the Fleet Replacement Squadron for EA-6B fleet commands.

In January 1977, the Navy introduced the first of its Improved Capability (ICAP) version Prowlers. In March 1977, VAQ-129 began training United States Marine Corps aircrew and maintenance personnel to fly and maintain the ICAP version of the aircraft, starting a long training relationship with the Marine Corps. In 1984, the first ICAP II version of the EA-6B arrived.

The Vikings introduced the AGM-88A High Speed Anti-Radiation Missile (HARM) to the EA-6B in 1986 and the Lancers (VAQ-131) were the first to successfully fire the AGM-88 from the EA-6B. In 1988 they introduced the new "Block 86" version of the ICAP II Prowler. During Operation Desert Storm, an updated HARM capability was introduced, which proved tremendously successful in the subsequent combat operations.

August 1992 saw the Executive Officer's billet filled by a USMC Lieutenant Colonel, further strengthening VAQ-129's relationship with the Marine Corps. In the summer of 2005 the new ICAP III was delivered to the community to pave the way for the follow on platform of the EA-18G.

The retirement of the U.S. Air Force's EF-111A Raven in 1998 made the EA-6B and EA-18G the only tactical aircraft in the U.S. inventory capable of performing electronic attack.

On 5 August 2009, EA-18G Growlers from VAQ-129 and Electronic Attack Squadron 132 (VAQ-132) completed their first at-sea carrier-arrested landing (trap) aboard USS Harry S. Truman.

In 2013, VAQ-129 began training Royal Australian Air Force aircrew to operate the EA-18G.

On 17 May 2026, two of their aircraft collided at Mountain Home Air Force Base during the Gunfighter Skies Air Show; all four crew members ejected and survived.

== See also ==
- History of the United States Navy
- List of United States Navy aircraft squadrons
