= Electronic warfare officer =

United States Air Force specialization

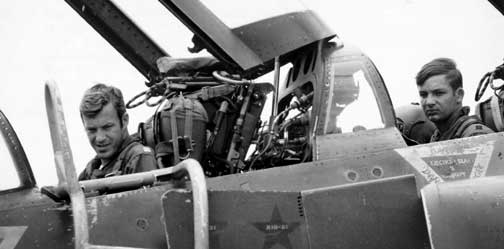
Electronic Warfare Officer Charles B. DeBellevue behind pilot Richard S. Ritchie aboard a F-4 Phantom II during the Vietnam War.

In the United States Air Force, an electronic warfare officer (EWO) is an aerial navigator who has received training in enemy threat systems, electronic warfare principles and overcoming enemy air defense systems.

== General tasks ==
=== Radar jamming ===
These officers are specialists in finding, identifying and countering air defense systems and also radar-, infrared- and optically guided surface-to-air missiles, anti-aircraft artillery as well as enemy fighter planes. In aircraft that could penetrate enemy airspace EWOs protect their aircraft using radar jamming, chaff and flares to deceive potential threats.

=== Surveillance ===
In other aircraft EWOs work to gather intelligence information on potential enemy air defense systems and communication systems. These types of mission are commonly known as Ferret missions.

== Training ==
=== United States ===
For decades the U.S. Air Force used fully-trained navigator officers as EWO trainees, or EWOT. Their primary training was carried out by the 453d Flying Training Squadron at the former Mather AFB, California near Sacramento. Their follow-on training as EWOs, called "Combat Crew Training School" (CCTS), was usually carried out at the units to which they had been assigned.

The B-52 Stratofortress CCTS was conducted at Castle AFB, California in B-52G models. B-52H model differential training was conducted at the gaining Unit location. EWOs could also be assigned to F-105G Thunderchief Wild Weasels, F-4 Phantom II, F-111 Aardvark, C-130 Hercules versions (MC-130, EC-130, etc.), B-1 Lancer or a number of versions of the RC-135.

As an example, the EWO in a B-52 is trained in the use of a variety of active and passive electronic countermeasures (ECM) techniques and equipment. Active jammers include the AN/ALQ-155 Power Management System, AN/ALQ-117, AN/ALQ-172, AN/ALT-16, AN/ALQ-122, AN/ALQ-153 Tail Warning System and the low-band communications jammer set AN/ALT-32. The EWO monitors the electromagnetic environment through the use of radar receivers such as the AN/ALR-46 and AN/ALR-20A. Additionally, the EWO has command of AN/ALE-24 chaff and AN/ALE-20 flare set for self-protection.

== Training courses ==
The EWO basic course training was conducted at the 563d Flying Training Squadron at Randolph AFB, Texas. It was a 12-week program for B-52, AC/MC/EC-130, U-28 and RC-135 EWOs. Selected F-15E and B-1 WSOs also attended the 12-week program. Students went from undergraduate navigator training at the 562d FTS and from WSO to their follow-on training. Upon completion the EWOs were presented with their wings and the WSOs achieved their upgrades. The school was relocated, redesigned and reopened as a CSO school at NAS Pensacola, Fl. The last class to graduate from Randolph AFB was in October 2010.

Currently all Navigator, Electronic Warfare Officer and Weapons Systems Officer Training is located at the Naval Air Station Pensacola. The training period is 12 months not including initial flight screening. Beginning in 2009, U.S. Air Force candidates for Electronic Warfare Officer and Weapons Systems Officer were trained alongside traditional navigators in a new career field, the "Combat Systems Officer".

== Other countries ==
=== United Kingdom ===
The United Kingdom has conducted its Ferret missions largely from RAF Wyton in Cambridgeshire, supported by electronic warfare technicians.

== See also ==
- Association of Old Crows
