= VAQ-144 =

Electronic Attack Squadron 144
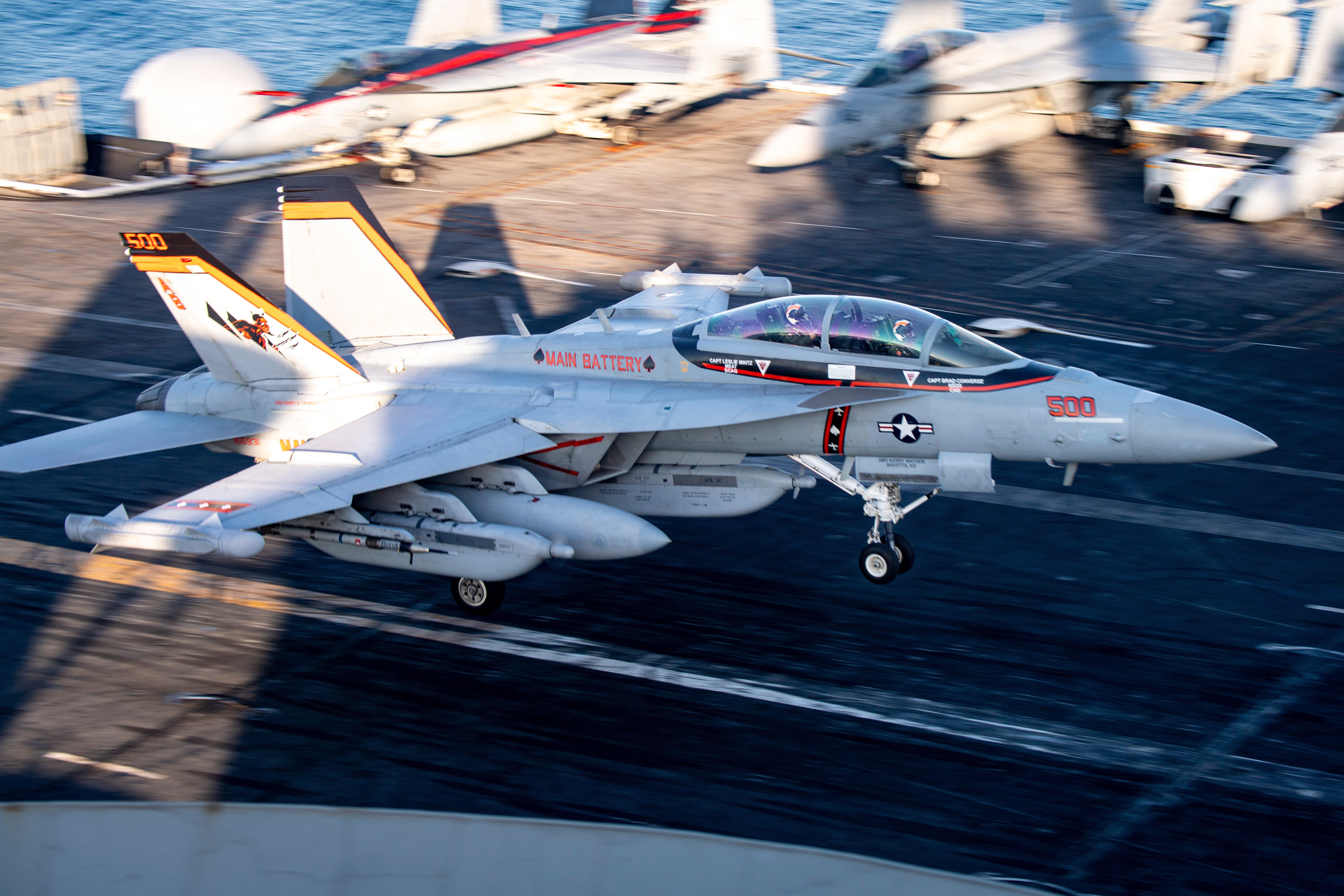
- A VAQ-144 EA-18G Growler lands on the USS Harry S. Truman (CVN-75) in 2024
- Active: 1 October 2021–present (4 years, 6 months)
- Country: United States
- Branch: United States Navy
- Type: Electronic Attack
- Role: Electronic Warfare
- Part of: Carrier Air Wing One
- Garrison/HQ: NAS Whidbey Island
- Nickname: Main Battery
- Mottos: "Dealers of deception in the dark", "The devil is in the details"
- Colors: #ec6924 #be5227 #000000
- Mascot: Devil
- Engagements: Operation Prosperity Guardian; Operation Poseidon Archer
- Website: https://www.airpac.navy.mil/Organization/Electronic-Attack-Squadron-VAQ-144/

Commanders
- Commanding Officer: CDR Lampshade
- Executive Officer: CDR Dee Dee
- Command Master Chief: CMDCM La Tormenta

Insignia
- VAQ-144 insignia
- Callsign: DEVIL
- Modex: 5XX
- Tail Code: AB

Aircraft flown
- Electronic warfare: EA-18G Growler (2023–present)

Electronic Attack Squadron 144 (VAQ-144), "Main Battery", is a United States Navy aircraft squadron based at Naval Air Station Whidbey Island, flying the EA-18G Growler.

== History ==
VAQ-144 can trace its origins to the former Grumman A-6 Intruder squadron VA-196 formerly also based at NAS Whidbey Island that was disestablished in 1997 as the last operational A-6 squadron on the west coast.

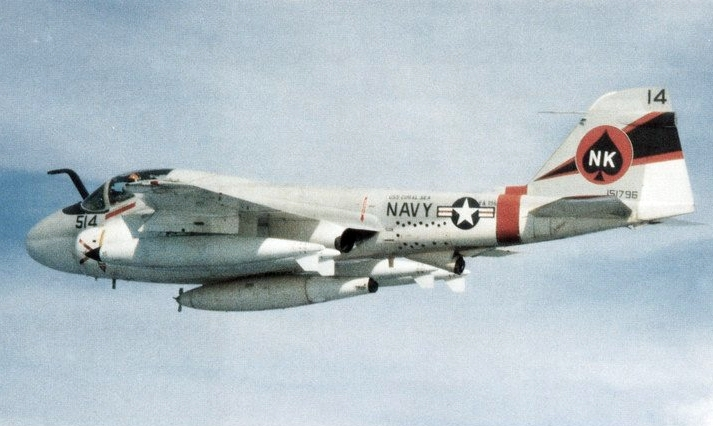
VA-196 KA-6D Intruder in flight c. 1982

=== VAQ-144 ===
In September 2019 the Navy transitioned a Carrier Air Wing (CVW) VAQ squadron out of the carrier environment to meet demands as an expeditionary unit. The gap in CVW Electronic Attack coverage showed a need for a 15th operational VAQ squadron. VAQ-144 was established on 1 Oct 2021 to meet this demand with a requirement to meet scheduled milestones and achieve full operational capability in fiscal year 2023. In the spring of 2023, the squadron received its first independent aircraft flown with VAQ-144 markings.

In late September 2024, VAQ-144 and their EA-18Gs departed the US as part of CVW-1 on a scheduled deployment aboard the USS Harry S. Truman

Following multiple exercises with European militaries, VAQ-144 and CVW-1 were ordered to operate in the Red Sea in defense of international shipping lanes and Israel against Houthi/Iran proxy military unit attacks from Yemen. VAQ-144 and CVW-1 arrived in the CENTCOM AOR in mid December 2024 with combat operations against the Houthis/Iranians commencing upon arrival to the Red Sea.

Airstrikes were undertaken against the Houthis/Iranians for much of the later half of December 2024 through April 2025. Strikes against the Houthis/Iranian proxy military units in Yemen increased significantly following March 15, 2025, with VAQ-144 and CVW-1 conducting increased sorties on a larger set of enemy targets.

== See also ==
- List of United States Navy aircraft squadrons
- VA-196 (U.S. Navy)
