= VAQ-133 =

Electronic Attack Squadron 133
- Active: 14 March 1969 - 1 Jun 1992, 1 April 1996 - Present (56 years, 11 months)
- Country: United States
- Branch: United States Navy
- Type: Electronic Attack
- Role: Electronic Warfare
- Part of: Carrier Air Wing 9
- Garrison/HQ: NAS Whidbey Island
- Nickname: Wizards
- Motto: Push it up!
- Colors: #ac1f24 #ffca0e #000000
- Engagements: Operation Desert Storm; Operation Northern Watch; Operation Southern Watch; Operation New Dawn; Operation Enduring Freedom; Operation Freedom's Sentinel; Operation Inherent Resolve; Operation Prosperity Guardian; Operation Poseidon Archer; Operation Epic Fury
- Decorations: Safety "S" (5); Battle "E" (3); Top Hook (4); Tactical Excellence Award (2)
- Website: https://www.airpac.navy.mil/Organization/Electronic-Attack-Squadron-VAQ-133/

Commanders
- Commanding Officer: CDR. Erik Dente
- Executive Officer: CDR. Ian Chamberlin
- Command Master Chief: CMDCM. Frederick J. Tuiel

Insignia
- Callsign: MAGIC
- Modex: 5XX
- Tail Code: NG

Aircraft flown
- Bomber: KA-3B Skywarrior (1969-1971)
- Electronic warfare: EKA-3B Skywarrior (1969-1971); EA-6B Prowler(1971-1992, 1996-2013); EA-18G Growler(2013-Present)

Electronic Attack Squadron 133 (VAQ-133) is an EA-18G Growler squadron of the United States Navy based at Naval Air Station Whidbey Island, Washington. Beginning in 2013, the squadron began the transition from the EA-6B to the EA-18G. Upon completion of the transition in spring of 2014, they returned to their attachment to Carrier Air Wing Nine. The squadron's nickname is "Wizards" and its radio callsign is "Magic".

== Squadron history ==
There have been two squadrons designated VAQ-133. The first squadron was established 4 March 1969 at Naval Air Station Alameda, California. The squadron originally flew the EKA-3B Skywarrior. In August 1971, it relocated to NAS Whidbey Island and transitioned to the EA-6B Prowler. That squadron was disestablished in June 1992.

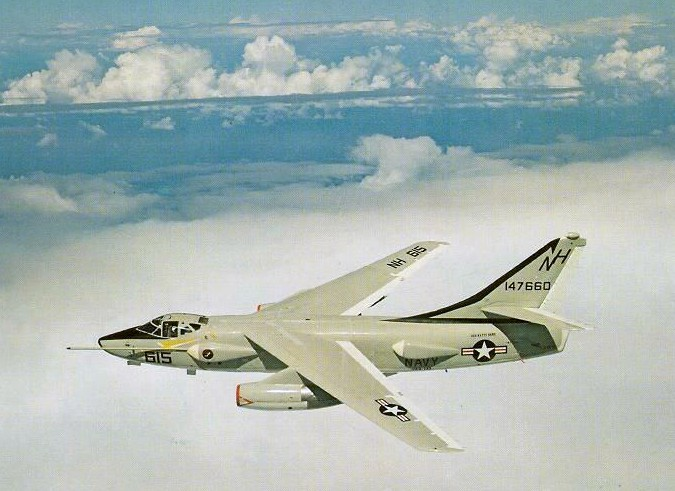
VAQ-133 EKA-3B, 1971

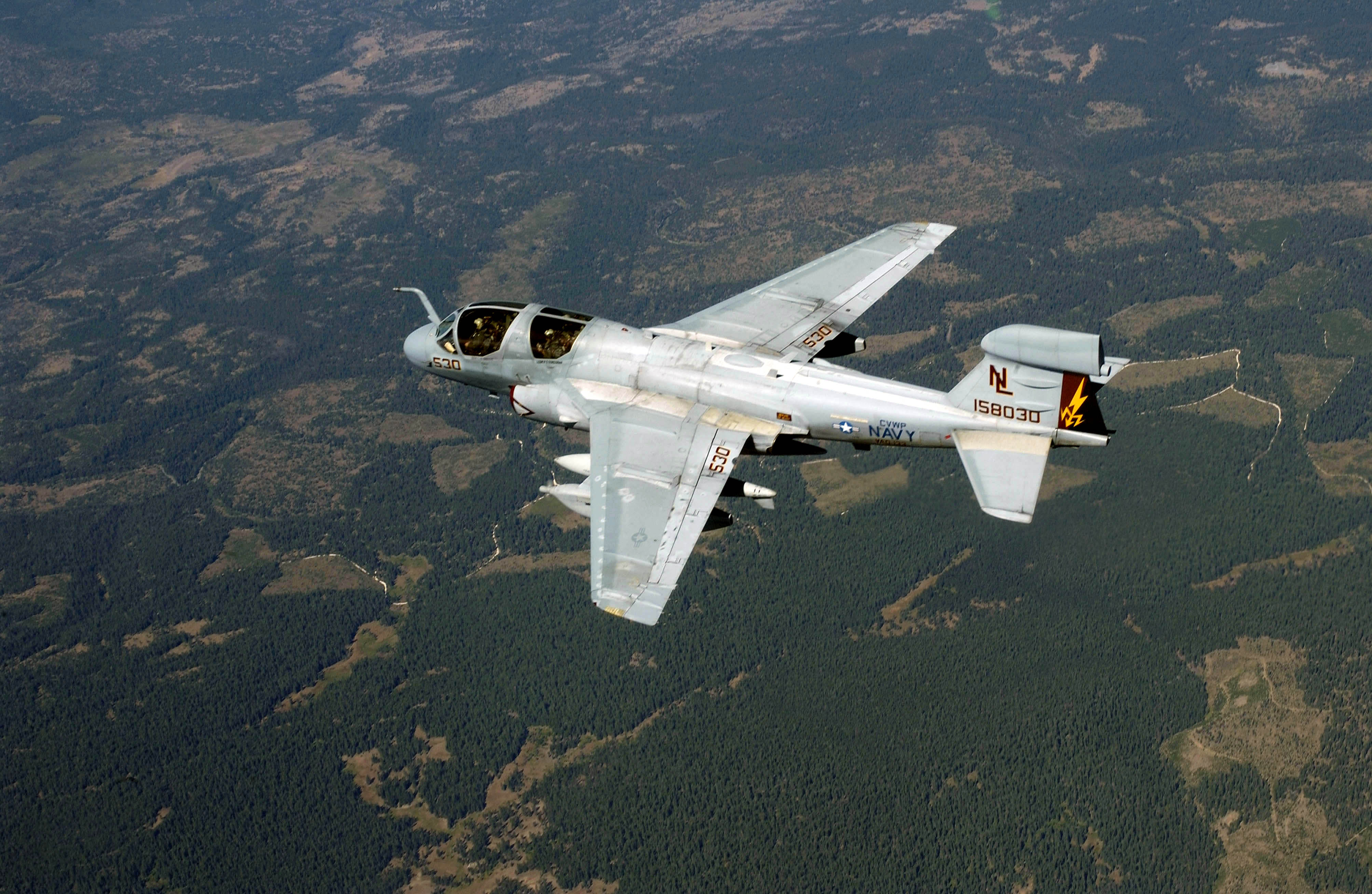
VAQ-133 EA-6B, 2005.

The current squadron, Electronic Attack Squadron 133 is the second squadron to use that designation. It was established on 1 April 1996 as a land based "expeditionary" squadron flying the EA-6B Prowler. In August 2010 it was assigned to Carrier Air Wing 9. It continues to be a carrier based squadron to the present. Following the 2012-2013 deployment of Carrier Air Wing 9 on board USS John C. Stennis, VAQ-133 was reassigned to Carrier Air Wing Eight based aboard USS George H.W. Bush. This reassignment was originally slated to occur in January 2014 but changing operational requirements accelerated this reassignment until immediately after the end of the 2012-2013 deployment. As of mid-2014, VAQ-133 made a transition from the EA-6B to the EA-18G. In 2018 VAQ-133 embarked on an "Around the World" cruise on board the USS John C. Stennis (CVN 74). During this deployment they flew their first E/A-18G combat missions into Operations INHERENT RESOLVE and FREEDOM’S SENTINEL.

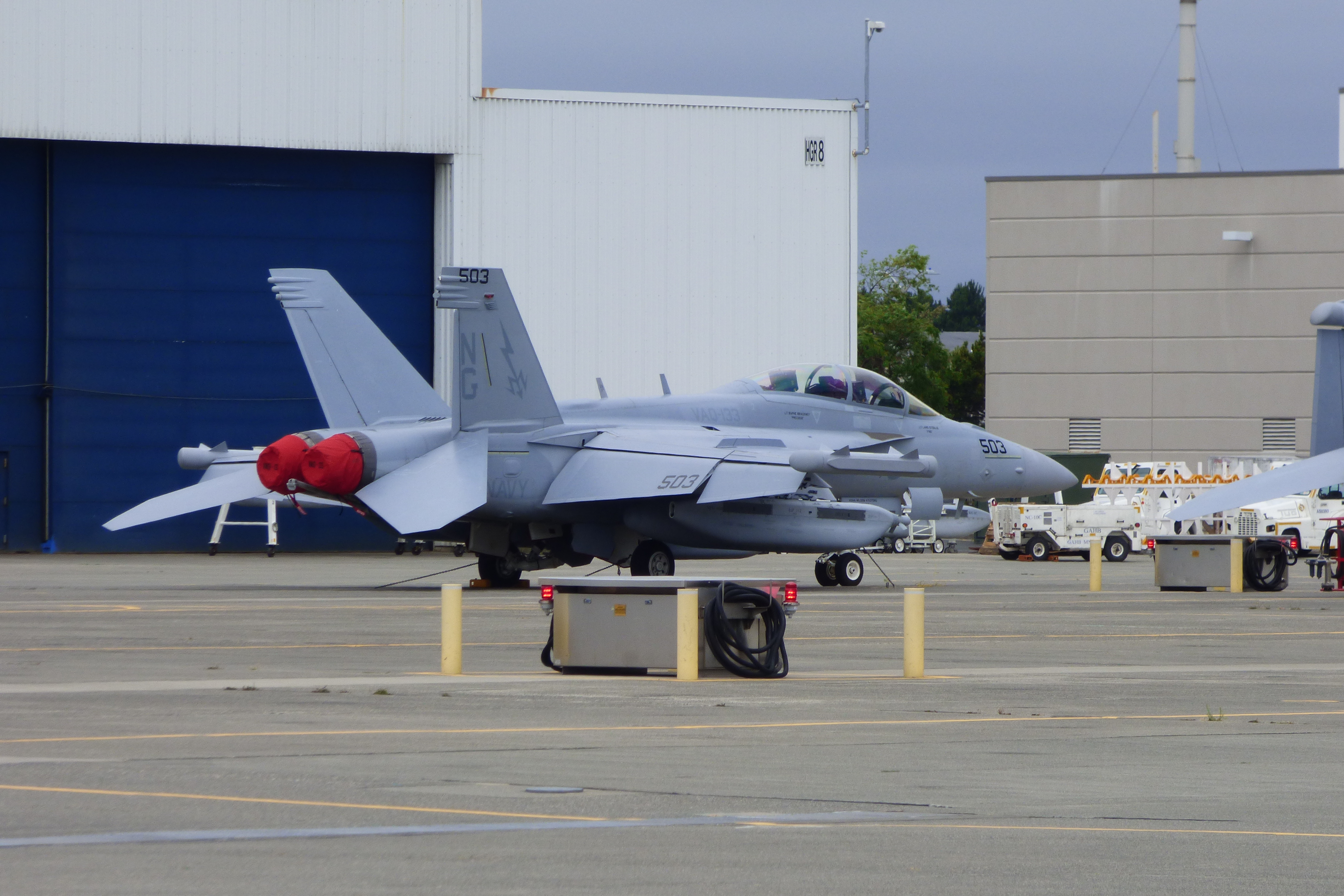
VAQ-133 EA-18G at NAS Whidbey Island, July 2014.

In 2024, VAQ-133 embarked on the USS Abraham Lincoln with Carrier Air Wing 9 for a 5-month deployment. E/A-18G's performed attacks on the Houthis from the Lincoln in the Red Sea.

In late Feb 2026, as part of CVW-9, VAQ-133 and their E/A-18Gs, operating off the USS Abraham Lincoln, undertook combat sorties within Operation Epic Fury against Iran.

== See also ==
- History of the United States Navy
- List of United States Navy aircraft squadrons
