= AN/ALR-67 radar warning receiver =

Military aircraft radar warning receiver

AN/ALR-67
- Radar Warning Receiver

Manufacturing Info
- Manufacturer(s): Litton Industries, Northrop Grumman, Raytheon

Specifications
- Frequency Range: 0.5–20 GHz (60.0–1.5 cm)
- Weight: 99 pounds (45 kg)

Usage
- Used by country: See § Foreign military sales
- Platform(s): A-6E Intruder, AV-8B Harrier II Plus, EA-6B Prowler, F-14 Tomcat, F/A-18 Hornet, F/A-18E/F Super Hornet
- Variants: AN/ALR-67(V); AN/ALR-67(V)2; AN/ALR-67(V)3

The AN/ALR-67 radar warning receiver (RWR) is an electronic warfare receiver designed to warn an aircraft's crew of potentially hostile radar activity. It is a combined threat warning and electronic countermeasures control system built to be successor for the United States Navy's AN/ALR-45 utilized on several aircraft types including the A-6E Intruder (SWIP), AV-8B Harrier II Plus, EA-6B Prowler, F-14 Tomcat, and F/A-18 Hornet/Super Hornet.

In accordance with the Joint Electronics Type Designation System (JETDS), the "AN/ALR-67" designation represents the 67th design of an Army-Navy airborne electronic device for countermeasures receiver equipment. The JETDS system also now is used to name all Department of Defense and some NATO electronic systems.

== Description ==
Weighing in at 99 pounds (45 kg), the ALR-67 uses four antennas installed at various locations around the aircraft, each having about a 180° conical field of view or aperture. The original system primarily received and processed radar signals between 1 and 16 GHz (30.0 and 1.9 cm) providing threat identification and relative bearing to the aircrew. Today, after several upgrades, the system covers several IEEE radar bands including UHF/L/S/C/X/K_{u} and into the K-band, from 0.5 to 20 GHz (60.0 to 1.5 cm).

The primary display of threats to the aircew is a circular presentation with concentric rings extending from the middle of the screen. Symbols of alpha-numeric code representing various radar threats appear on the display according to the computed direction of the threat relative to the aircraft. The concentric rings do not represent distance to the threat, but rather the computed threat level, with greater threats displayed closer to the center of the screen and less important threats toward the edge of the display.

Initially a stand-alone system, the ALR-67 integrates and coordinates its operation with onboard fire-control radars, data links, jammers, missile detection systems.

== History ==
In the early 1970s, the US Navy established a requirement for a third-generation radar warning receiver specifically designed for the EA-6B, an electronic warfare aircraft. The program would be called CWCS (Countermeasures Warning and Control System). In 1974, the Navy released a solicitation for companies to bid on the CWCS development program which was awarded to Litton Industries' Applied Technology division in 1975. Applied Technology went on to produce many different RWR systems for the US military, so that by the time of Desert Storm in 1990, Litton RWR systems were aboard 80% of the 1,000 U.S. fixed wing aircraft and 100% of Canadian and Kuwaiti combat aircraft. At that time, AN/ALR-67 were employed on A-6, AV-8B, F/A-18, and F-14A aircraft.

The Navy issued an Engineering Change Proposal, ECP-510, to upgrade the original ALR-67. The card-for-card upgrade significantly increased signal sensitivity as well as an increase in computer pulse processing capabilities. The original AN/ALR-67 was produced by Litton Industries. But Northrop Grumman's Electronic Systems in Rolling Meadows, Illinois was the manufacturer for the follow-on AN/ALR-67(V) and (V)2 variants.

In the mid-1990s, Raytheon Electronic Warfare Systems of Goleta, California was the prime contractor for the fourth-generation AN/ALR-67(V)3 Advanced Special Receiver. Low rate initial production (LRIP) was attained in June 1998, and initial operating capability (IOC) was announced in 2003.

== Foreign military sales ==
=== Australia ===
Australia's Defence Science and Technology Organisation (DSTO) and AWA Defence Industries (AWADI) developed the ALR-2002 RWR system beginning in 1992. Although designed for Royal Australian Air Force F-111 Aardvark aircraft requirements, the 15-month A$4,950,000 program never progressed beyond concept demonstration. Australian newspaper The Age much later reported on 13 September 2006, the Australian Defence Minister accepted a recommendation to stop development of the ALR-2002 for the RAAF F/A-18, and instead most likely install the ALR-67V(3).

Years later, on 27 February 2013, the US Department of Defense's Defense Security Cooperation Agency (DSCA) notified the US Congress of a possible Foreign Military Sales (FMS) to Australia of twelve each F/A-18E/F Super Hornet and EA-18G Growler aircraft to include 24 of the ALR-67(V)3 RWR systems and many other supporting systems. This sale was estimated at a cost of US$3.7 billion

=== Canada ===
On 3 August 2007, the DSCA notified Congress of a potential FMS to Canada of fifty-nine ALR-67(V)3 receivers, associated equipment and services for Royal Canadian Air Force CF-18 Hornet aircraft. The estimated value was US$209 million. This notice of a potential sale is required by law; it does not mean that the sale has been concluded.

=== Kuwait ===
The DSCA further announced on 17 November 2016 the State Department approved a possible FMS to Kuwait of F/A-18E/F Super Hornets worth an estimated US$10.1 billion. The sale included aircraft, support, equipment and training. Forty-five AN/ALR-67(V)3 systems were included in the package.

=== Finland ===
Approval by the State Department of another possible foreign military sales to Finland of both F/A-18E/F Super Hornet and EA-18G Growler aircraft was announced by DSCA on 9 October 2020. The sale, with an estimated cost of US$14.7 billion, included aircraft, weapons and related equipment.

== See also ==
- AN/ALR-20 – USAF B-52 electronic countermeasures receiver
- AN/ALR-46 – US military aircraft radar warning receiver
- AN/ALQ-218 – US Navy/Marines military aircraft radar warning receiver
- List of military electronics of the United States
- Similar US military countermeasures warning receivers
