= AN/ALQ-218 =

US Navy/Marines military aircraft radar warning receiver

- Radar warning receiver
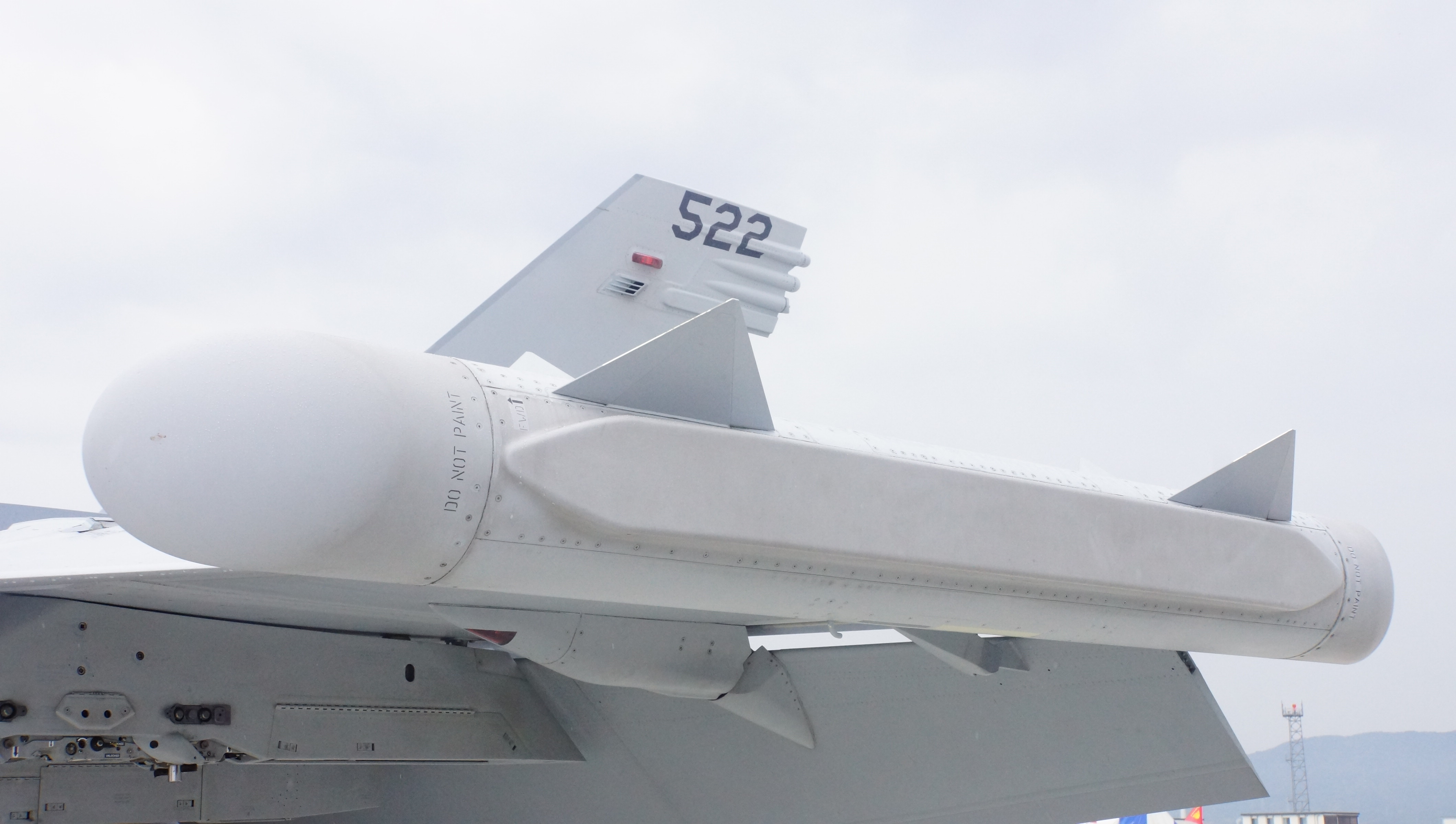
- AN/ALQ-218(V)2 on the wingtip of an EA-18G Growler

Manufacturing Info
- Manufacturer: Northrop Grumman

Usage
- Used by Aircraft: EA-18G Growler
- Used by Country: United States
- Used by Military: US Navy

The AN/ALQ-218 is an American airborne electronic warfare radar warning receiver (RWR) system, found on Northrop Grumman EA-6B Prowler and Boeing EA-18G Growler aircraft.

In accordance with the Joint Electronics Type Designation System (JETDS), the "AN/ALQ-218" designation represents the 218th design of an Army-Navy airborne electronic device for special countermeasures equipment. The JETDS system also now is used to name all Department of Defense and some NATO electronic systems.

== Description ==
The AN/ALQ-218 is an airborne passive radar warning receiver / electronic warfare support measures / electronic signals intelligence (RWR/ESM/ELINT) sensor system designed for airborne situational awareness and signal intelligence gathering. It detects, identifies, locates and analyzes sources of radio frequency emissions. The current version AN/ALQ-218(V)2 is manufactured by Northrop Grumman.

The AN/ALQ-249 Next Generation Jammer Mid-Band (NGJ-MB) is able to integrate with AN/ALQ-218.

== Platforms ==
The ALQ-218 is mainly featured aboard the US Navy's EA-18G Growler aircraft, which has replaced the EA-6B Prowler. The ALQ-218 was previously on the EA-6B Prowler, after which the Improved Capability III (ICAP III) ALQ-218 was modified and integrated into the EA-18G's Airborne Electronic Attack (AEA) system. Avionics from the EA-6B were modified to fit into the gun bay and wing tip pods of the Growler.

The EA-18G may carry up to an additional five jamming pods on under wing pylons. The system is being considered for modification to serve on unmanned aerial vehicles. The Growler is part of the same family of aircraft as the F/A-18E/F Super Hornet.

== See also ==
- AN/ALR-20 – USAF B-52 electronic countermeasures receiver
- AN/ALR-46 – US military aircraft radar warning receiver
- AN/ALR-67 – US military aircraft radar warning receiver
- List of military electronics of the United States
