= AN/ASQ-213 HARM targeting system =

US military aircraft HARM targeting pod

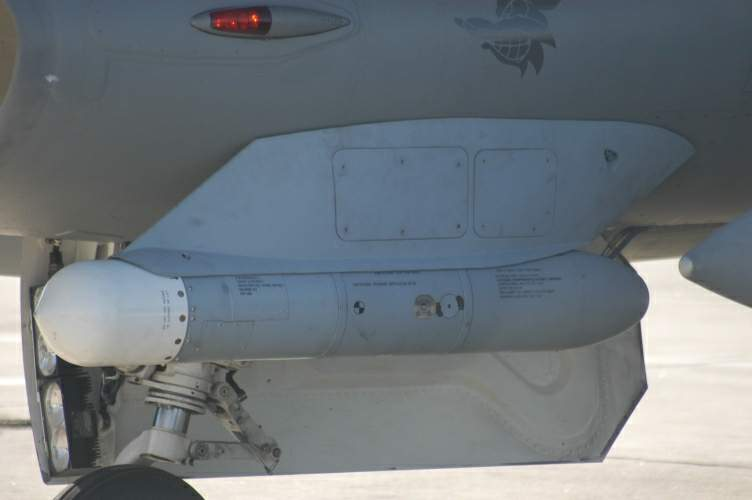
AN/ASQ-213 HARM Targeting Systems (HTS)

The AN/ASQ-213 HARM targeting system (HTS) is a targeting pod mounted to either of the engine inlet hardpoints of an F-16 Fighting Falcon aircraft. It enables the aircraft to track the location of hostile radar systems in any weather, and identify them to allow for usage of the AGM-88 HARM missile or other air-to-ground weapons. It greatly assists in Suppression of Enemy Air Defenses (SEAD) and Destruction of Enemy Air Defenses (DEAD) operations, where surface-to-air missile (SAM) sites are directly attacked or threatened, and therefore suppressed, by aircraft carrying anti-radar missiles and other munitions. While the firing of anti-radar missiles (AGM-88 HARM) in Harm As Sensor (HAS) mode, an HTS pod greatly reduces the workload of the pilot, increases the precision of the HARM, and allows HARMs to be fired while pointed away from the SAM site being attacked when in Equation of Motion (EOM) mode.

As an aircraft maneuvers closer to a SAM site and is scanned by the radar for longer periods, the quality of the HTS pod's report of the location of the SAM site increases. This is represented by the PGM (Position Quality) number. A single F-16 is capable of attaining a PGM5 track, the lowest quality track, up to PGM2. When combined with the F-16's Link 16 datalink system, a team of aircraft is capable of Pseudo-range multilateration to obtain the position of SAM systems with a high degree of accuracy, allowing for the highest quality track, PGM1.

In combat, the pod displays the range, bearing, and type of threats to the aircraft in relation to itself. During flight, the pilot may adjust the area scanned by the pod as well as the frequencies scanned to optimize threat detection and ranging.

== Development ==
After the deactivation of the successful EF-4C Wild Weasel IV, the contract for the creation of the HTS pod was awarded to Texas Instruments (The defense business of which was sold to Raytheon in 1997 for $2.95 Billion USD).

After the successes of the original design of the HTS pod, future upgraded variants featured vastly improved ranging speed and improved threat identification, as well as improving the frequency covered and the number of targets which could be tracked at once.

In accordance with the Joint Electronics Type Designation System (JETDS), the "AN/ASQ-213" designation represents the 213th design of an Army-Navy airborne electronic device for special combination equipment. The JETDS system also now is used to name all Department of Defense electronic systems.

== See also ==
- List of military electronics of the United States
