= Radar warning receiver =

Warns of radar signals that might be a threat

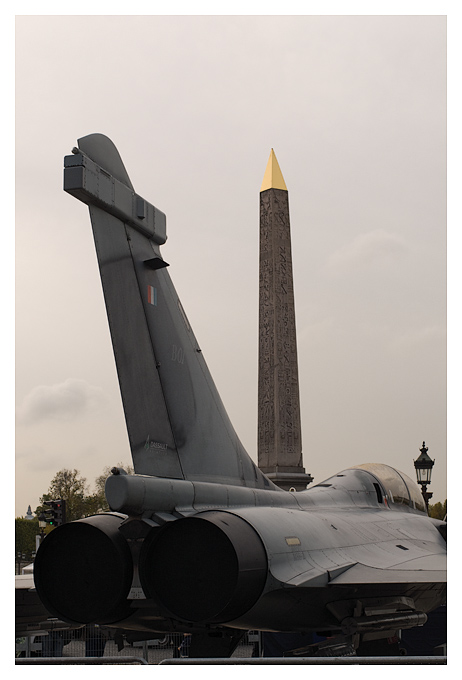
The top end of the aircraft's vertical stabilizer contains a Radar warning receiver, part of the French Dassault Rafale's SPECTRA self defense system

Radar warning receiver (RWR) systems detect the radio emissions of radar systems. Their primary purpose is to issue a warning when a radar signal that might be a threat is detected, like a fighter aircraft's fire control radar. The warning can then be used, manually or automatically, to evade the detected threat. RWR systems can be installed in all kind of airborne, sea-based, and ground-based assets such as aircraft, ships, automobiles, and military bases.

Depending on the market the RWR system is designed for, it can be as simple as detecting the presence of energy in a specific radar band, such as the frequencies of known surface-to-air missile systems. Modern RWR systems are often capable of classifying the source of the radar by the signal's strength, phase and signal details. The information about the signal's strength and waveform can then be used to estimate the type of threat the detected radar poses.

== Description ==
The RWR usually has a visual display somewhere prominent in the cockpit (in some modern aircraft, in multiple locations in the cockpit) and also generates audible tones which feed into the pilot's (and perhaps RIO/co-pilot/GIB's in a multi-seat aircraft) headset. The visual display often takes the form of a circle, with symbols displaying the detected radars according to their direction relative to the current aircraft heading (i.e. a radar straight ahead displayed at the top of the circle, directly behind at the bottom, etc.). The distance from the center of the circle, depending on the type of unit, can represent the estimated distance from the generating radar, or to categorize the severity of threats to the aircraft, with tracking radars placed closer to the center than search radars. The symbol itself is related to the type of radar or the type of vehicle that carries it, often with a distinction made between ground-based radars and airborne radars.

The typical airborne RWR system consists of multiple wideband antennas placed around the aircraft which receive the radar signals. The receiver periodically scans across the frequency band and determines various parameters of the received signals, like frequency, signal shape, direction of arrival, pulse repetition frequency, etc. By using these measurements, the signals are first deinterleaved to sort the mixture of incoming signals by emitter type. These data are then further sorted by threat priority and displayed.

The RWR is used for identifying, avoiding, evading or engaging threats. For example, a fighter aircraft on a combat air patrol (CAP) might notice enemy fighters on the RWR and subsequently use its own radar set to find and eventually engage the threat. In addition, the RWR helps identify and classify threats—it's hard to tell which blips on a radar console-screen are dangerous, but since different fighter aircraft typically have different types of radar sets, once they turn them on and point them near the aircraft in question it may be able to tell, by the direction and strength of the signal, which of the blips is which type of fighter.

A non-combat aircraft, or one attempting to avoid engagements, might turn its own radar off and attempt to steer around threats detected on the RWR. Especially at high altitude (more than 30,000 feet AGL), very few threats exist that don't emit radiation. As long as the pilot is careful to check for aircraft that might try to sneak up without radar, say with the assistance of AWACS or GCI, it should be able to steer clear of SAMs, fighter aircraft and high altitude, radar-directed AAA.

SEAD and ELINT aircraft often have sensitive and sophisticated RWR equipment like the U.S. HTS (HARM targeting system) pod which is able to find and classify threats which are much further away than those detected by a typical RWR, and may be able to overlay threat circles on a map in the aircraft's multi-function display (MFD), providing much better information for avoiding or engaging threats, and may even store information to be analyzed later or transmitted to the ground to help the commanders plan future missions.

The RWR can be an important tool for evading threats if avoidance has failed. For example, if a SAM system or enemy fighter aircraft has fired a missile (for example, a SARH-guided missile) at the aircraft, the RWR may be able to detect the change in mode that the radar must use to guide the missile and notify the pilot with much more insistent warning tones and flashing, bracketed symbols on the RWR display. The pilot then can take evasive action to break the missile lock-on or dodge the missile. The pilot may even be able to visually acquire the missile after being alerted to the possible launch. What's more, if an actively guided missile is tracking the aircraft, the pilot can use the direction and distance display of the RWR to work out which evasive maneuvers to perform to outrun or dodge the missile. For example, the rate of closure and aspect of the incoming missile may allow the pilot to determine that if they dive away from the missile, it is unlikely to catch up, or if it is closing fast, that it is time to jettison external supplies and turn toward the missile in an attempt to out-turn it. The RWR may be able to send a signal to another defensive system on board the aircraft, such as a Countermeasure Dispensing System (CMDS), which can eject countermeasures such as chaff, to aid in avoidance.

== Types in service ==
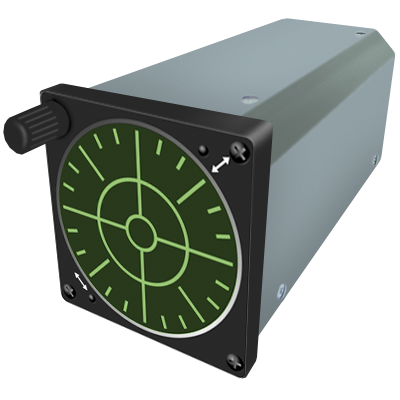
Schematic of a U.S. RWR instrumentation data display panel

=== 1970s ===
- AN/ALR-46 (USA: F-4 Phantom II, RF-4 Phantom II, F-5, B-52 Stratofortress)
- ARI 18223 by Marconi (British aircraft such the Jaguar Mk.1)
- ARI 18228 by Marconi (British F-4 Phantom) – revisions include ARI 18228/13PD "Sky Guardian" and ARI-18228/19 "Sky Guardian 200"
- SPO-15 “Beryoza” (L-006) developed in Russia (India: MiG-29 Fulcrum; Russia: Su-27SK Flanker-B; China: J-11)

=== 1980s ===
- AN/ALR-56 (USA: F-15 Eagle, F-16 Fighting Falcon block 50 and 52; Canada: CC-130 Hercules)
- AN/ALR-64 (USA: F-4 Phantom II, also known as Compass Sail)
- AN/ALR-66 (USA: P-3C Orion, F-5 Tiger)
- AN/ALR-67 (USA: AV-8B Harrier II, F-14 Tomcat, F/A-18 Hornet, F/A-18E/F Super Hornet, EA-6B Prowler; Canada: CF-18 Hornet)
- AN/ALR-69 (USA: B-52H Stratofortress, lacks Frequency Selective Receiver (FSRS) capabilities however, A-10 Thunderbolt II, AC-130 Spectre, F-16 Fighting Falcon, HH-53, MC-130, F-4E Phantom II) – major revision ALR-69A(V) in 2005.
- AN/ALR-73 (USA: E-2C Hawkeye) – revision of AN/ALR-59(V), replaced by Lockheed Martin AN/ALQ-217(V) in Hawkeye 2000.
- AN/ALR-76 (USA: S-3, EP-3); Lockheed Martin revision of Lockheed AN/ALR-47

=== 1990s ===
- AN/APR-39 (USA: AH-1, AH-64 Apache, CH-46 Sea Knight, CH-47 Chinook, CH-53, EH-60 Black Hawk, KC-130 Hercules, MH-47 Chinook, MH-60 Black Hawk, OH-58, OV-1 Mohawk, RC-12, RV-1, UH-1 Iroquois, UH-60 Black Hawk, V-22 Osprey) – last revision AN/APR-39E(V)2 entered production in 2024
- AN/ASQ-213 (USA: F-16 as targeting pod)
- BOW-21 by Deagek (Sweden: JAS 39 Gripen; Germany: Panavia Tornado)
- SkyGuardian 2000 (British EH-101 and WAH-64 Apache; Portuguese EH-101)
- L-150 “Pastel” (Soviet-Russian aircraft)

=== 2000s ===
- AN/ALR-400 by Indra (Spain: EF-18A/B Hornet, Airbus A400M, C-295, CH-47 Chinook, Cougar, TIGER, NH90, CH-53)
- AN/ALR-94 (USA: F-22) by BAE

=== 2020s ===
- AN/ASQ-239 (USA: F-35) – electronic warfare/electronic countermeasures system with RWR ability

=== Date not sorted ===
- Airborne Suite by Elbit (Israel)
- SPS-1000V5 by Elbit (Portugal: F-16 Fighting Falcon, C-295M)
- SPS-45(V)5 by Elbit (Portugal: F-16M Fighting Falcon)
- SPS-65(V)5 by Elbit (Portugal: KC-390 Millennium)
- Tarang by DARE (India: MiG-27 Flogger, LCA Tejas, Jaguar, Su-30MKI Flanker)
- Thales Spectra (France: Dassault Rafale)

== See also ==
- Laser warning receiver
- List of Rainbow Codes
- List of World War II electronic warfare equipment
- List of military electronics of the United States
- Monica tail warning radar
- Semi-active radar homing
- Serrate radar detector
- Missile approach warning
