= AN/ALR-46 =

US military aircraft radar warning receiver

AN/ALR-46 is a radar warning receiver (RWR) that processes received signals from up to 16 hostile radar emitters in the 2–18 GHz (15.0–1.7 cm) frequency range to determine threats to the aircraft. Originally manufactured by Litton Industries and General Instruments, Dalmo-Victor division (now Northrop Grumman), it has been used on several US Air Force aircraft including the A-7D Corsair, B-52 Stratofortress, C-130 Hercules, F-4 Phantom II, F-104 Starfighter, F-105 Thunderchief, F-111 Aardvark and RF-4 Phantom II and others.

== History ==
The first battlefield operational testing of the ALR-46 occurred in August 1972 when a team of Dalmo-Victor and Warner Robins engineers installed the system on F-105G aircraft dubbed "Wild Weasels". Flight testing took place against threats in the Suez Canal area and Egypt. By January 1973, the system had proven reliable and accurate enough to be deployed to an F-105G in Southeast Asia (SEA).

In accordance with the Joint Electronics Type Designation System (JETDS), the "AN/ALR-46" designation represents the 46th design of an Army-Navy electronic device for passive countermeasures signal receiver. The JETDS system also now is used to name all Department of Defense and some NATO electronic systems.

In 1999, the Situational Awareness Defensive Initiative (SADI) program was created to significantly upgrade the ALR-46. The program was valued at $48 million in 2000, and was expected to run through 2003. Improving situational awareness was the "highest priority modification needed for the B-52".

== Technical description ==
=== Features ===
The ALR-46 receiver set allows aircrew to detect the presence of up to 16 threat radars and identify certain characteristics of those radars.

=== Components ===
- 4 Amplifier/Detectors
- Signal processor
- Indicator control
- Azimuth indicator

== See also ==
- AN/ALR-20 – USAF B-52 electronic countermeasures receiver
- AN/ALR-67 – Military aircraft radar warning receiver
- AN/ALQ-218 – US Navy/Marines military aircraft radar warning receiver
- List of military electronics of the United States
- Similar airborne military electronic warfare defense receiver systems
