= AN/ALR-20 =

USAF B-52 electronic countermeasures receiver

AN/ALR-20(A) is an airborne wideband tuned radio frequency receiver providing a panoramic display of the electromagnetic spectrum on US Air Force B-52 Stratofortress aircraft. As a stand-alone system, it is used by the Electronics Warfare Officer (EWO) to evaluate and determine various classifications of threats to the aircraft, identifying various signals including search, acquisition, and tracking radars as well as communications. Because it allows a broad view of the RF spectrum, it provides situational awareness for analysis of the efficacy of defensive jamming techniques employed by the EWO using other systems. First manufactured in the late 1960s, the system is a passive Electronic Support Measures (ESM) tuned radio frequency receiver. It is the primary tool used by the EWO to evaluate threats.

== History ==
First developed in the early 1960s, the ALR-20 began appearing on B-52D bombers (before 1967) and B-52Gs in 1967-1969. In accordance with the Joint Electronics Type Designation System (JETDS), the "AN/ALR-20" designation represents the 20th design of an Army-Navy electronic device for a passive countermeasures signal receiver. The JETDS system is also now used to name US Air Force and some NATO electronics systems.

The ALR-20 did not undergo any significant upgrades or design changes until the 1980s when solid-state components were added to the system's tuners, upgrading older tube-based technology. At the beginning of the 1990s, the outdated panoramic display (using old tube technology) needed replacement due to the existing display becoming unsupportable. But until the late 1990s, the ALR-20's panoramic receiver display continued to utilize cathode ray tube (CRT) technology. This replacement was delivered in the late 1990s. At that time, the tuners and the power supply were determined to also need replacement for the same unsupportable out-dated technology reasons. Today, deployed on B-52H bombers, the system still provides the EWO a display of six different RF bands, allowing for detection and identification of threat signals.

Into the early 2000s, it was determined that the system was "becoming unsupportable due to vanishing vendors and obsolete technology". Under the B-52 Situational Awareness Defensive Improvement (SADI) program, the ALR-20 was expected to be replaced with a defensive system upgrade. The upgrade was expected to create up to thirty-fold improvements in reliability. Efforts to replace the ALR-20 continued into the mid-2000s, while some work was done to continue maintaining line replaceable units (LRUs). In 1999, ninety-one LRU-1s, fifty-four LRU-3s, thirty-six LRU-8s, and eighty-three LRU-9s were repaired at a total cost of over US$315,000 (equivalent to $594,574 in 2024). According to the Air Force's Fiscal Year (FY) 2004/2005 budget estimates, SADI would cost just over US$70,900,000 (equivalent to $118,029,264 in 2024).

Electronic Warfare Officers undergo extensive training concerning the ALR-20 panoramic system.

== Technical description ==
=== Features ===
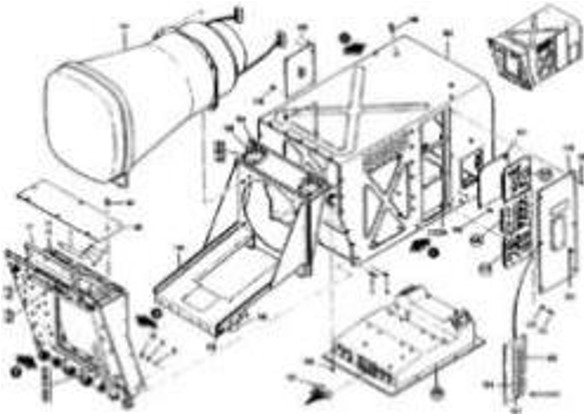
AN/ALR20A Panoramic Display - Illustrated Parts Breakdown

The ALR-20's panoramic display is the EWO's primary source for analysis of potential threats through a very wide part of the electromagnetic spectrum. The early CRT for the display (seen in the image to the right) had an orange tint displaying six different horizontal lines, or traces, representing six discrete frequency bands. All the tuners together cover frequencies from 2–18 GHz (15.0–1.7 cm) simultaneously, encompassing S-, C-, X- and K_{u}-band radar emissions. The signals displayed on those lines may be quickly analyzed by frequency, signal strength and modulation characteristics. Analyzing and understanding those characteristics allows the EWO to employ the proper electronic countermeasures for multiple different threats at once.

=== Components ===
- Receiving set controller: LRU-1, allows the EWO to select bands, adjust gain (sensitivity) and calibrate the display. Modified in the late-1990s to upgrade technology, possibly replacing the CRT monitor
- Panoramic display: LRU-2, also called Panoramic Indicator, displays six traces representing different scanned RF bands at once, presenting the EWO with signal characteristics for analysis
- Power supply: LRU-3, provides regulated voltages for system LRUs
- Radio frequency tuners: Modules A–F, each one receiving a distinct subset of frequency ranges. Early versions used vacuum tube technology, but were later replaced by solid-state devices
- Calibration Oscillator: Generates a reference tone to help calibrate frequency accuracy and system sensitivity inflight

== Variants ==
- AN/ALR-20
- AN/ALR-20A

== See also ==
- AN/ALR-67 – Military aircraft radar warning receiver
- AN/ALQ-218 – US Navy/Marines military aircraft radar warning receiver
- List of military electronics of the United States
- Similar US military defensive receiver systems
