= Boeing EA-18G Growler =

American electronic warfare aircraft

EA-18G Growler
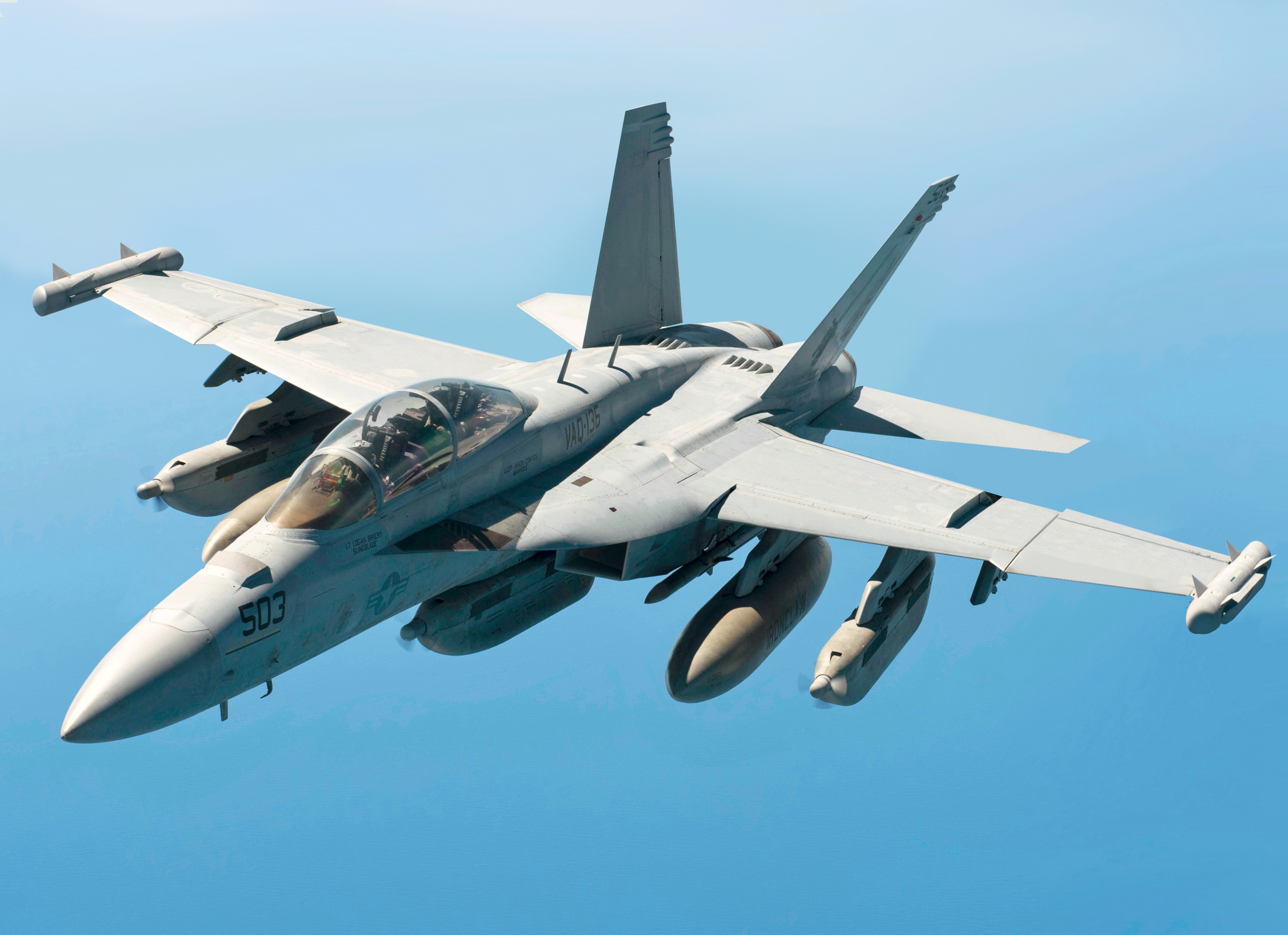
- A US Navy EA-18G in flight over the Pacific Ocean

General information
- Type: Carrier-based electronic-warfare aircraft
- National origin: United States
- Manufacturer: Boeing
- Status: In service
- Primary users: United States Navy Royal Australian Air Force
- Number built: 172 as of October 2021

History
- Manufactured: 2004–2019
- Introduction date: 22 September 2009
- First flight: 15 August 2006
- Developed from: Boeing F/A-18F Super Hornet

The Boeing EA-18G Growler is an American carrier-based electronic-warfare aircraft, a specialized version of the two-seat Boeing F/A-18F Super Hornet. The EA-18G replaced the Northrop Grumman EA-6B Prowlers in service with the United States Navy. The Growler's electronic-warfare capability is primarily provided by Northrop Grumman. The EA-18G began production in 2007 and entered operational service with the US Navy in late 2009. Australia has also purchased 13 EA-18Gs, which entered service with the Royal Australian Air Force in 2017.

== Development ==
=== Requirement and testing ===
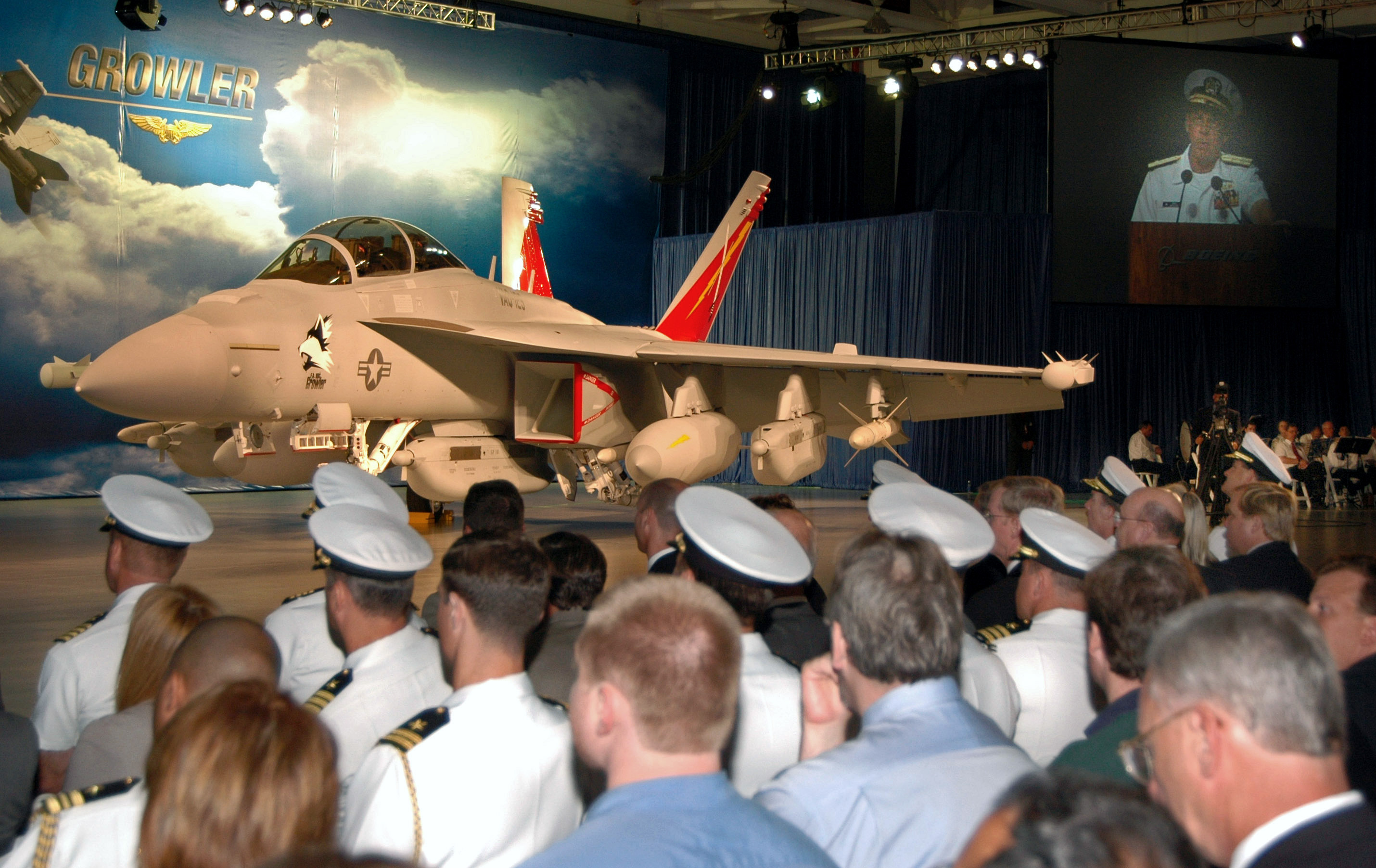
The first EA-18G at the roll-out ceremony on 3 August 2006

On 15 November 2001, Boeing successfully completed an initial flight demonstration of F/A-18F "F-1" fitted with the ALQ-99 electronic-warfare system to serve as the EA-18 airborne electronic attack (AEA) concept aircraft. In December 2003, the US Navy awarded a development contract for the EA-18G to Boeing. As primary contractor, Boeing was to construct the forward fuselage and wings and perform the final assembly. Northrop Grumman was the principal airframe subcontractor and would supply the center and aft fuselage, as well as the principal electronic combat system. In 2003, the Navy expected to receive 90 EA-18Gs.

The first EA-18G test aircraft entered production on 22 October 2004. The first test aircraft, known as EA-1, was rolled out on 3 August 2006, before making its maiden flight at St. Louis on 15 August 2006; it was later ferried to Naval Air Station Patuxent River, Maryland, on 22 September 2006. EA-1 primarily supports ground testing in the Air Combat Environment Test and Evaluation Facility anechoic chamber.

The second aircraft (EA-2) first flew on 10 November 2006, and was delivered to NAS Patuxent River on 29 November 2006. EA-2 is an AEA flight-test aircraft, initially flying on Pax River's Atlantic Test Range (ATR) for developmental test of the AEA system before transitioning to the Electronic Combat Range (ECR or Echo Range) in Naval Air Weapons Station China Lake in California. Both aircraft are assigned to VX-23 "Salty Dogs". EA-1 and EA-2 are F/A-18Fs - F-134 and F-135 - pulled from the St. Louis production line and modified by Boeing to the EA-18G configuration. Since they were not built initially as Growlers, though, the Navy has designated these two test aircraft as NEA-18Gs. Five Growlers were flying in the flight-test program as of June 2008.

=== Procurement ===
In an April 2006 report, the US Government Accountability Office (GAO) expressed a concern - the electronic-warfare systems on the EA-18G were not fully mature, so a risk existed of "future cost growth and schedule delays". The report recommended that the U.S. Department of Defense (DoD) consider purchasing additional ICAP III upgrades for EA-6Bs to fill any current and near-term capability gaps and restructure the initial EA-18G production plans so that procurement takes place after the aircraft has "demonstrated full functionality". In a 2008 GAO report, the director of the DoD's Operational Test and Evaluation department questioned the workload on the two-person Growler crew to replace the Prowler's crew of four.

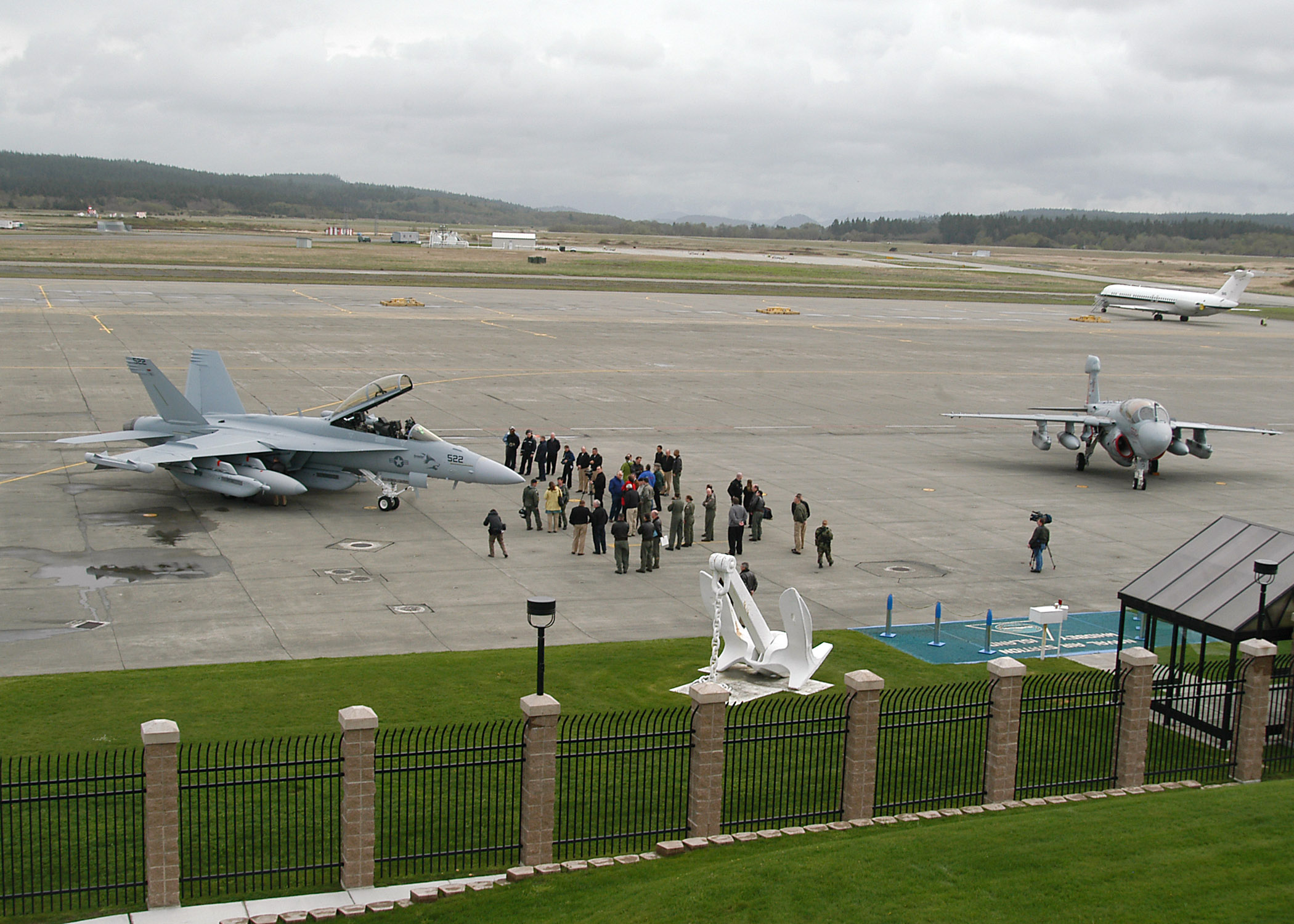
An EA-18G Growler alongside an EA-6B Prowler shortly after arriving at NAS Whidbey Island, 2007

The U.S. Navy has ordered a total of 57 aircraft to replace its in-service EA-6B Prowlers, most of which are based at NAS Whidbey Island. The US DoD gave approval for the EA-18G program to begin low-rate initial production in 2007. The EA-18G was scheduled to finish flight testing in 2008. The Navy planned to buy approximately 85 aircraft in 2008. Approval for full-rate production was expected in the third quarter of 2009, and was given on 23 November 2009. Boeing planned to ramp up production to 20 aircraft per year. On 9 July 2009, General James Cartwright told the Senate Armed Services Committee that the choice had been to continue the F/A-18 production line because the warfighting commanders needed more aerial electronic-warfare capability that only the EA-18G could provide.

The Navy's submission for the 2011 defense budget put forth by the Obama administration called for four EA-18G Growler squadrons to be added to the fleet. On 14 May 2010, Boeing and the DoD reached an agreement for a multiyear contract for an additional 66 F/A-18E/Fs and 58 EA-18Gs over the next four years. This would raise the total to 114 EA-18Gs on order.

The Pentagon's Director of Operational Test and Evaluation determined that the EA-18G was "still not operationally suitable" in February 2011. Prime contractor Boeing was working to address issues with software updates. In December 2011, Operational Test and Evaluation concluded that the EA-18G software was "operationally effective and suitable".

On 19 December 2014, the Navy publicly reported that it wanted to modify the production contract with Boeing to slow production of the Growler from three airplanes per month to two. It would also purchase an additional 15 Growlers, funded by a spending bill that went to President Obama for signature in late December 2014. Boeing would then be able to continue running the St. Louis production line through 2017. Boeing has said it cannot sustain the production line at fewer than two airplanes per month.

== Design ==
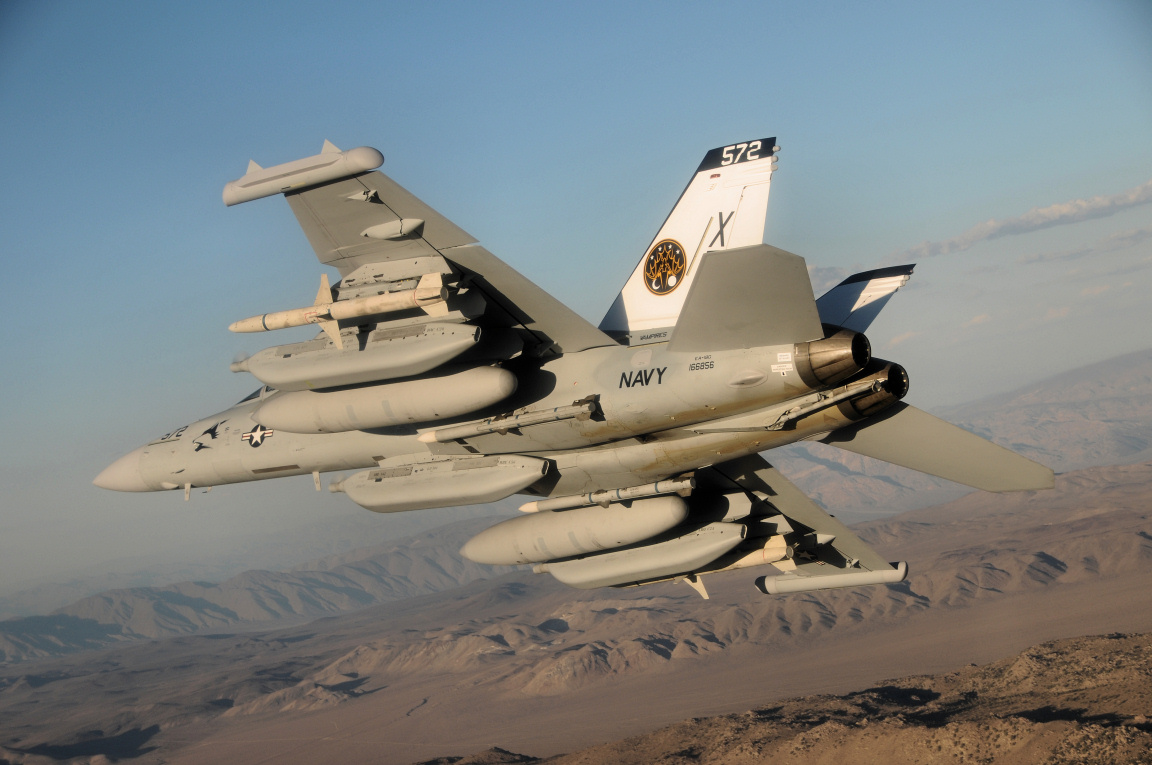
An EA-18G Growler of test and evaluation squadron VX-9 is carrying external fuel tanks, jamming pods, and AGM-88 HARM and AIM-120 AMRAAM missiles.

The Growler's flight performance is similar to that of the F/A-18E/F. This attribute enables it to perform escort jamming, as well as the traditional standoff jamming mission (radar jamming and deception). Growlers are able to accompany F/A-18s during all phases of an attack mission. To give the Growler more stable flight for the electronic-warfare mission, Boeing changed the leading-edge fairings and wing-fold hinge fairings, and added wing fences and aileron "tripper strips".

The Growler has more than 90% in common with the standard Super Hornet, sharing airframe, Raytheon AN/APG-79 AESA radar, and weapon systems such as the AN/AYK-22 stores management system. Most of the dedicated airborne electronic-attack equipment is mounted on a plate in the space that once housed the internal 20 mm cannon and on the wingtips. Nine weapons stations remain free to provide for additional weapons or jamming pods. The added electronics include AN/ALQ-218 wideband receivers on the wingtips and ALQ-99 high- and low-band tactical jamming pods. The ALQ-218 combined with the ALQ-99 form a full-spectrum electronic-warfare suite that is able to provide detection and jamming against all known surface-to-air threats. However, the current pods may be inadequate against emerging threats.

The EA-18G can be fitted with up to five ALQ-99 jamming pods and typically can add two AIM-120 AMRAAM or AGM-88 HARM missiles. The EA-18G also uses the INCANS interference cancellation system that allows voice communication while jamming enemy communications, a capability not available on the EA-6B. In addition to the radar warning and jamming equipment, the Growler possesses a communications receiver and jamming system that provides suppression and electronic attack against airborne communication threats.

The poor reliability of the ALQ-99 jammer pod and frequent failures of the built-in test have caused the crew to fly missions with undetected faults. The ALQ-99 has also interfered with the aircraft's active electronically scanned array (AESA) radar and has imposed a high workload on the two-man crew, along with reducing the Growler's top speed.

Boeing is looking into other potential upgrades; the ALQ-99 radar jamming pod may be replaced in the future, and the company is looking into adding weapons and replacing the satellite-communications receiver. The Growler is the initial platform for the Next Generation Jammer (NGJ), which uses AESA technology to focus jamming power exactly where needed. The NGJ was to be implemented on the F-35. However, in May 2012, the U.S. Navy decided to focus NGJ integration on the EA-18G for an expected in-service date of 2020, and defer work for the F-35. Boeing is also looking at exporting a Growler Lite configuration without the jamming pods for electronic awareness rather than electronic attack.

Three Growlers networked together can generate targeting tracks for hostile radio-frequency sources in real time, but this is difficult to arrange with the current minimum-strength US Navy squadrons. Using faster datalinks, the Growler could use its electronic warfare pods to accurately locate signal sources. In a group of three planes, when one detects a signal from a source such as a cell phone, the other two can also listen for the same signal, all three measuring the time taken for transmissions to travel from the source to each aircraft to triangulate the location to "a very, very small area." By early 2015, the Navy had demonstrated this concept using EA-18s equipped with Rockwell Collins' tactical targeting network technology (TTNT) and ALQ-218 receivers to acquire emissions from a target vessel and target it from a stand-off range without using their own detectable radar emissions. Boeing announced on 1 December 2015 that it would upgrade Navy EA-18Gs with the TTNT datalink.

Following U.S. Navy missions in Operation Odyssey Dawn during the 2011 Libyan Revolution, the Royal Australian Air Force decided to add the Raytheon forward looking infrared (FLIR) pod to their order of 12 Growler aircraft. When the Navy's EA-18Gs' radar and radar detectors located possible targets, they passed the information through datalinks to strike fighters. However, the Growlers themselves lacked the ability to visually confirm what they had detected, so adding a FLIR pod gives them visual acuity to see targets and shorten the kill chain; whether the U.S. Navy will also add a FLIR pod is unknown. Australian EA-18Gs will also be equipped with the AIM-9X Sidewinder missile.

== Operational history ==
=== United States ===
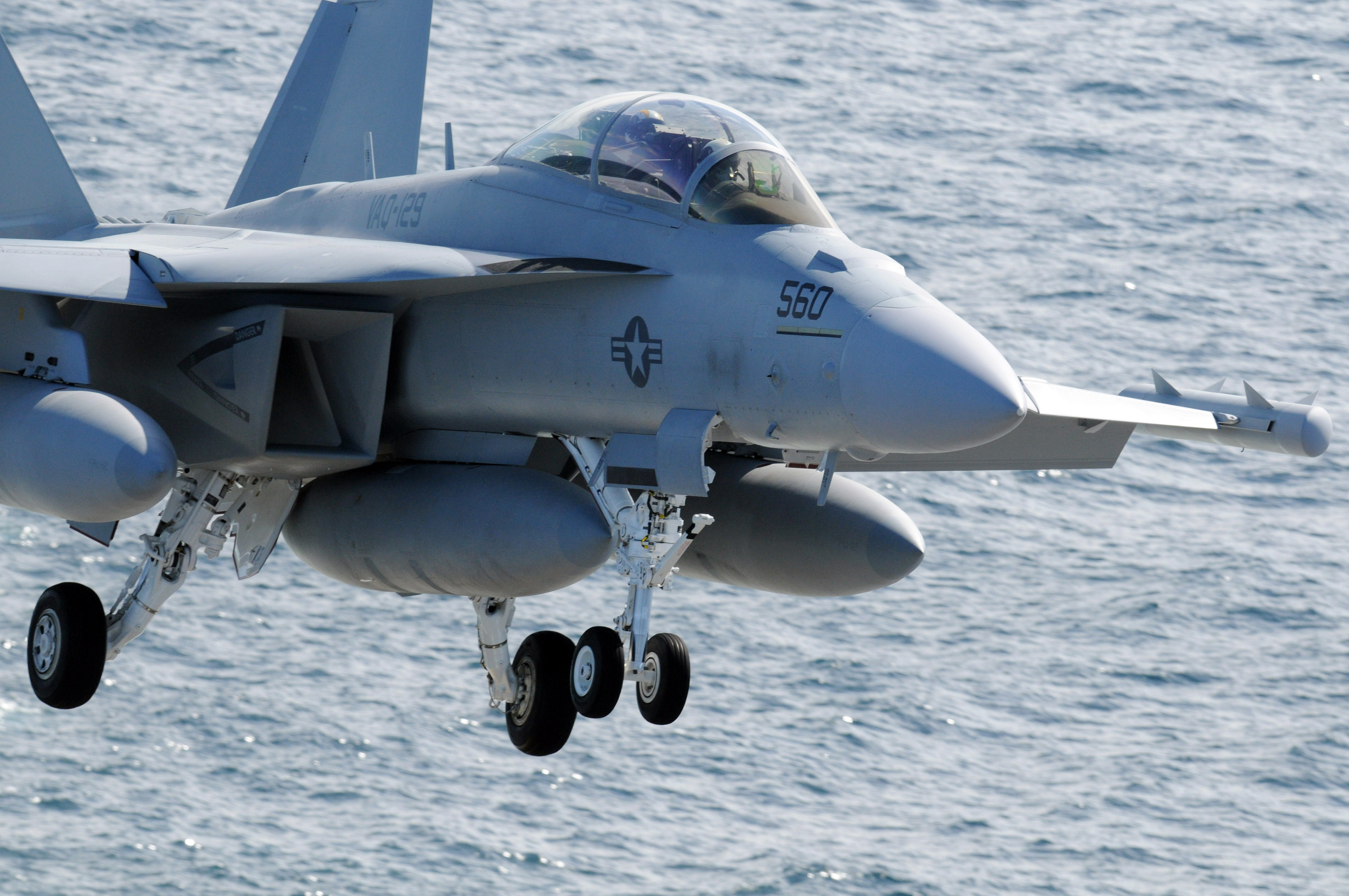
An EA-18G of VAQ-129 "Vikings" aligns itself for an at-sea landing aboard USS Ronald Reagan

The first Growler for fleet use was officially accepted by VAQ-129 "Vikings" at NAS Whidbey Island on 3 June 2008. The Navy planned to buy about 85 aircraft to equip 11 squadrons as of 2008. The EA-18G completed operational evaluation in late July 2009. The Growler was rated operationally effective and suitable for operational use. On 5 August 2009, EA-18G Growlers from Electronic Attack Squadron 129 and Electronic Attack Squadron 132 (VAQ-132) completed their first at-sea carrier-arrested landing aboard USS Harry S. Truman (CVN-75).

The first deployable EA-18G squadron was VAQ-132 "Scorpions", which reached operational status in October 2009. The first Growler operational deployment was announced on 17 February 2011. In service, the EA-18's radio name during flight operations would be "Grizzly". The "Growler" nickname sounded too much like the EA-6B's "Prowler" name, so "Grizzly"is used to avoid confusion. By May 2011, 48 Growlers had been delivered to the U.S. Navy.

With the termination of the EB-52H standoff jammer, the Growler became the sole remaining crewed tactical jammer. Air Staff requirements director Maj. Gen. David Scott has indicated that the USAF will seek to provide electronic-warfare officers to fly on U.S. Navy Growlers, without providing funding to purchase additional aircraft. USAF personnel of 390th Electronic Combat Squadron stationed at NAS Whidbey Island have been supporting and flying the Growler.

The EA-18G was first used in combat during Operation Odyssey Dawn, enforcing the UN no-fly zone over Libya in 2011. Five EA-18Gs were redeployed from Iraq to support operations in Libya in 2011.

The Growler was deployed as part of Operation Prosperity Guardian, where one destroyed a Houthi Mil Mi-24 "Hind" on the ground with an AGM-88E Advanced Antiradiation Guided Missile. The EA-18G also scored its first air-to-air kill, downing a Houthi drone.

In late 2024, E/A-18Gs of VAQ-133 attached to the USS Abraham Lincoln (CVN-72) successfully used the ALQ-249 NGJ and made the squadron the first in the Navy to deploy with the new jamming pod.

In 2026, Operation Absolute Resolve involved EA-18Gs likely deployed from the Gerald Ford as part of Electronic Attack Squadron 142, though around the time of the operation, VAQ-132 was also forward deployed at Naval Station Roosevelt Roads, in Puerto Rico.

=== Australia ===
In 2008, the Australian government requested export approval from the US government to purchase up to six EA-18Gs, which would be part of the order for 24 F/A-18F Super Hornets.

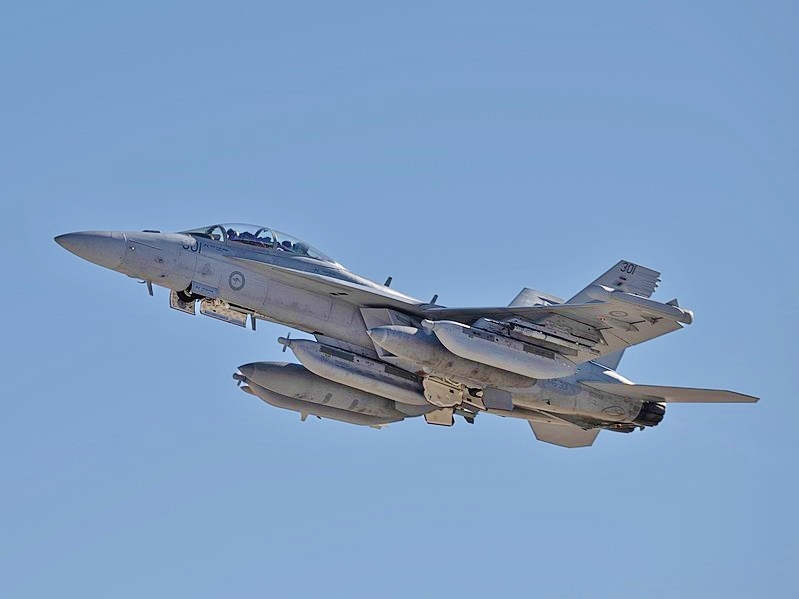
An Australian EA-18G in 2023

On 27 February 2009, Defence Minister Joel Fitzgibbon announced that 12 of the 24 Super Hornets on order would be wired on the production line for future fit-out as EA-18Gs. The additional wiring would cost A$35 million. On 23 August 2012, the Australian government announced that 12 Royal Australian Air Force (RAAF) Super Hornets would be fitted with Growler capability at a cost of $1.5 billion, making the RAAF the only military other than the U.S. to operate the Growler's electronic-jamming equipment.

On 3 May 2013, the Australian government announced that it would buy 12 new-build Growlers to supplement its existing Super Hornet fleet. Australia took delivery of the first of 12 Growlers on 29 July 2015. Uniquely, Australian Growlers were to be equipped with the AN/ASQ-228 ATFLIR targeting pod and will also have additional air-to-air weapons in the form of the AIM-9X missile. The aircraft are to be operated by No. 6 Squadron RAAF. On 7 July 2017, the RAAF completed delivery of the 12 EA-18G Growlers, with the arrival of the last Growler at RAAF Base Amberley, home of No. 6 Squadron RAAF.

One of the Australian EA-18Gs was written off following an engine fire in January 2018, leaving the force with 11 of the type. On 29 January, an Australian EA-18G caught fire after an aborted takeoff at Nellis Air Force Base, Nevada, while participating in Exercise Red Flag 2018. The crew were able to exit the jet on the ground unharmed. An investigation found that one engine's high-pressure compressor had broken into three major pieces that severely damaged the lower airframe, right tailfin, and the other engine. The aircraft was written off on 15 August and the Australian government is attempting to claim compensation for the loss of the A$125 million aircraft.

On 9 December 2020, the AAF announced that the 11 EA-18G Growlers and 24 F/A-18F Super Hornets had been grounded after an incident occurred where the crew of an RAAF F/A-18F had to eject on takeoff.

On 30 September 2021, the US State Department approved the sale of an EA-18G to Australia to replace the one lost in the 2018 accident. This aircraft was ordered in early 2022, with the price being up to US$125 million. It was acquired from the US Navy's stock of Growlers and modified to the same configuration as the other Australian aircraft before being delivered to the RAAF. The aircraft was delivered to the RAAF in February 2023.

In February 2023, a A$2 billion project to upgrade the RAAF's Growlers and support infrastructure was approved and awarded to Boeing. As part of the project, new radar infrastructure was to be installed at RAAF Base Amberley and the Delamere Air Weapons Range. The Growlers would also be fitted with improved sensors, longer-range missiles, and new jamming pods.

=== Potential operators ===
==== Japan ====
On 1 January 2018, the Japanese government reportedly was considering purchasing an electronic-warfare attack aircraft and the EA-18G was a candidate for the Japan Air Self-Defense Force.

=== Failed bids ===
==== Finland ====
Boeing and the US Navy indicated their intention to propose the F/A-18E/F and EA-18G as a package for the new fighter introduction program, HX, which would replace the F/A-18C/D fighters operated by the Finnish Air Force, and on 18 February 2019, the US DoD approved the export of the EA-18G to Finland. However, the Finnish Air Force selected the F-35 Lightning II in February 2022.

== Operators ==
Australia

- Royal Australian Air Force - 12 aircraft in service
  - No. 6 Squadron RAAF

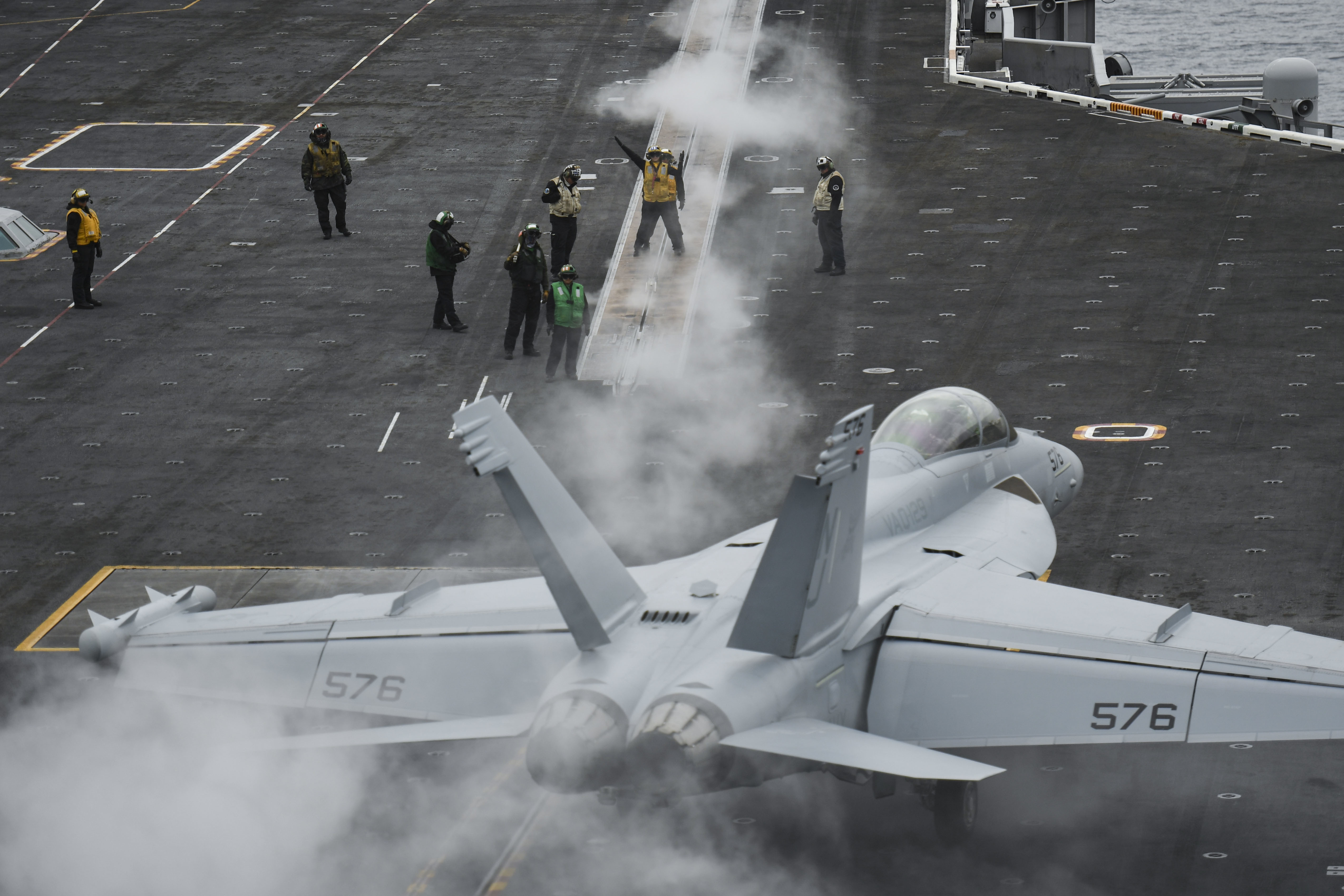
An EA-18G prepares to launch from the aircraft carrier USS Theodore Roosevelt (CVN-71)

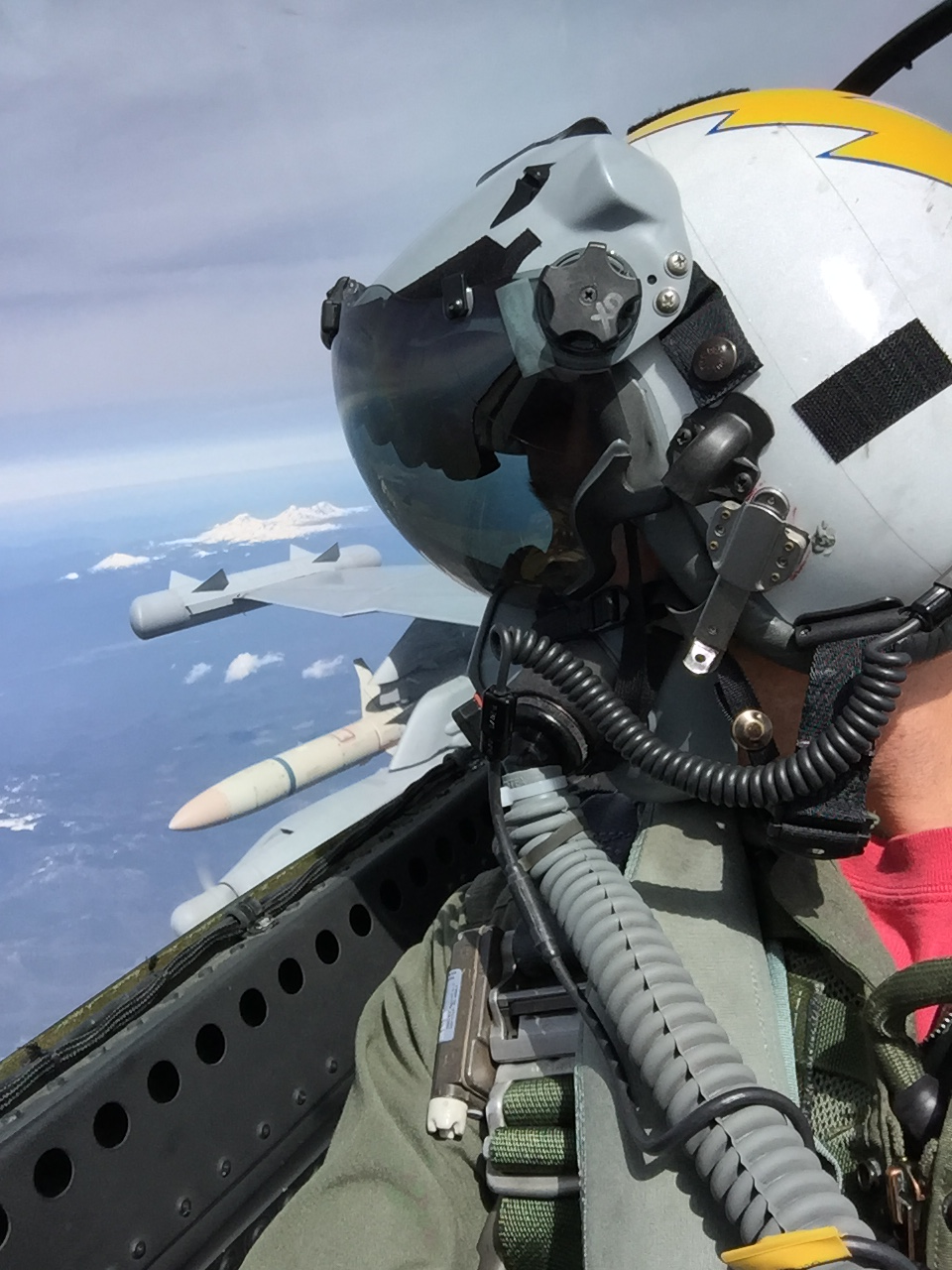
An EA-18G pilot checks his right wing stores

United States

- United States Air Force
  - 390th Electronic Combat Squadron provides training for electronic warfare officers for Navy units by augmenting VAQ-129 with some USAF instructors.
- United States Navy - 153 aircraft in service
  - VAQ-129
  - VAQ-130
  - VAQ-131
  - VAQ-132
  - VAQ-133
  - VAQ-134
  - VAQ-135
  - VAQ-136
  - VAQ-137
  - VAQ-138
  - VAQ-139
  - VAQ-140
  - VAQ-141
  - VAQ-142
  - VAQ-144
  - VAQ-209
  - VX-9
  - VX-23
  - VX-31
  - Naval Aviation Warfighting Development Center

== Notable accidents ==
- On 15 October 2024, a single EA-18G on a low-level training mission near Mount Rainier, Washington, US, struck the ground, killing both officers on board. The official report on the incident has yet to be released by the U.S. Navy.
- On 12 February 2025, a single EA-18G, on a training mission near San Diego, California, US, crashed during landing. Both crew ejected from the aircraft into San Diego Bay and were rescued by a nearby fishing vessel. A US Navy investigation determined the mishap was caused by human error.
- On 17 May 2026, two EA-18Gs collided during an air show at Mountain Home AFB, Idaho, US. All four crew members ejected safely, while the planes crashed.
- On 28 September 2026, four personnel were injured in a landing mishap aboard USS Eisenhower.

== Specifications (EA-18G Growler) ==
Data from Boeing brochure and U.S. Navy F/A-18E/F fact file.

General characteristics

- Crew: 2
- Length: 60 ft 1.25 in (18.31 m)
- Wingspan: 44 ft 8.5 in (13.62 m) (including wingtip-mounted pods)
- Height: 16 ft 0 in (4.88 m)
- Wing area: 500 sq ft (46.5 m^{2})
- Empty weight: 33,094 lb (15,011 kg)
- Gross weight: 48,000 lb (21,772 kg) ; recovery weight
- Max takeoff weight: 66,000 lb (29,964 kg)
- Internal fuel capacity: 13,940 lb (6,323 kg)
- External fuel capacity: (3 x 480 gal (1,800 L) tanks), 9,774 lb (4,420 kg)
- Powerplant: 2 × General Electric F414-GE-400 turbofans, 14,000 lbf (62 kN) thrust each dry, 22,000 lbf (98 kN) with afterburner

Performance

- Maximum speed: 1,030 kn (1,190 mph, 1,900 km/h) at 40,000 ft (12,190 m)
- Maximum speed: Mach 1.8
- Range: 1,275 nmi (1,458 mi, 2,346 km) ; clean plus two AIM-9s
- Combat range: 390 nmi (449 mi, 722 km) ; for interdiction mission
- Ferry range: 1,800 nmi (2,070 mi, 3,330 km) ; range without ordnance
- Service ceiling: 50,000 ft (15,000 m) at least
- Wing loading: 92.8 lb/sq ft (453 kg/m^{2})
- Thrust/weight: 0.93

Armament

- Guns: None
- Hardpoints: 9 total: 6 under-wing and 3 under-fuselage with a capacity of 17,750 lb (8,050 kg) external fuel and ordnance
- Notes: The two wingtip missile launcher rails for AIM-9 Sidewinder, found on the E/F Super Hornet, have been replaced with AN/ALQ-218 detection pods, six removable under wing mounted hard points (inboard pylons will carry 480 gal (1,800 L) fuel tanks, mid-board pylons will carry AN/ALQ-99 High Band Jamming Pods, and outboard pylon reserved for AGM-88 HARM missiles), two multi-mode conformal fuselage stations (AIM-120 AMRAAM missiles), 1 centerline fuselage removable hardpoint, for AN/ALQ-99 Low Band Jamming Pod.
  - Weapons employment: Currently, Phase I of the Growler will carry the AIM-120 AMRAAM missiles for self-protection at the two conformal fuselage stations and AGM-88 HARM missiles. The A/A-49A-2 gun system with the 20 mm M61A2 cannon has been removed and replaced by a pod of electronic boxes that control the AN/ALQ-218 and assist with coordinating AN/ALQ-99 jamming attacks.
  - According to the possible weapon configurations which were revealed, EA-18G would also be capable of performing "time-sensitive" strike missions, carrying AGM-154 JSOW under wings, or multi-sensor reconnaissance missions with SHARP and AN/ASQ-228 ATFLIR on centerline and left conformal weapon stations, respectively.

Avionics

- Raytheon AN/APG-79 Active electronically scanned array (AESA) radar
- Northrop Grumman AN/ALQ-218 Tactical Jamming System Receiver
- EDO Corporation AN/ALQ-99 Airborne Integrated Jamming System

== See also ==
Related development

- McDonnell Douglas F/A-18 Hornet
- Boeing F/A-18E/F Super Hornet

Aircraft of comparable role, configuration, and era

- Shenyang J-15D
- Shenyang J-16D

Related lists

- List of active United States military aircraft
- List of fighter aircraft
- List of military electronics of the United States
