= Modex =

US Navy aircraft identification marking

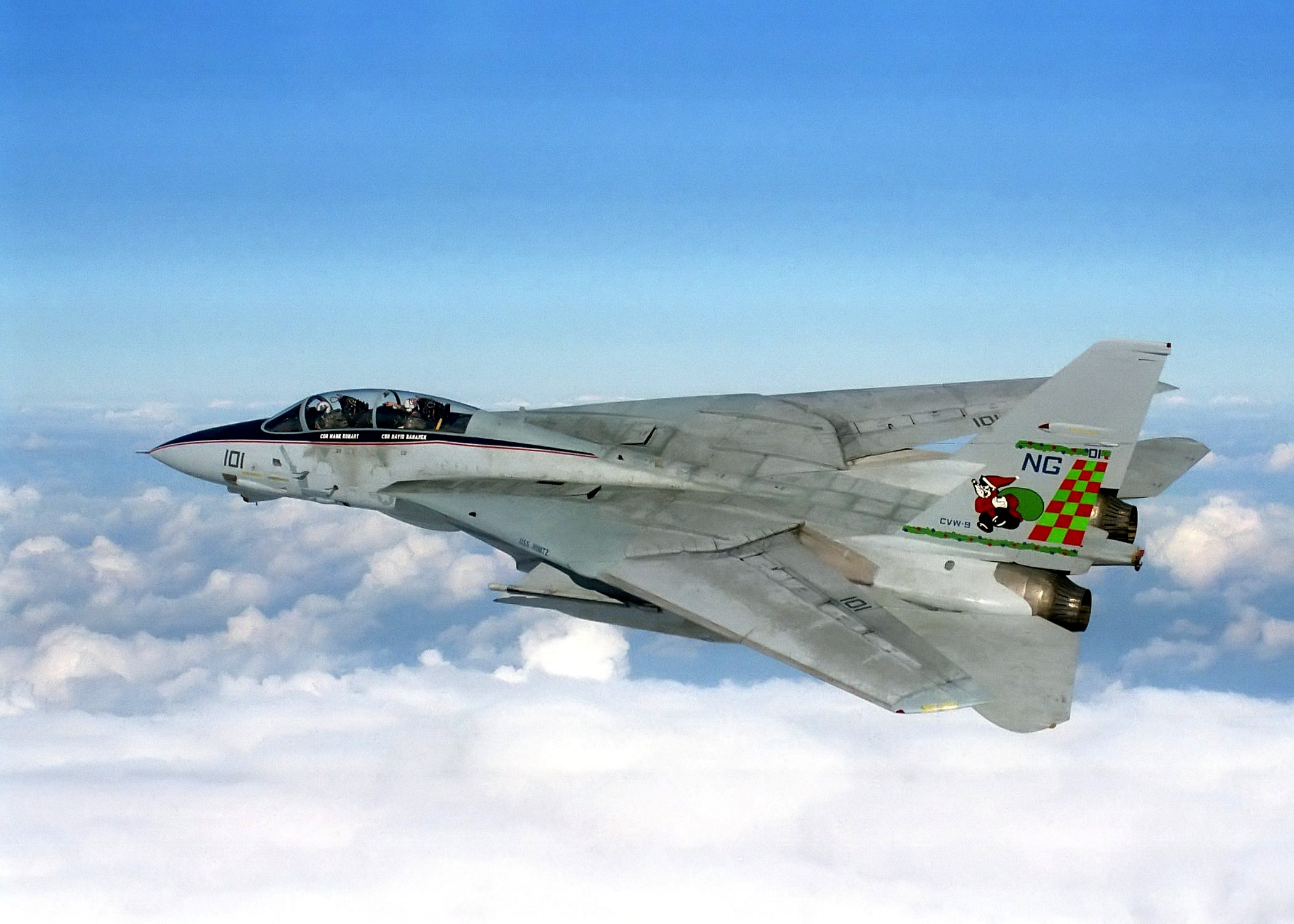
An F-14 Tomcat with a commanding officer's modex of 101 on the nose, fin tip, and the top of the flaps.

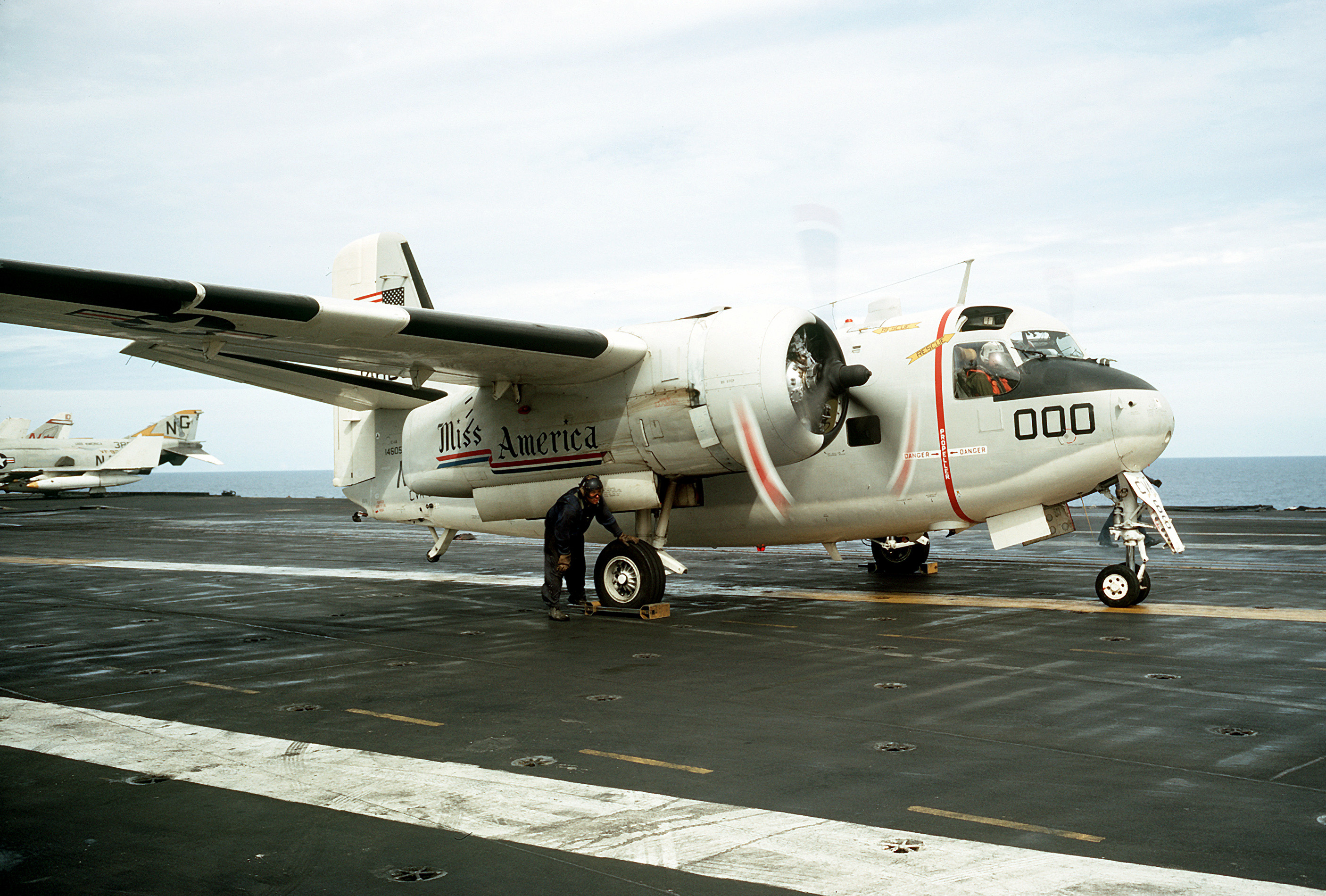
A C-1 Trader displaying 000 (aka "triple nuts") on the nose.

A modex is a number that is part of the Aircraft Visual Identification System, along with the aircraft's tail code. It usually consists of two or three numbers that the Department of the Navy, U.S. Navy and U.S. Marine Corps use on aircraft to identify a squadron's mission and a specific aircraft within a squadron. These numbers are painted conspicuously on the aircraft's nose—or, on helicopters, sometimes on the aft portion of the fuselage or forward portion of the empennage. Modexes are also painted less conspicuously on other aircraft areas (i.e., fin tip, flaps, etc.). Shore-based aviation units use either two-digit or three-digit modexes, while carrier-based units always use three digits.

In a carrier air wing (CVW), the first digit of a modex number indicates the squadron an individual aircraft is assigned to in the CVW. Modex numbers in the 1xx and 2xx series are assigned to the CVW's Super Hornet Strike Fighter Squadrons (VFA), which fly either the F/A-18E or F/A-18F Super Hornet. Modex numbers in the 3xx and 4xx series are assigned to the CVW's remaining two VFA squadrons (or, if a Marine Corps squadron is assigned, VMFA), which fly the F/A-18C Hornet. As more USN F/A-18C Hornet squadrons transition to the F/A-18E or F Super Hornet those 3xx and 4xx modexes may also belong to VFA squadrons flying the Super Hornet. All CVWs have four VFA squadrons or three VFA and one VMFA. Some are all Super Hornet E or F squadrons and some are a mix of Hornet C model squadrons and Super Hornet E or F model squadrons.

5xx side numbers are assigned to the Electronic Attack (VAQ) squadron flying the EA-18G Growler.

6xx side numbers are assigned to the Airborne Early Warning (VAW) squadron (600-607) flying the E-2C (currently transitioning to the E-2D) Hawkeye, and the Helicopter Sea Combat (HSC) squadron (610 and higher) flying the MH-60S Seahawk helicopter.

7xx modexes are assigned to the Helicopter Maritime Strike (HSM) squadron flying the MH-60R Seahawk helicopter, 3–5 of which are typically based in detachments on other ships of the carrier strike group.

Units that flew the C-2 Greyhound and other cargo planes often had either 2-digit modexes (no prefix) or 0xx modexes (see image on the right).

The last two digits identify an individual aircraft within a squadron, with the aircraft numbered sequentially from x00 (or 610 in the case of the HSC squadron) up to the number of aircraft in that squadron with the number x13 often skipped. Some squadrons may skip numbers other than x13 if past mishaps resulted in the loss of an aircraft or crew with that number. Each squadron typically designates the aircraft with the modex number of x00 (i.e., 100, 200, etc.) as the CVW commander's (CAG's) aircraft (called the CAG bird) and paint its tail with squadron colors rather than with the subdued grey tone colors of the rest of the squadron's aircraft. Aircraft with a modex of x01 (i.e., 101, 201, 701 etc.) generally carry the name of that squadron's commanding officer and those with a modex of x02 (e.g., 102, 202, 702, etc.) generally carry the name of the squadron's executive officer.

Marine aircraft are typically shore-based and use a two-digit modex. If USMC aircraft are assigned to a carrier air wing they employ the three-digit system used by the rest of the carrier airwing.

Land-based naval transport aircraft (VR) may use three-digit modex numbers but use of the last three digits of the aircraft's bureau number (BUNO) is also not uncommon. Carrier onboard delivery aircraft (VRC) also used BUNO-derived side numbers, but occasionally use the aircraft carrier's number (for example, 68 for an aircraft assigned to USS Nimitz: CVN-68).

Land-based patrol aircraft (VP) previously used a two-digit modex number until the mid-1990s when they transitioned to three digit modexes using the last three digits of the aircraft's Bureau Number (BuNo).

== Background ==
From the 1980s through the first decade of the 21st century, the 1xx and 2xx modexes identified the CVW's fighter (VF) squadrons flying the F-4 Phantom II or the F-14 Tomcat. The 3xx and 4xx modexes initially identified the CVW's light attack (VA) squadrons flying the A-7 Corsair II or the F/A-18 Hornet. The A-7 was replaced beginning in the mid 1980s with the F/A-18A and later C Hornet. When the VA squadrons transitioned to the F/A-18 they were re-designated Strike Fighter (VFA) squadrons and retained their old VA squadron 3xx and 4xx modexes. At that point 1xx and 2xx modexes identified VF squadrons and 3xx and 4xx modexes identified VFA (formerly VA) squadrons. The 5xx numbers belonged to the CVW's medium attack squadron (VA) flying the A-6 Intruder. The 6xx modexes were shared by the CVW's Airborne Early Warning (VAW) squadron flying the E-2C Hawkeye (600-604), the Electronic Attack (VAQ) squadron flying the EA-6B Prowler (605-609), and the Helicopter Anti-Submarine Squadron (HS) flying first the SH-3H Sea King and by the end of the 90s the SH-60F and HH-60H Seahawk helicopter (610 and higher). Those squadrons (VAW, VAQ, HS) were relatively small with only four (VAW and VAQ) or six to eight (HS) aircraft assigned as opposed to the other CVW squadrons each with 10 or more aircraft assigned. The 7xx modexes belonged to the Air Anti-Submarine (later Sea Control) (VS) squadron flying the S-3 Viking. With the retirement of the A-6 Intruder in the late 90s the 5xx modex was unused and the Electronic Attack (VAQ) EA-6B Prowler squadrons adopted it, leaving only the VAW and HS squadrons sharing the 6xx numbers.

By mid-2006 the F-14 Tomcat had been replaced by the F/A-18E and F Super Hornet, and VF squadrons were re-designated VFA squadrons. Once the VF squadrons transitioned to VFA, all 1xx, 2xx, 3xx, and 4xx modexes belonged to the CVW's four VFA squadrons—both those that had been VF squadrons (1xx and 2xx) and those that had been VA (3xx and 4xx) squadrons. Additionally the VS squadrons were disestablished or deactivated and the S-3 Viking retired. The aircraft that ultimately assumed the S-3's former Sea Control role is the MH-60R Seahawk helicopter of the Helicopter Maritime Strike (HSM) squadrons. As such, those HSM squadrons now use the 7xx modexes. The Electronic Attack (VAQ) squadrons, now flying the EA-18G Growler retain the 5xx modexes that they assumed from the old VA A-6 Intruder squadrons when they still flew the EA-6B Prowler. The VAW squadrons retain the lower 6xx numbers (now 600-609). The Helicopter Anti-Submarine Squadrons (HS) have all transitioned from the SH-60F and HH-60H Seahawks to the MH-60S Seahawk and have been re-designated Helicopter Sea Combat (HSC) squadrons. Those HSC squadrons retain their former HS squadron 6xx modexes (610 and above).

== See also ==
- Naval aviation
- United States Marine Corps aviation
