= Luzhu District =

Luzhu District may refer to:

- Lujhu District, Kaohsiung (路竹區), district of Kaohsiung, Taiwan
- Luzhu District, Taoyuan (蘆竹區), district of Taoyuan, Taiwan
