= Dahu railway station =

Railway station in Luzhu, Kaohsiung, Taiwan

Dahu Station 大湖車站
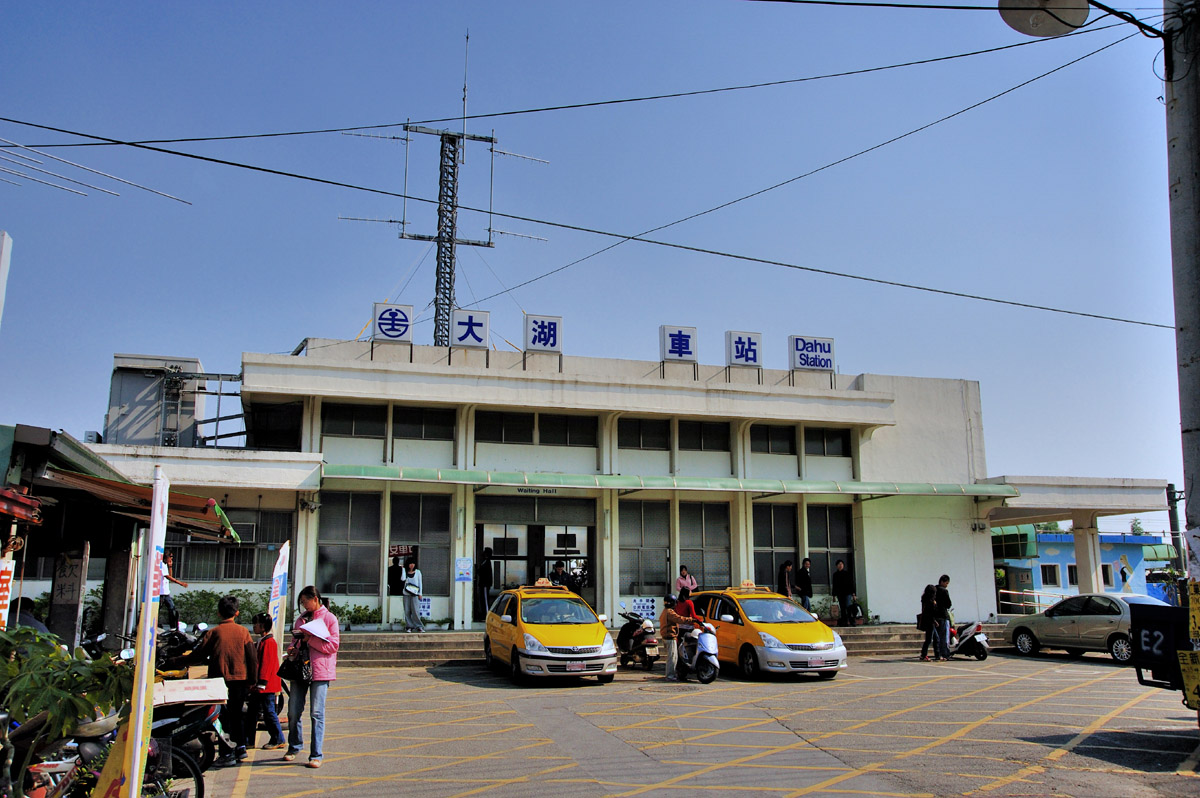

General information
- Location: Lujhu, Kaohsiung, Taiwan
- Coordinates: 22.878192°N 120.254093°E
- Owner: Taiwan Railway Corporation
- Operator: Taiwan Railway Corporation
- Line: West Coast
- Train operators: Taiwan Railway Corporation

History
- Opened: 29 November 1900

Passengers
- 3,297 daily (2024)
Location

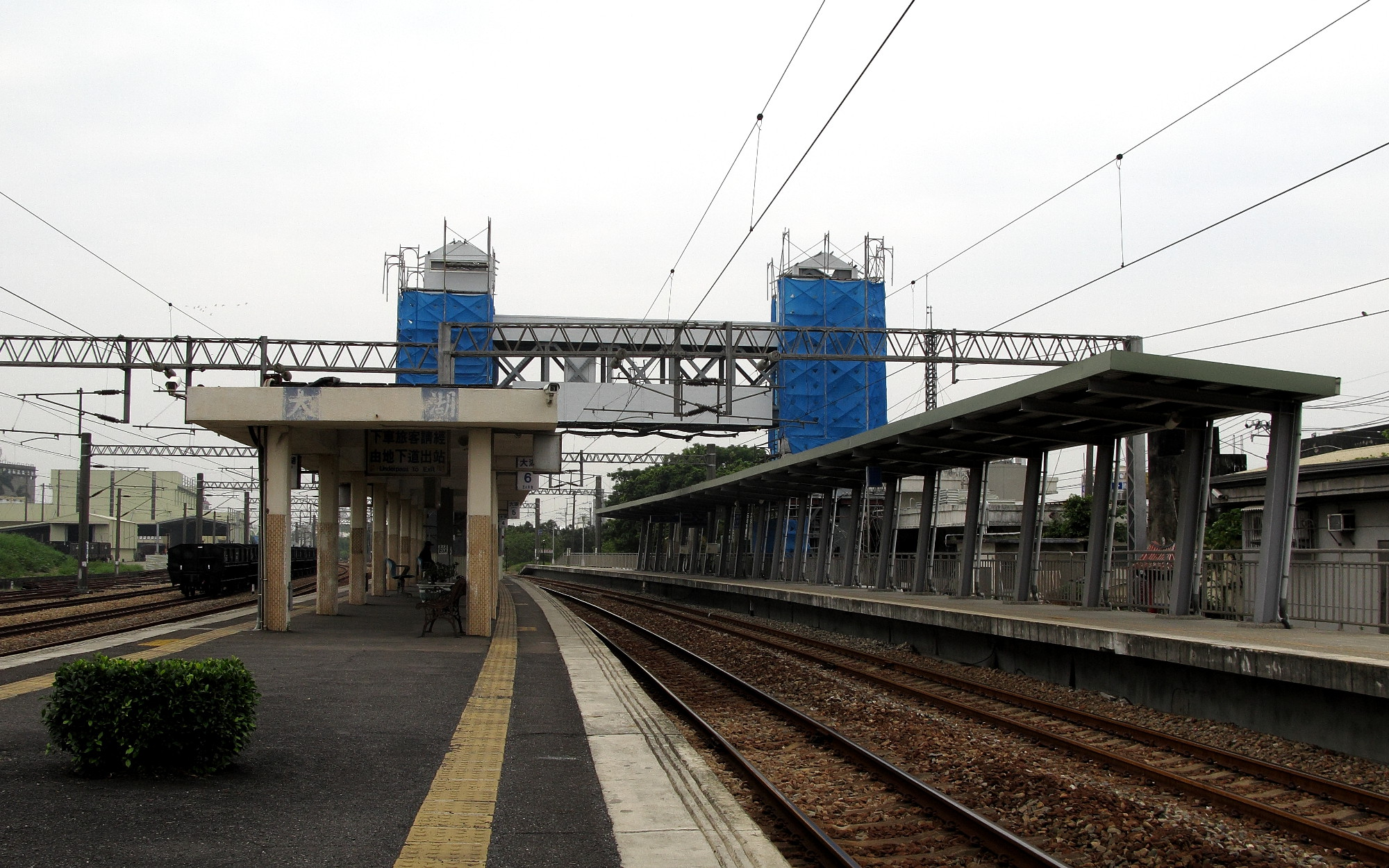
Dahu station platform

Dahu (Chinese: 大湖車站; pinyin: Dàhú Chēzhàn) is a railway station on Taiwan Railway (TR) West Coast line located in Lujhu District, Kaohsiung, Taiwan.

== History ==
The station was opened on 29 November 1900.

== Nearby stations ==
Taiwan Railway
Zhongzhou ⇐ West Coast line ⇒ Luzhu

== Around the station ==
- Tung Fang Design University

== See also ==
- List of railway stations in Taiwan
