= Hunei District =

District in Kaohsiung, Taiwan

Coordinates: 22.894995°N 120.224907°E

Hunei 湖內區
- District
- Hunei District
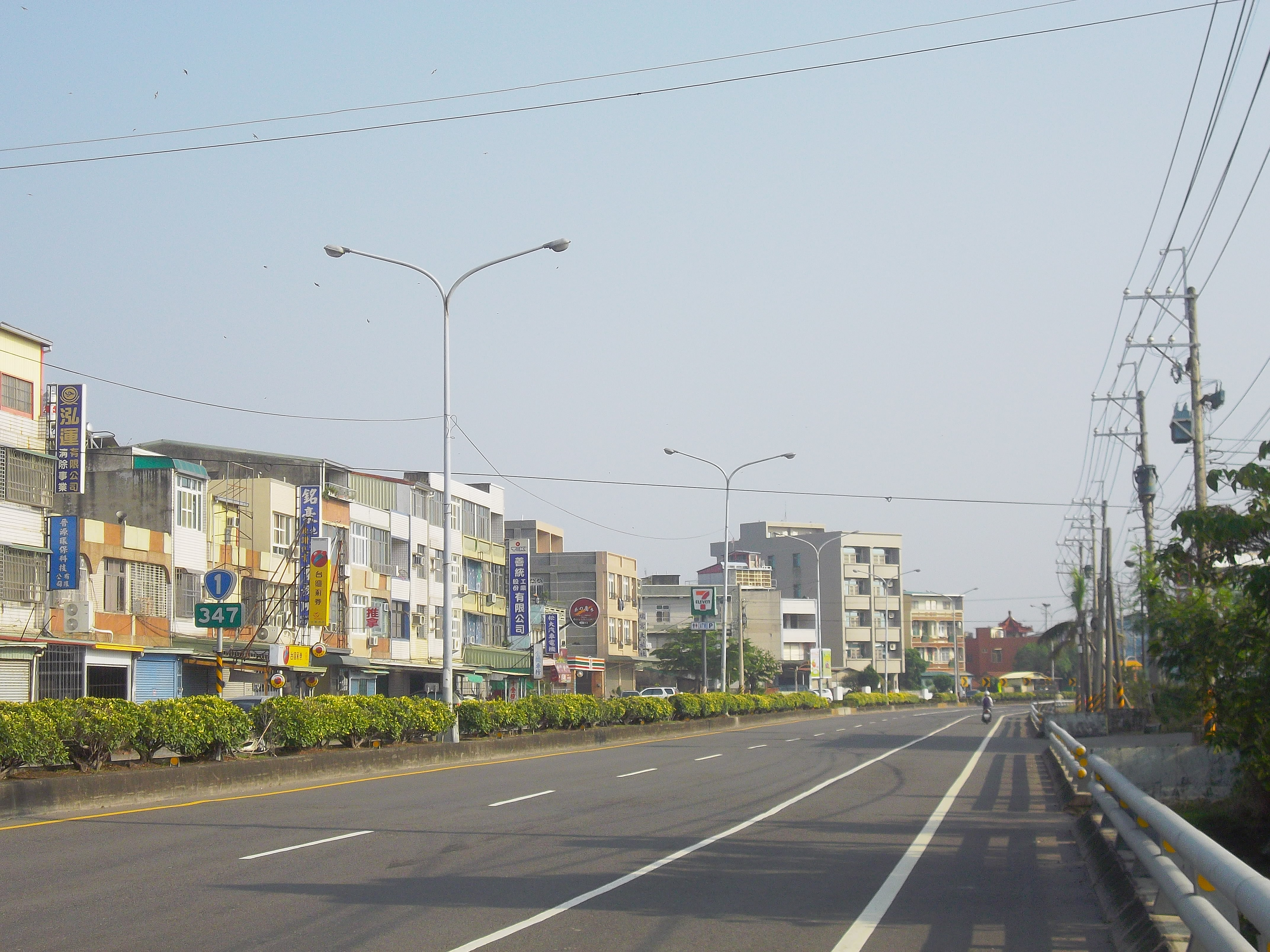

- Hunei District in Kaohsiung City
- Country: Taiwan
- Region: Southern Taiwan

Area
  - Total: 20.1615 km^{2} (7.7844 sq mi)

Population (October 2023)
  - Total: 29,577
  - Rank: 23
  - Density: 1,467.0/km^{2} (3,799.5/sq mi)
- Postal code: 829
- Website: hunei-en.kcg.gov.tw

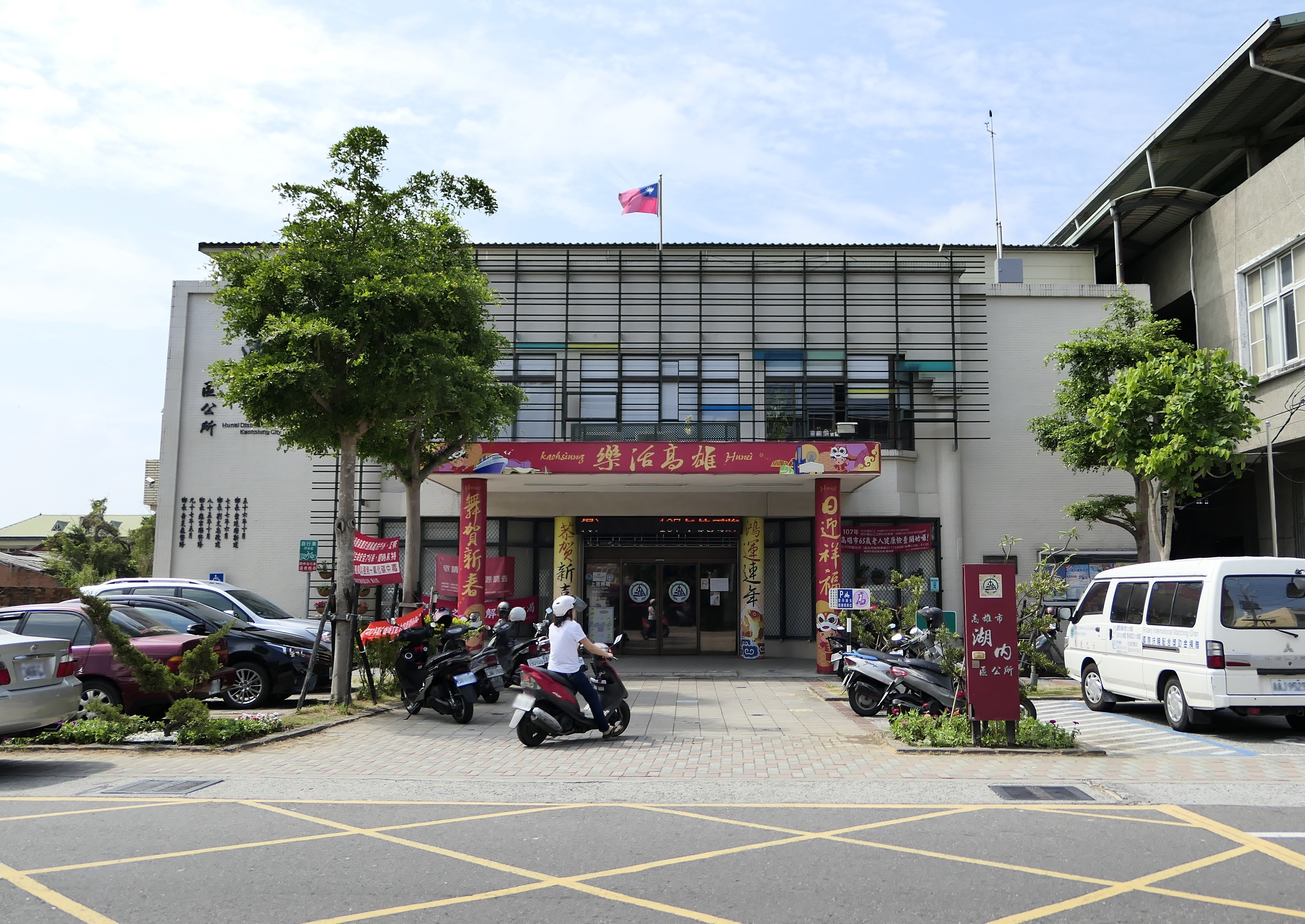
Hunei District Office

Hunei District (Chinese: 湖內區; pinyin: Húnèi Qū) is a rural district in Kaohsiung City, Taiwan.

== History ==
After the handover of Taiwan from Japan to the Republic of China in 1945, Hunei was organized as a rural township of Kaohsiung County. On 25 December 2010, Kaohsiung County was merged with Kaohsiung City and Hunei was upgraded to a district of the city.

== Administrative divisions ==
The district consists of Haishan, Liujia, Taiye, Gongguan, Yecuo, Dahu, Tianwei, Hunei, Haipu, Wenxian, Zhongxian, Yixian, Zhongxing and Hutung Village.

== Politics ==
The district is part of Kaohsiung City Constituency II electoral district for Legislative Yuan.

== Education ==
- Tung Fang Design University

== Tourist attractions ==
- Hankou Canal
- Mausoleum of Lord Ningjing, Ming Dynasty
- Shigeo Fukuda Design Museum
- TSC Mini Train Old Rail Track Reconstruction
- Yuemeichi Ciji Temple (月眉池慈济宫)
- Dahu Night Market
- Wei Zi Nei Night Market

== Notable natives ==
- Lin Yi-chuan, baseball player

== See also ==
- Kaohsiung
