= Sung Chi-li =

- Born: Sung Kan-lin (Chinese: 宋乾琳); 17 September 1948 (age 78); Xiaogang, Kaohsiung, Taiwan
- Education: Private Tung Fang Junior College of Industry and Arts
- Known for: Fraud

Sung Chi-li
- Chinese: 宋七力
Transcriptions
Standard Mandarin
- Hanyu Pinyin: Sòng Qīlì
- Wade–Giles: Sung⁴ Chʻi¹-li⁴

Alternative Chinese name
- Chinese: 宋乾琳
Transcriptions
Standard Mandarin
- Hanyu Pinyin: Sòng Gānlín

Sung Chi-li (born 17 September 1948), born Sung Kan-lin, is a notorious Taiwan cult leader and geomancer who founded the Sung Chi-li Miracle Association and the Great Sun Sect. He was embroiled in a scandal in 1996 and accused of swindling US$7 million from his followers. He was convicted of fraud in 1997 and sentenced to seven years imprisonment. His verdict was later overturned in 2003 by the high court which cited freedom of religion. Sung claims to have supernatural powers, such as the ability to appear anywhere at anytime (fēnshēn body-double manifestations). He also claims to possess divine healing powers and calls himself Yuzhou Guangmingti (宇宙光明體; lit. Cosmic Luminous Body).

== Early years ==
Sung was born in Xiaogang village, Kaohsiung County in the Taiwan Province on 17 September 1948. He is the oldest of six children; four sisters and one brother. His father was very adept at making money and worked at a wholesale fish market. His family were the first in their village to own a television and telephone.

His eldest younger sister Sung Pao-lien (宋寶蓮) recalls Sung had developed mysophobia at the age of three and would eat in the corner and wash his own bowl and chopsticks. Their father had high expectations of Sung but Sung didn't like to study so their father would get angry and beat Sung with a wooden stick but Sung was very gentle, a boy of few words and didn't get upset nor talked back. Sung recalls it was at the age of seven that he saw a beam of light follow him. When he told his classmate, they'd laugh at him. When he told his father, his father said he is crazy. Sung became a social outcast due to poor grades and being abnormal.

After highschool, Sung left home and studied at Tung Fang Design Institute, from that moment, he tried to seek answers and started to read Plato but couldn't comprehend it, then he read Socrates and Aristotle but still couldn't find an explanation for the beam of light he saw as a child.

After finishing military conscription service, Sung's father gave him NT$1 million to start a shipping business at Taichung harbor. Sung worked there for nine and a half years. His sister, Pao-lien, said she always worried about Sung because he was too kind and not cut out for business so she was taken by surprise when he became a religious master.

=== Prison and change of career ===
Sung went into hiding for two years after writing a bad check and was later imprisoned for two years.

During Sung's time in jail he saw that beam of light outside the windows and says when he was being released from jail at the age of 39 he saw the three Chinese characters Sung Chi-li (宋七力) written in the skies and changed his name to it. It was during this time that Sung says he possessed the fenshen ability. In 1987 when martial law was lifted in Taiwan, Sung, who was 39 at the time and out of prison, saw an opportunity and began to hang around tea houses, talking and demonstrating his skills. As word spread about his abilities, he was noticed by someone who then spent large amounts of money to support Sung and helped him take photos. In 1990, Sung founded the Academy of the Union of Humans and Nature and began recruiting members in Taipei. A year later he founded the Sung Chi-li Miracle Association (Chinese: 中國宋七力顯相協會; pinyin: Zhōngguó Sòng Qīlì xiǎnxiāng xiéhuì) and members believed Sung was greater than Buddha in his past life. In the nine years leading up to 1996, Sung had amassed followers and supporters numbering in the tens of thousands in nine years, including financiers and politicians. At his prime, Sung would draw large numbers of followers who came and went in groups of cars. Sung would tip them tens of thousands of NTD. He recalls giving one elderly flower seller NT$50,000. He said when he was on the run for bouncing a check, his friend refused to lend him NT$500 and he vowed he would not to become a miser himself. The first time a Next Digital reporter, 賀照縈 (He Chao-ying), did an interview, Sung handed the interviewer an envelope containing NT$10,000 cash, telling him it was a gesture of good will that the reporter's boss need not know, to which the interviewer declined to accept the gift. At the last interview, Sung tried to give the interview and his three colleagues an iPhone 6 which they also declined. The interviewer noted Sung seemed desolate so he consoled Sung.

== Controversy ==
=== Scandal ===
The scandal, known locally in Taiwan as the Sung Chi-li Incident (Chinese: 宋七力事件; pinyin: Sòng Qīlì shìjiàn), was first uncovered by Melody Chu Mei-fong, then Taipei city councillor who accused Sung of conning disciples by selling them high-priced photos of him demonstrating his supernatural powers and that by worshiping the pictures, his followers could become a buddha. She also accused Frank Hsieh, who was legal consultant of Sung, of taking NT$16 million in political donations from Sung and that Hsieh's wife helped with compiling and publishing books for Sung. Sung and 16 defendants were then sued by former followers and he was indicted on charges of deception for obtaining NT$3 billion in donations by claiming to have supernatural powers by which he could help people. Sung was arrested on 13 October 1996

Due to a string of religious cult scandals making news headlines such as Sung Chi-li swindling NT$3 billion and Master Miao Tien swindling NT$2 billion, the Executive Yuan organized for the first time a forum to discuss the role and regulation of religion in Taiwan. The forum was held in Taipei on 8 November 1996 and attended by 110 senior government officials, religious leaders and scholars from 12 religious communities. The forum blamed the public's ignorance that allowed cult swindling to thrive.

On 23 October 1997, Sung and two assistants Chen Cheng-tung (鄭振冬) and Lo Cheng-hung (羅正弘) were convicted of fraud. Sung and Chen were sentenced to seven years, while Lo was sentenced to two years prison. Frank Hsieh's wife and 13 others were acquitted of deception. During police investigations, Sung insisted he had supernatural powers and could make anyone do as he willed. Police challenged him by inviting him to demonstrate his powers in public but Sung failed to make a standing police officer to sit down. Sung's divine photos were proven to be doctored using basic computer graphic skills.

The case gained public notoriety when Frank Hsieh, who was a lawyer and legal consultant to Sung at the time, and his wife Yu Fang-chih (游芳枝), were reported to be long time followers of Sung. Yu went so far as to profess personally witnessing Sung's spirit leave his body at will. In 2005, Sung told TVBS cable news that in 2004 at a gathering in a follower's home, he had taken Hsieh on an outer body tour of Paris with a stopover at the Eiffel Tower where they could touch the cast iron. Hsieh temporarily disappeared from the political scene after it was alleged he had taken inappropriate political donations from Sung and faced fierce criticism from the public over his membership in Sung's cult

Sung admitted to police in charge of the investigation that he lied about having supernatural powers and police demolished the Miracle Association Memorial Hall, his Transmogrification Society's main shrine, on the grounds that it was built illegally. The shine contained faked photos of Sung in various states of fenshen which were used by his associates to fool followers into believing Sung's divinity. Sung also made donations to political parties.

In 1998, Sung founded a new religion, the Great Sun Sect whose members are believed to be in the hundreds but an accurate number has not been determined (Chinese: 大日宗; pinyin: Dà rì zōng)

=== High Court appeal ===
Although the scandal had almost hurt Hsieh's political career, he surprised everyone by winning the 1998 Kaohsiung City mayoral election despite being ridiculed and criticized for his link to Sung. The high court trial was reopened a few days after Hsieh's election victory.

On 28 January 2003, the High Court overturned Sung's fraud conviction citing that the constitution protected Sung's practices under the freedom of religion which banned the law from defining and intervening in people's beliefs. This despite prosecutors pointing out Sung had admitted to lying about his mystic powers. Under the protection of freedom of religion, the High Court decided that faith was more important than authenticity and that not only would it be difficult to prove Sung did not have supernatural abilities but that also accusers' testimonies were not sufficient to prove that Sung had defrauded them of money. Frank Hsieh was quoted as saying ""Religion cannot be analysed by reason."

In 2004, with the financial support of his followers in Australia, Sung opened a US$3 million "divine photo shop" to display his divine photos.

In an interview with Next Media in 2008, Sung says he is a mysophobe and has never had any sexual relations.

In 2015, SET News interviewed Sung regarding his supernatural powers, the reporter asked Sung if he could demonstrate his powers especially his fenshen ability. Sung objected and insisted that only followers who have awakened their third eye could see the supernatural. He also demonstrated his abilities of being able to control his followers' bodies with his mind, to which his followers played along, but it had no effect on the reporter and cameraman. Next Digital also followed up and Sung admitted he is a controversial figure but that he was not afraid of punishment because he has no family and no children to worry about.

== See also ==
- List of con artists
- Religion in Taiwan
