= Tung Fang Design University =

University in Hunei, Kaohsiung, Taiwan

- 東方設計大學
- Type: Private
- Established: January 1966 (as Private Tung Fang Junior College of Industry and Arts); 2010 (as Tung Fang Design Institute); 2017 (as Tung Fang Design University)
- President: Yeh Ron-chuen
- Students: 2,857
- Location: Hunei, Kaohsiung, Taiwan; 22°52′47.5″N 120°14′49″E
- Website: Official website (in Chinese)

Tung Fang Design University
- Traditional Chinese: 東方設計大學
Transcriptions
Southern Min
- Hokkien POJ: Tang-hong Siat-kè Tāi-ha̍k

Tung Fang Design University (Chinese: 東方設計大學; Pe̍h-ōe-jī: Tang-hong Siat-kè Tāi-ha̍k) is a university located in Hunei District, Kaohsiung, Taiwan.

The university offers undergraduate programs in Visual communication design, Industrial design, Fashion design, Digital Media design, and Creative design management.

== History ==
TF was originally established in January 1966 as Private Tung Fang Junior College of Industry and Arts. In July 1969, the junior college was renamed to Tung Fang Junior College of Industry. In October 1990, the junior college was again renamed to Tung Fang Junior College of Industry and Commerce. In August 2002, the junior college was upgraded to Tung Fang Institute of Technology and in 2010 to Tung Fang Design Institute. In 2020, the university had an enrollment rate of less than 60%. On 31 May 2024, Taiwan's Ministry of Education finalized the closure of Tung Fang Design University, to take effect in July.

== Faculties ==
- School of Arts and Design
- School of Engineering
- School of Business and Management

== Notable alumni ==
- Sung Chi-li, cult leader and geomancer

== Transportation ==
The university is accessible West from Dahu Station of Taiwan Railway.

== See also ==
- List of universities in Taiwan
