= Luzhu railway station =

Railway station in Luzhu, Kaohsiung, Taiwan

Lujhu Station 路竹車站
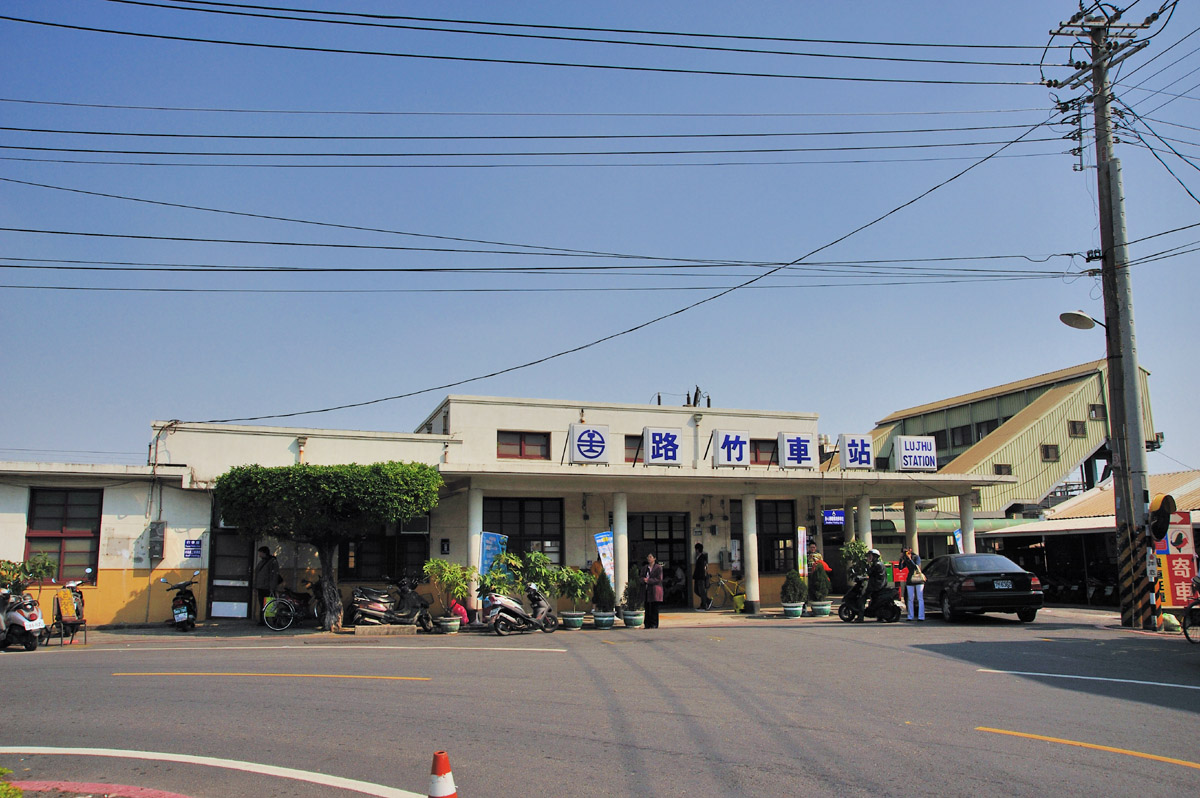

General information
- Location: Lujhu, Kaohsiung, Taiwan
- Coordinates: 22.854031°N 120.266399°E
- System: Train station
- Owner: Taiwan Railway Corporation
- Operator: Taiwan Railway Corporation
- Line: West Coast line
- Train operators: Taiwan Railway Corporation

History
- Opened: 15 December 1902

Passengers
- 3,280 daily (2024)
Location

Luzhu or Lujhu Station (Chinese: 路竹車站; Hanyu Pinyin: Lùzhú Chēzhàn; Tongyong Pinyin: Lùjhú Chejhàn) is a railway station on Taiwan Railway West Coast line located in Lujhu District, Kaohsiung, Taiwan.

== History ==
The station was opened on 15 December 1902.

== Around the station ==
- Hsinta Power Plant
- Kao Yuan University

== See also ==
- List of railway stations in Taiwan

Preceding station	Taiwan Railway	Following station
Dahu towards Keelung	Western Trunk line	Gangshan towards Pingtung
