= Taiwan Steel University of Science and Technology =

University in Luzhu, Kaohsiung, Taiwan

- 台鋼科技大學
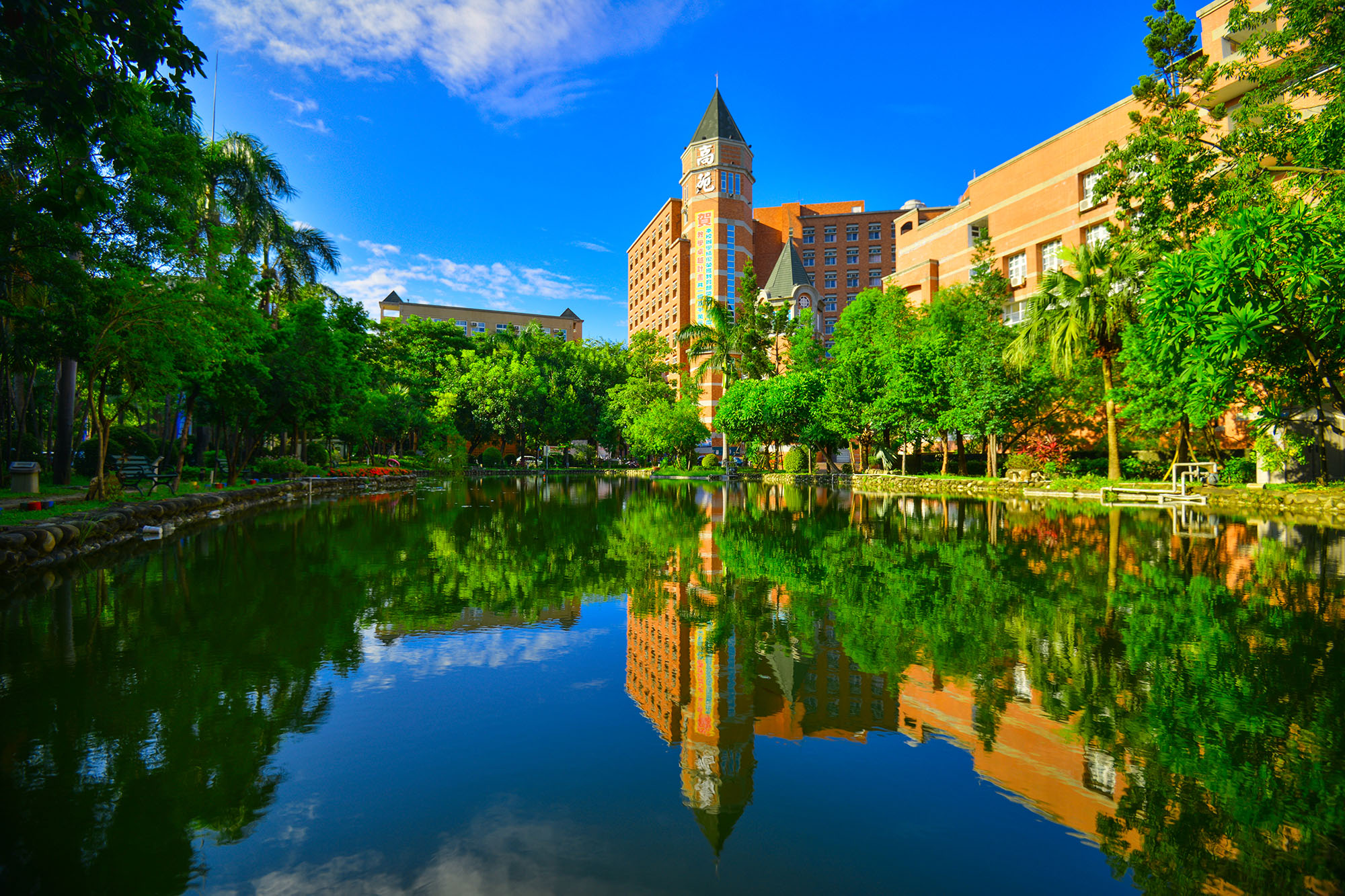
- Type: private
- Established: 1986 (as Private Kao Yuan Junior College of Technology); 2005 (as KYU); 2024 (as TSUST)
- Academic staff: 310
- Students: 10,375
- Location: Lujhu, Kaohsiung, Taiwan; 22.8415°N 120.2646°E
- Website: Official website

Taiwan Steel University of Science and Technology
- Traditional Chinese: 台鋼科技大學
Transcriptions

Taiwan Steel University of Science and Technology (TSUST; Chinese: 台鋼科技大學) is a private university in Kaohsiung Science Park, Lujhu District, Kaohsiung, Taiwan.

TSUST offers a wide range of undergraduate and graduate programs, including programs in engineering, management, design, humanities, and social sciences. Some of the most popular programs at TSUST include Industrial Design, Mechanical Engineering, Information Management, and International Business.

The university also offers several graduate programs, including Master's degrees in Business Administration, Industrial Design, and Mechanical Engineering.

== History ==
The university was originally established in 1986 as Private Kao Yuan Junior College of Technology. In 1989, it was approved by the Ministry of Education and subsequently it started recruiting students. In 1991, it was renamed to Kao Yuan Junior College of Technology and Commerce and again to Kao Yuan Institute of Technology in 1998. It was finally renamed to Kao Yuan University in 2005.

In 2023, the university had an enrollment rate of 15.7%, the lowest in Taiwan in that year.

KYU was taken over by Taiwan Steel Group in 2024 and renamed Taiwan Steel University of Science and Technology.

== Faculties ==
- College of Business and Management
- College of Engineering
- College of Informatics
- College of Mechatronics Engineering

== Campuses ==
The university consists of two campuses. The first campus named Campus One covers an area of 11 hectares and the second campus named Campus Two covers 14.2 hectares.

== Library ==
The university library consists of two joint buildings. The first building was constructed in 1996 and the second one in 2005. The library total space is 13,641 m^{2}. The library has more than 292,000 volume of books and more than 470 title of periodicals.

== Transportation ==
The university is accessible within walking distance South of Luzhu Station of Taiwan Railway.

== See also ==
- List of universities in Taiwan
