= Lujhu District, Kaohsiung =

District in Kaohsiung, Taiwan

Coordinates: 22.858777°N 120.265591°E

Lujhu 路竹區 Luzhu
- District
- Lujhu District
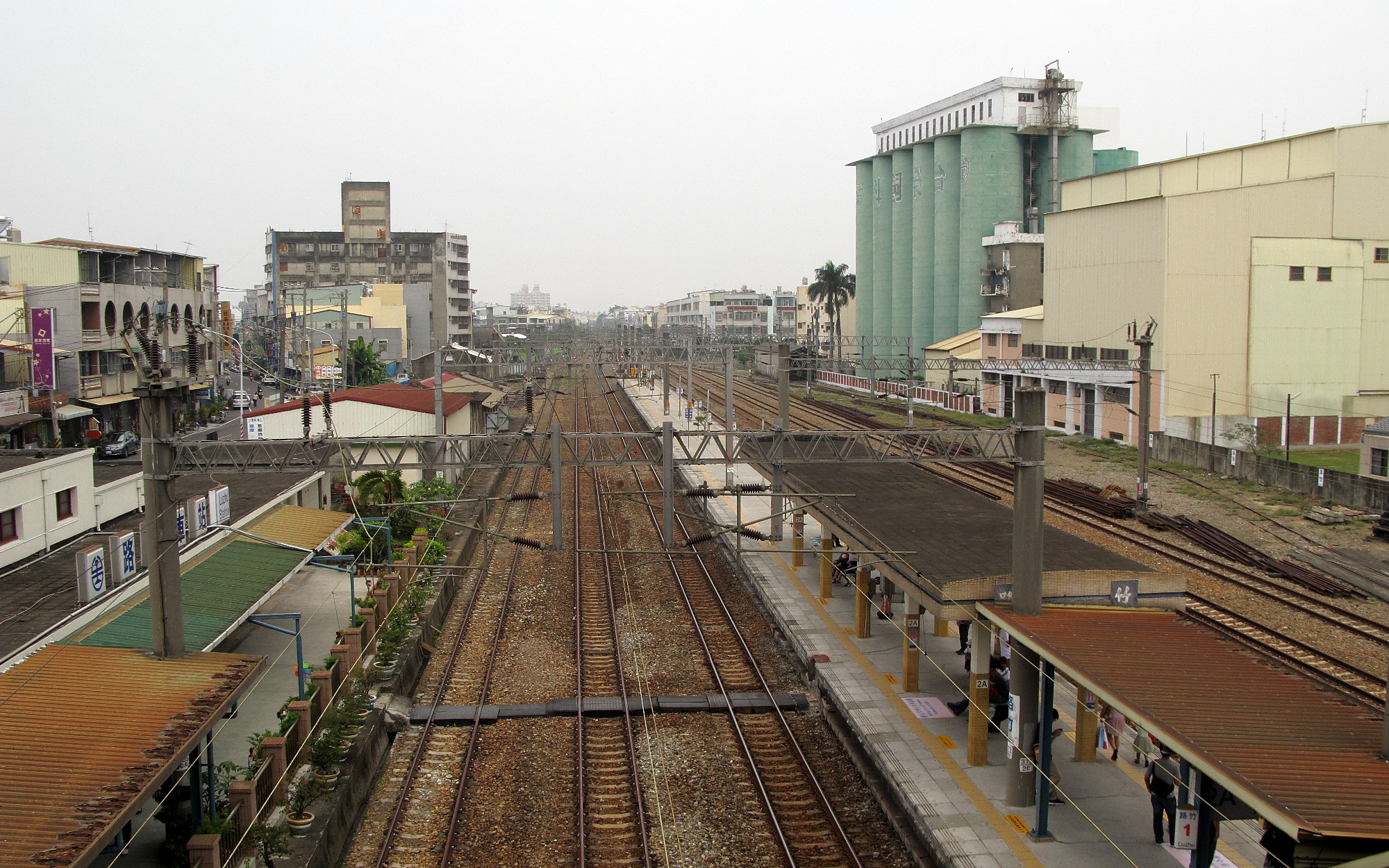

- 高雄市路竹區公所; LUJHU DISTRICT OFFICE KAOHSIUNG CITY

- Lujhu District in Kaohsiung City
- Country: Taiwan
- Region: Southern Taiwan

Population (October 2023)
  - Total: 50,393
- Website: lujhu-en.kcg.gov.tw

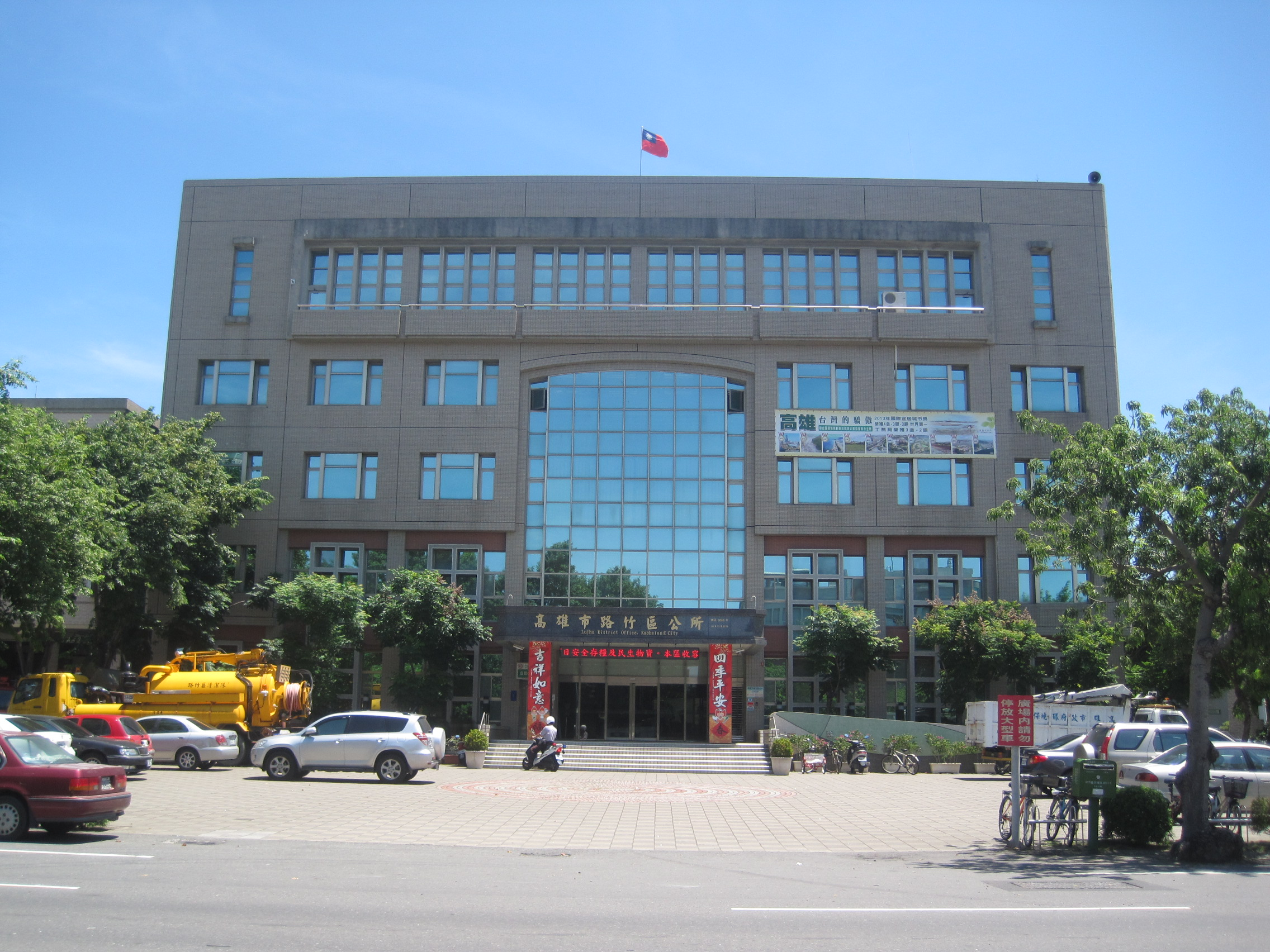
Lujhu District Office

Lujhu District (Chinese: 路竹區; Hanyu Pinyin: Lùzhú Qū; Tongyong Pinyin: Lùjhú Cyu; Wade–Giles: Lu^{4}-chu^{2} Ch'ü^{1}) is a suburban district of Kaohsiung City, Taiwan.

== History ==
After the handover of Taiwan from Japan to the Republic of China in 1945, Lujhu was organized as a rural township of Kaohsiung County. On 25 December 2010, Kaohsiung County was merged with Kaohsiung City and Lujhu was upgraded to a district of the city.

== Administrative divisions ==
The district consists of Zhuhu, Dingliao, Xinda, Houxiang, Beiling, Shexi, Jiabei, Jianan, Xiakeng, Zhuyuan, Zhutung, Zhuxi, Wenbei, Wennan, SanyevYaliao, Shetung, Shezhong, Zhunan and Shenan Village.

== Politics ==
The district is part of Kaohsiung City Constituency II electoral district for Legislative Yuan.

== Education ==
- Shu Zen College of Medicine and Management
- Taiwan Steel University of Science and Technology

== Transportation ==
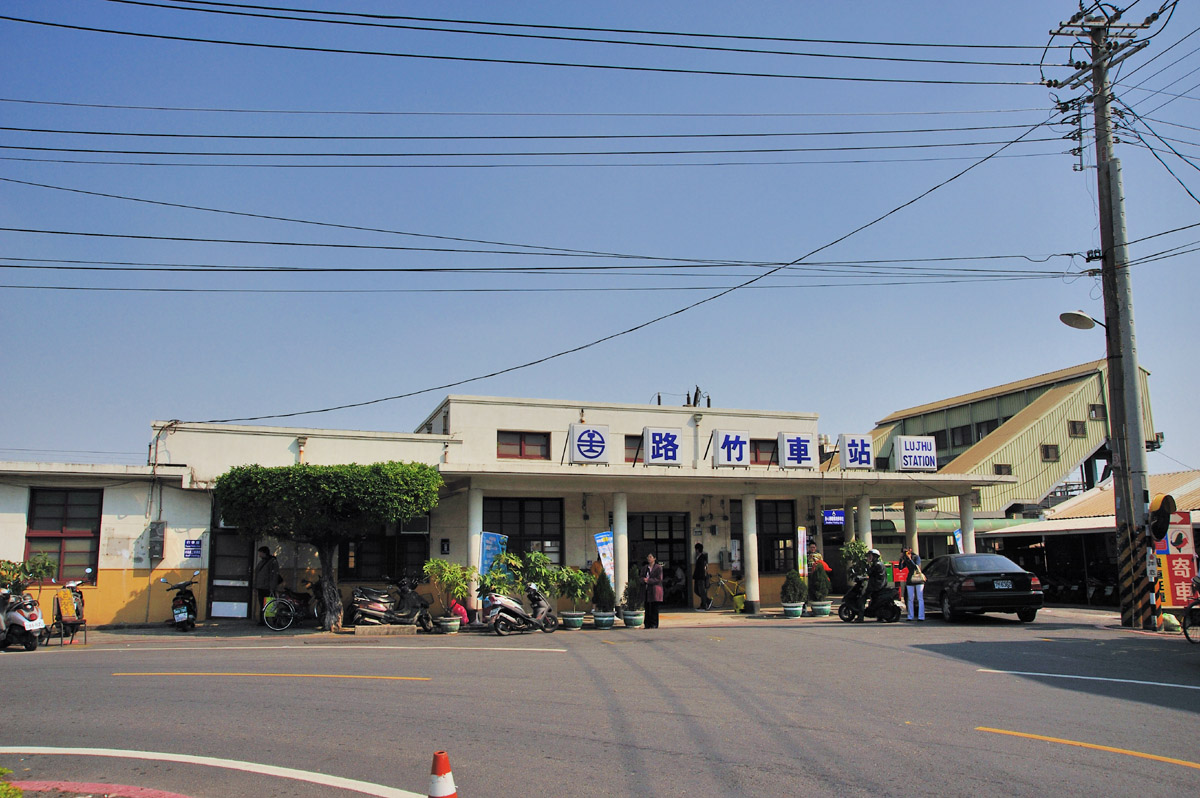
Lujhu Station

- TR Dahu Station
- TR Luzhu Station

== Tourist attractions ==
- Yijia Guanyin Temple
- Huashan Temple (dedicated to Lord Ningjing)

== Notable natives ==
- Wang Jin-pyng, President of Legislative Yuan (1999–2016)

== See also ==
- Kaohsiung
