= Beaver County Airport =

Airport in Pennsylvania, United States

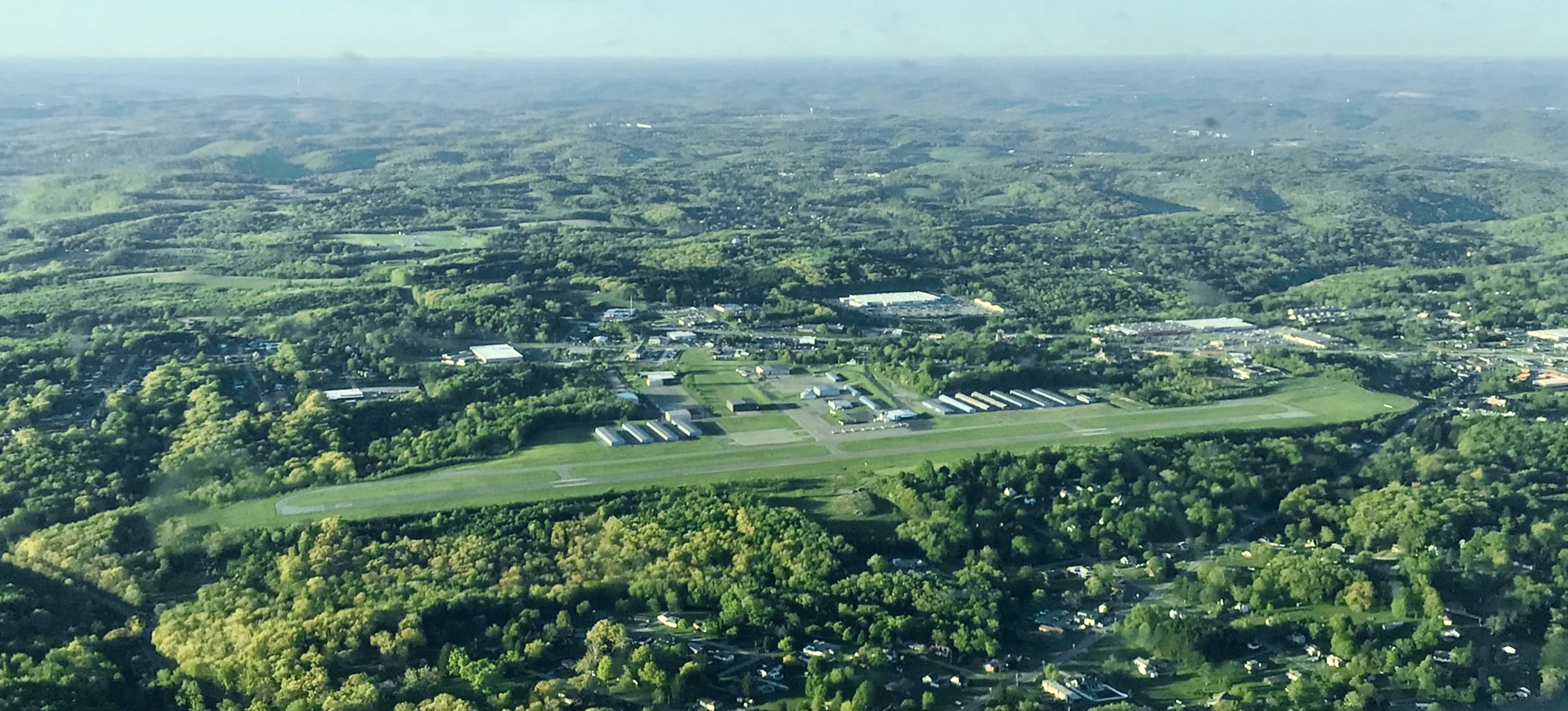
- Airport diagram
- IATA: BFP; ICAO: KBVI; FAA LID: BVI

Summary
- Airport type: Public
- Owner: County of Beaver
- Serves: Beaver, Pennsylvania, Beaver Falls, Pennsylvania, Chippewa Township, Pennsylvania
- Elevation AMSL: 1,253 ft (382 m)
- Coordinates: 40°46′21″N 080°23′29″W
- Website: Official website

Map
- Location of airport in Pennsylvania BVI (the United States)

Runways
Direction	Length		Surface
Direction	ft	m	Surface
10/28	4,501	1,372	Asphalt

Statistics (2024)
- Aircraft operations (12 months ending May 31, 2022): 75,370
- Based aircraft: 121
- Source: Federal Aviation Administration

Beaver County Airport or (IATA: BFP, ICAO: KBVI, FAA LID: BVI) is a county-owned public airport three miles northwest of Beaver Falls, in Beaver County, Pennsylvania.

Most U.S. airports use the same three-letter location identifier for the FAA and IATA, but Beaver County Airport is BVI to the FAA and BFP to the IATA (which assigned BVI to Birdsville Airport in Birdsville, Queensland, Australia).

== Facilities ==
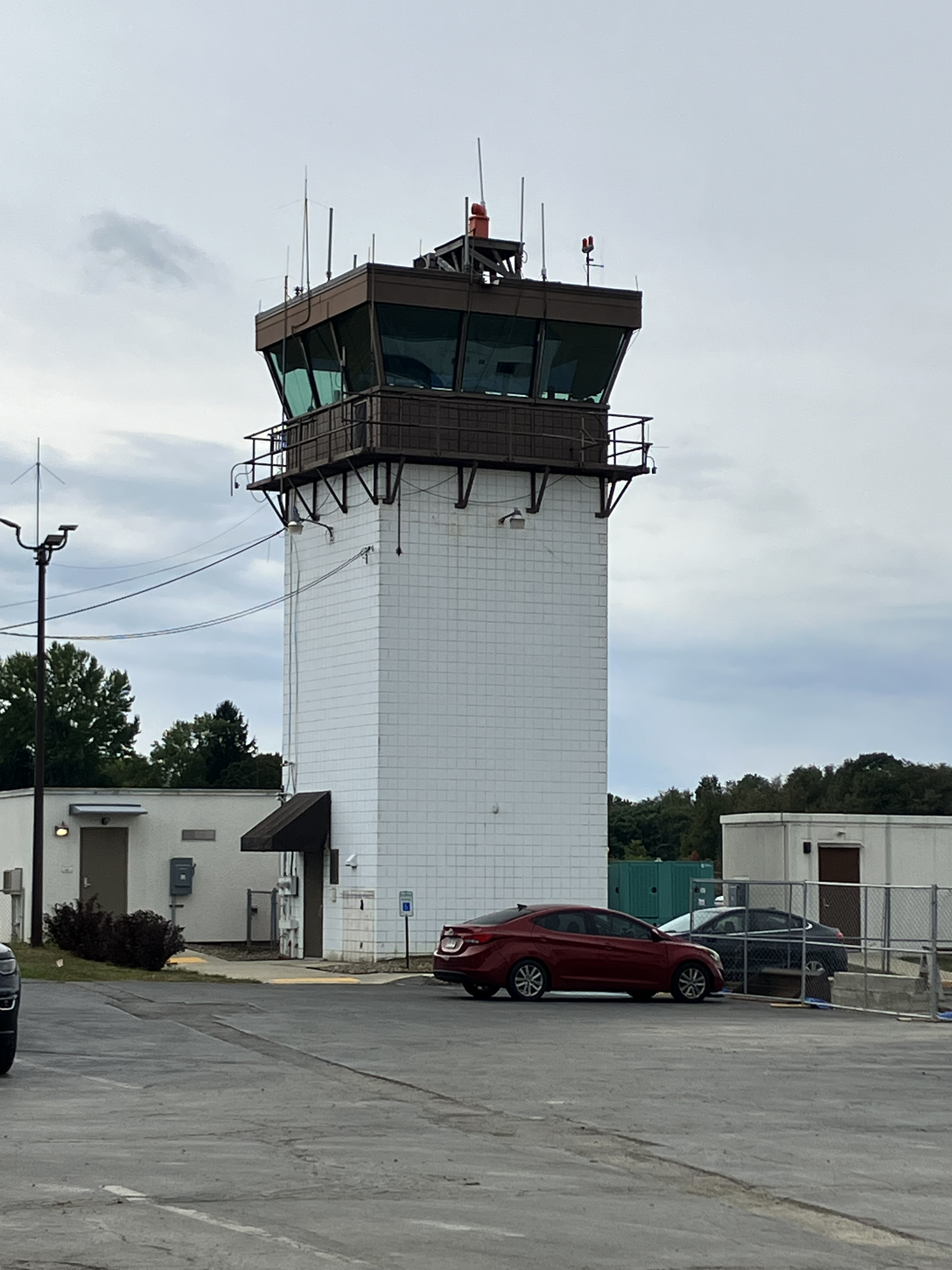
Air traffic control tower

The airport covers 297 acres (120 ha) and has one asphalt runway, 10/28, 4,501 x 100 ft (1,372 x 30 m). In the year ending June 30, 2019, the airport had 66,218 aircraft operations, average 181 per day: 100% general aviation. 114 aircraft are based at this airport: 97 single-engine, 11 multi-engine, 5 jet and 1 helicopter.

== B-17 Nine-O-Nine ==
On August 23, 1987, the B-17 Flying Fortress Nine-O-Nine crashed during an airshow at the airport. The plane was attempting to land but ran off the end of the runway and was badly damaged. After being repaired and continuing flying at airshows across the United States for many years afterwards, (there was an incident in July 1995 involving a landing gear malfunction) on October 2, 2019, the Nine-O-Nine crashed at Bradley International Airport attempting to return to the airport after having mechanical issues, seven of the 13 on board were killed and seven were injured, including one on the ground. The aircraft was destroyed by fire.

== Beaver Valley Flying Club, Inc ==
The Beaver Valley Flying Club, Inc is a not-for-profit organization which has been in operation since 1967 on the Airport. The Club operates a G500 Cessna 172 and a Cirrus SR20.

== Flight Schools ==
Aces Aviation offers flight training Single Engine Diamonds (DA20-C1 and DA-40), and multi engine training in a Beechcraft Baron.

Moore Aviation Inc offers flight training in single and multi engine aircraft from the Cessna and Piper aircraft families.

Both flight schools can take a student from zero time to Recreational or Private Pilot, Instrument Rating, Commercial, Multi-Engine and Certified Flight Instructor Ratings. They are also listed as providers for the Community College of Beaver County's Aviation Sciences programs.

== Air Heritage Aviation Museum ==
Air Heritage Aviation Museum is located by the airport, and has several vintage aircraft, including an F-15 Eagle and a C-123K Provider.

== See also ==
- List of airports in Pennsylvania
