= Fairchild C-123 Provider =

Military transport aircraft series by Chase Aircraft, later Fairchild Aircraft

C-123 Provider
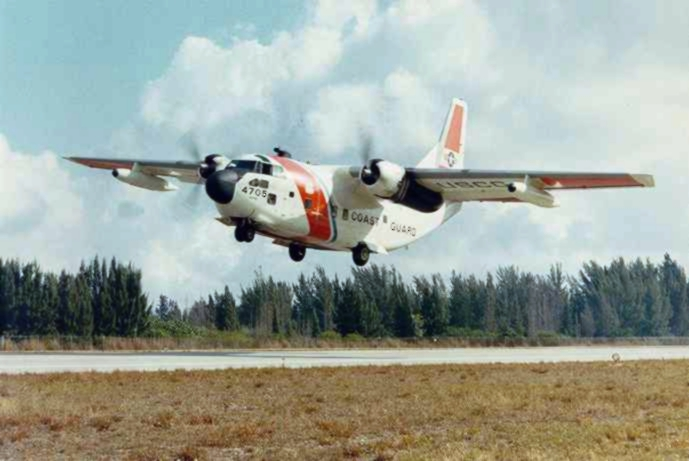
- A United States Coast Guard HC-123B Provider from CGAS Miami.

General information
- Type: Military transport aircraft
- National origin: United States
- Manufacturer: Chase Aircraft; Fairchild Aircraft
- Primary users: United States Air Force (historical) United States Coast Guard (historical); South Vietnam Air Force (historical)
- Number built: 307

History
- Manufactured: 1949–1970
- Introduction date: 1956
- First flight: 14 October 1949
- Retired: 1995 (Royal Thai Air Force)
- Developed from: Chase XCG-20
- Variants: Chase XC-123A; Stroukoff YC-134

The Fairchild C-123 Provider is an American military transport aircraft designed by Chase Aircraft and built by Fairchild Aircraft for the U.S. Air Force. In addition to its USAF service, which included later service with the Air Force Reserve and the Air National Guard, it was also operated by the U.S. Coast Guard and several air forces in Southeast Asia. During the Vietnam War, the C-123 was used to deliver supplies, to evacuate the wounded, for agent insertions behind enemy lines, and was used to spray Agent Orange.

== Design and development ==
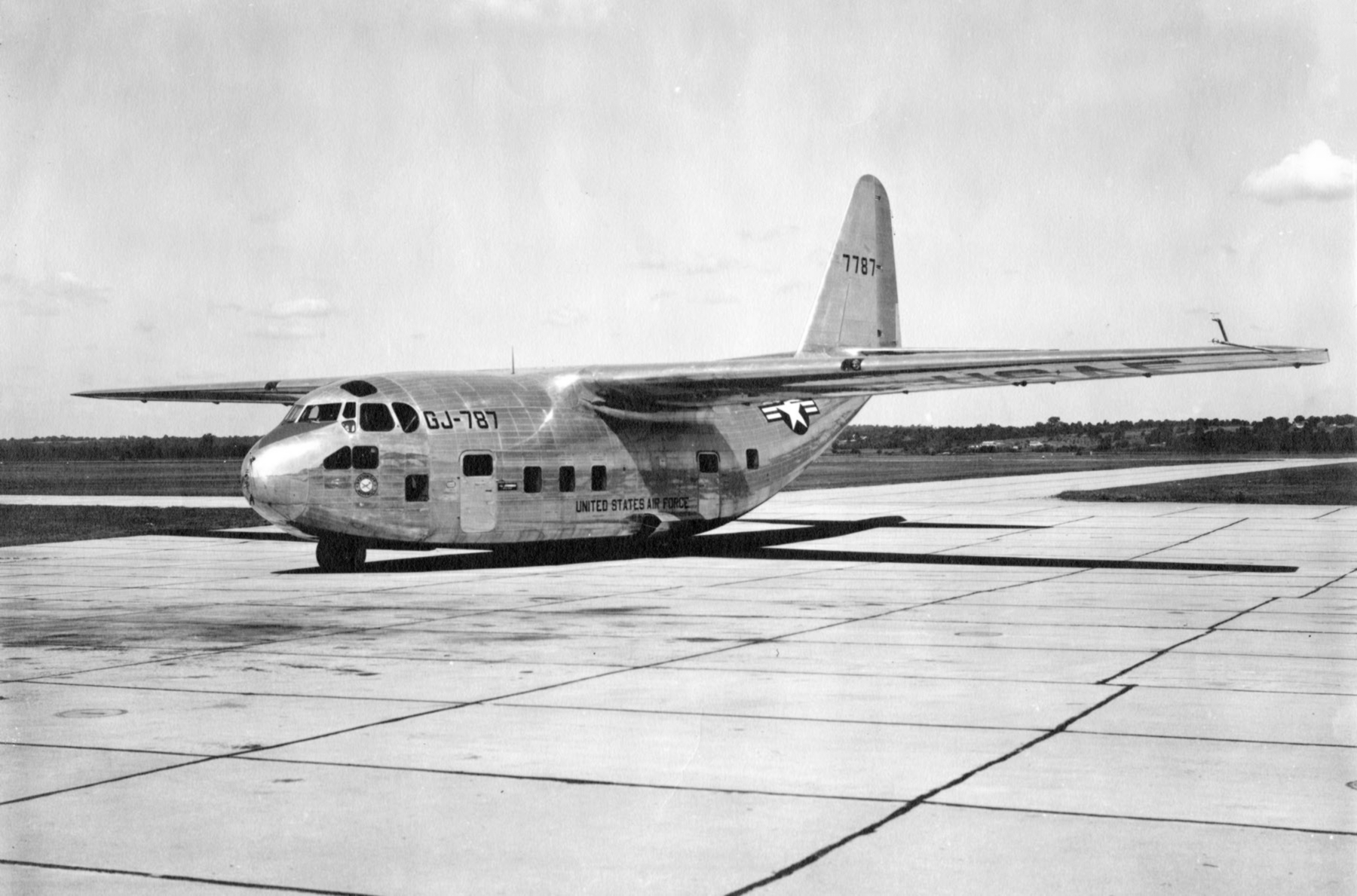
A Chase XG-20 glider, which was later converted to the XC-123A prototype.

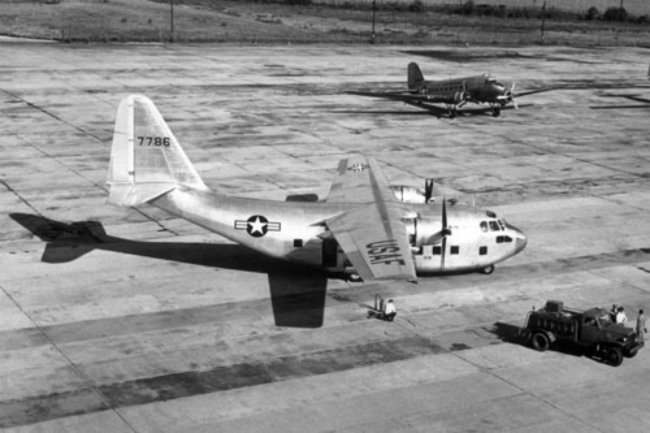
The XC-123 prototype.

The C-123 Provider was designed originally as an assault glider aircraft for the United States Air Force (USAF) by Chase Aircraft as the XCG-20 (Chase designation MS-8 Avitruc) Two powered variants of the XCG-20 were developed in the early 1950s, as the XC-123 and XC-123A. The only difference was the class of engines used. The XC-123 used two Pratt & Whitney R-2800-23 air-cooled radial piston engines, while the XC-123A was fitted with four General Electric J47-GE-11 turbojets, in two pods. The XC-123A also has the distinction, while being experimental, of being the first USAF's jet-powered military transport.

While the piston-powered XC-123 was initially well-regarded for its ruggedness, reliability, and its ability to operate from short and unimproved airstrips, the turbojet-powered XC-123A – designed for high-speed transport between USAF bases for critical parts and personnel – was found unable to operate from short and rough airstrips. There was also no practical speed advantage due to the wing and fuselage design, and a drastic reduction in range. Only the one turbojet-powered test and evaluation version was built.

While the United States Air Force was interested in placing an order for the new transport, Chase did not have the production capacity to meet the Air Force's needs, and sought a partner to handle production of the new aircraft. By 1953, Henry J. Kaiser purchased a majority share in Chase Aircraft, feeling that after having completed C-119s for Fairchild under contract, he could take control of the impending C-123 contract.

Two airframes were completed at Kaiser's Willow Run factory in Ypsilanti, Michigan, before a pricing scandal that led to Kaiser's being told that no further contracts with him would be honored. The C-123 contract was put up for bid, and the two completed airframes scrapped. The contract was awarded to Fairchild Engine and Airplane, who assumed production of the former Chase C-123B, a refined version of the XC-123. Before turning production over to Fairchild, Chase originally named their C-123B the AVITRUC, but it never stuck.

== Operational history ==
The first recipients of C-123 aircraft were USAF transport units, soon followed by the U.S. Coast Guard (USCG) which used the aircraft for search and rescue (SAR) missions, and even the U.S. Air Force Demonstration Team, the "Thunderbirds," used C-123s for a time as a logistics support aircraft for transporting the team's ground crews and equipment. The type would also be widely exported under various U.S. military assistance programs, directly from USAF stocks.

A C-123 was used to transport President John F. Kennedy's limousine during his tour of Texas in November 1963.

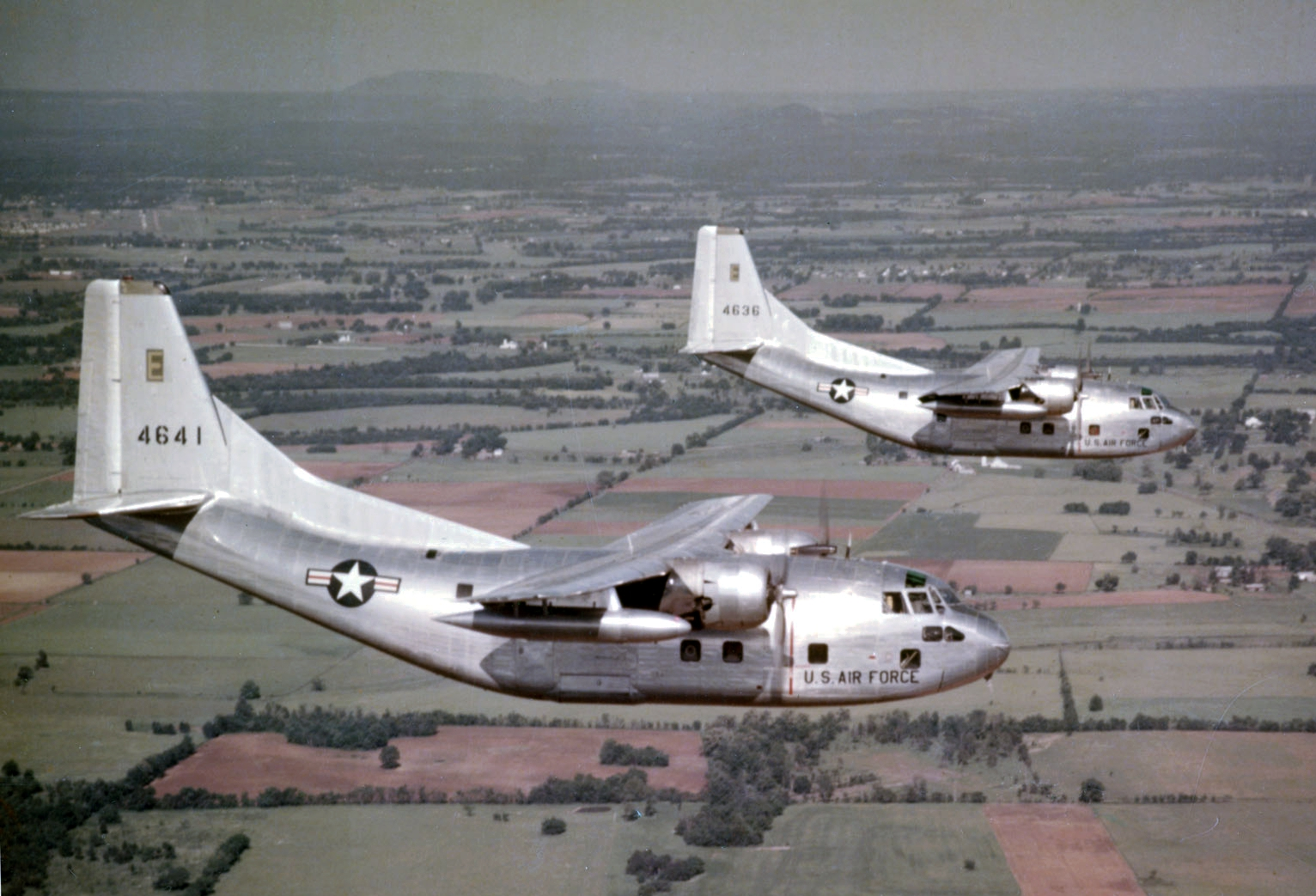
USAF C-123Bs in the 1950s.

The C-123 was nearly overlooked by the USAF for service in Vietnam, however, a political rivalry with the United States Army and the Army's use of the CV-2 Caribou and later pre-production order for the de Havilland Canada C-8 Buffalo, led to a decision to deploy C-123s to the theatre. To compete with the well-performing CV-2, the USAF and Fairchild furthered development on the C-123 to allow it to do similar work on short runways. This additional development increased the utility of the aircraft and its variants to allow it to perform a number of unique tasks, including the HC-123B which operated with the USCG fitted with additional radar equipment for search and rescue missions through 1971, and the C-123J which was fitted with retractable skis for operations in Greenland and Alaska on compacted snow runways.

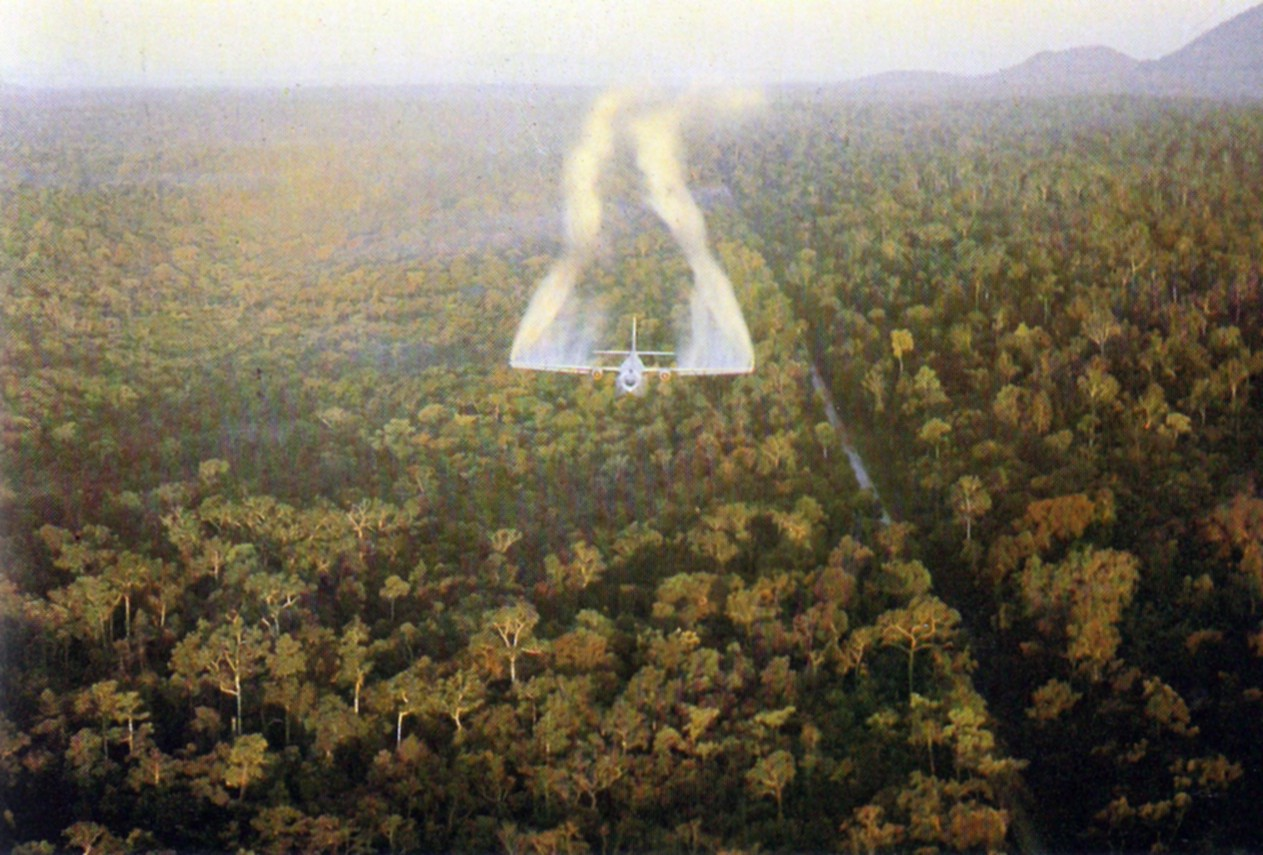
A Ranch Hand UC-123B over Vietnam in 1962.

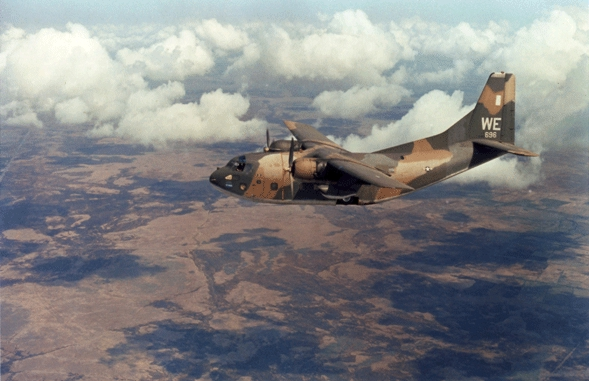
A 19th ACS C-123K over the Mekong Delta, 1969.

By 1962, the C-123K variant aircraft was evaluated for operations in Southeast Asia and their stellar performance led the Air Force to upgrade 180 of the C-123B aircraft to the new C-123K standard, which featured auxiliary jet pods underneath the wings, and anti-skid brakes. In 1968, the aircraft helped resupply troops in Khe Sanh, Vietnam, during a three-month siege by North Vietnam.

A number of C-123s were configured as VIP transports, including General William Westmoreland's White Whale. The C-123 also gained notoriety for its use in "Operation Ranch Hand" defoliation operations in Vietnam. Oddly enough, the USAF had officially chosen not to procure the VC-123C VIP transport, opting instead for the Convair VC-131D.

The first C-123s to reach South Vietnam were part of the USAF's Special Aerial Spray Flight, as part of Operation Ranch Hand tasked with defoliating the jungle in order to deny rebels their traditional hiding places. These aircraft began their operations at the end of 1961. Aircraft fitted with spraying equipment were given the U prefix as a role modifier, with the most common types being the UC-123B and the UC-123K. Aircraft configured for this use were the last to see military service, in the control of outbreaks of insect-borne disease. The C-123 was also used as "jump aircraft" for U.S. Army Airborne students located at Lawson Army Airfield, Fort Benning, Georgia from the early 1970s through the early 1980s. This aircraft was used in conjunction with both the Lockheed C-130 Hercules and Lockheed C-141 Starlifter.

In 1958, the United States Coast Guard (USCG) received its first HC-123B from the USAF, followed by seven more in 1961. Prior to the Vietnam War, the C-123B was utilized for a multitude of missions such as a troop carrier, medivac transport, and support missions from short, minimally-prepared landing strips. Installation of a dome on the nose of the aircraft accommodated a large radar allowing the plane to meet the requirements for search and rescue and long range flight over water.

The USCG crewed the aircraft with a complement of five: two officers serving as the pilot and copilot, augmented by an enlisted flight mechanic, an enlisted navigator, and an enlisted loadmaster. The HC-123B's role in the Coast Guard was slowly replaced by the longer-ranged Coast Guard HC-130 aircraft during the 1960s and 1970s as those newer airframes came on line. In 1972, the final C-123B in the USCG' inventory was retired.

With the end of the Vietnam War, remaining C-123Ks and UC-123Ks were transferred to tactical airlift units of the Air Force Reserve (AFRES) and the Air National Guard (ANG) that were operationally-gained by Tactical Air Command (TAC) before 1975 and Military Airlift Command (MAC) after 1975.

The 302nd Tactical Airlift Wing at Rickenbacker AFB (later Rickenbacker ANGB), Ohio, flew the last UC-123Ks Providers in operational service before being converted to the Lockheed C-130 Hercules. Known as the Special Spray Flight, these aircraft were used to control insect-borne diseases, with missions to Alaska, South America, and Guam being among the humanitarian missions performed by this Air Force Reserve unit.

The final examples of the C-123 in active U.S. military service were retired from the Air Force Reserve and Air National Guard in the early 1980s. Some airframes were transferred to the Federal Aviation Administration (FAA) for test and evaluation programs while others were transferred to the U.S. Department of Agriculture (USDA) for miscellaneous programs. These aircraft were also retired by the end of the 1990s.

=== Experimental projects ===
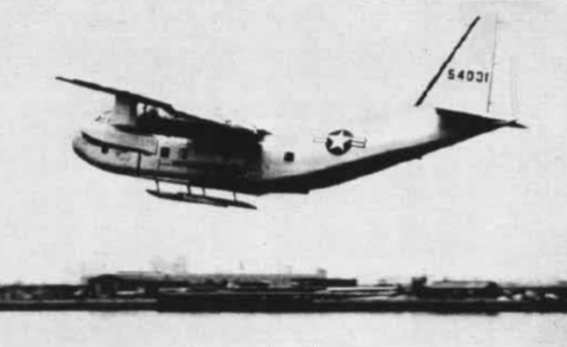
A YC-123E with a pantobase landing gear

In 1954, the YC-123D, formerly the XC-123A prototype, flew in its modified state after being converted by Stroukoff Aircraft. While the most obvious change from the original XC-123A was the switch of engines (to two 3,500 hp (2,600 kW) Wright Turbo Compound R3350-89A radial engines, turning four-blade, thirteen foot Aeroproducts constant-speed fully feathering propellers), the YC-123D also had a boundary layer control system fitted. This system directs air from the engines at high speed over the top of the wing, making the wing act as if the aircraft is flying at a higher airspeed. As a result, the YC-123D had a greatly reduced takeoff and landing distance. Compared to the C-123B, the YC-123D could land in 755 feet instead of 1,200, and takeoff with only 850 ft of runway instead of 1,950, with a 50,000 lb total weight.

In 1955, Stroukoff, under contract from the USAF, produced a single YC-123E, designed to be able to take off from any surface, and also equipped with BLC. The new aircraft also featured Stroukoff's Pantobase system, combining a ski system with a sealed fuselage and wing mounted floats, while retaining its normal landing gear. The skis worked both on snow and water, and the system effectively allowed the aircraft to land on water, land, snow or ice.

In 1956, the USAF awarded a contract to Fairchild to design an improved version of the C-123 under the designation C-136, but the contract was cancelled before the aircraft was built.

At much the same time, the YC-123H was under development, the product of a Fairchild modification program started in 1956 and completed in 1957. A "Jet Augmentation Program" for existing C-123Bs had been initiated in 1955 at the behest of the USAF, and in the YC-123H contract the USAF expanded it to allow the mounting of two pod-mounted General Electric J85 turbojets.

In 1979, the Royal Thai government, seeking to extend the life of their C-123 fleet, placed a contract with the Mancro Aircraft Company, supported by the USAF, to convert a single C-123B to turboprop powerplants. Allison T56-A-7 turboprops were used and by the time the aircraft, dubbed C-123T, was complete it had new "wet" wings, an auxiliary power unit (APU) to assist with power movement of the control surfaces, and a heating system for the cargo compartments that also fed a new de-icing system. Budgetary restrictions forced the Thai government to abandon the program in 1981, and with a lack of interested parties development of the C-123T stopped. However, it concluded the life of the C-123 by making it the only aircraft type to operate under jet, piston, and turboprop engine power, and as a glider, during its history. (Note: The DC-3/C-47 family has operated as a glider and under turboprop power, but not under jet power.)

The C-123T has recently been revived by a joint venture between the US-based Fleetwings Aircraft Company and the South African company Elmer Group. In 2010, they announced a project to initially remanufacture old airframes for African customers and, where there was demand, to build new aircraft. The airframes would be fitted with new turboprop Rolls-Royce T56-A-15 engines, a glass cockpit and other enhancements. The proposed C-123T would have had a 25,000 lb payload capability, and a take-off run of just over 1,000 ft at 50,000 lb MTOW. Possible applications included maritime patrol, search and rescue, and even use as a gunship, while roll-on packages have already been developed for mid-air refueling and agricultural applications.

=== Black Spot and other special military C-123s ===
During the Vietnam War, some C-123s were modified for specialized roles. Most of these modifications were on a one- or two-aircraft level. Only the usage of C-123s as "flare ships" to illuminate targets for fixed wing gunships such as the AC-47 and AC-119G were more numerous. These aircraft operating under the call-sign Candle were flown by the USAF's 14th Special Operations Wing.

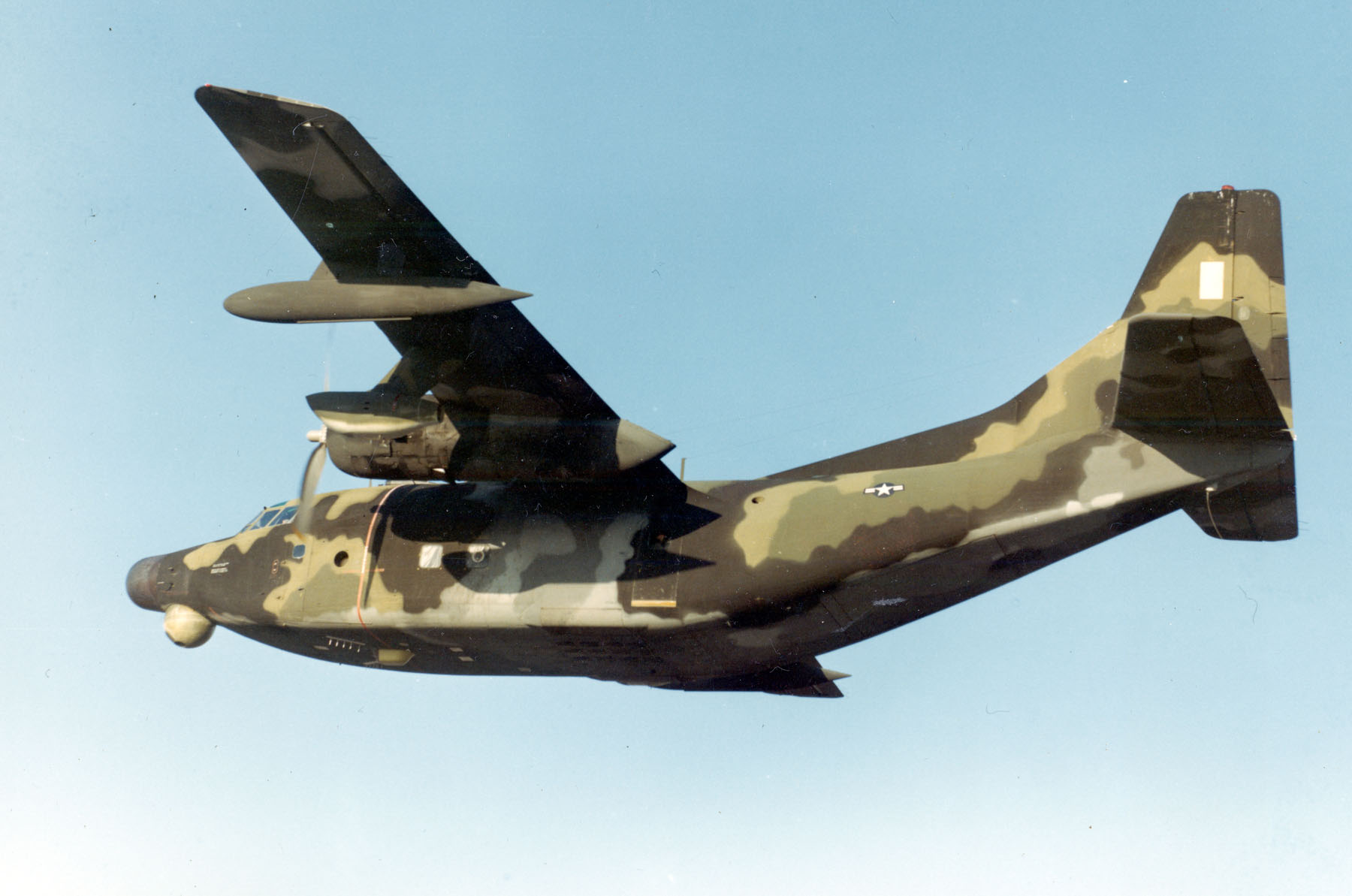
A US Air Force NC-123K "permanent test" model used over the Ho Chi Minh Trail. It was outfitted with a forward looking infrared system, low light level television, a laser rangefinder, and cluster bomb dispensers.

A single C-123B was tested as a possible replacement for the Candle aircraft, with its rear loading ramp removed and replaced with a large box with 28 large lights. The aircraft could continuously light a 2-mile (3.2 km) circle from an altitude of 12,000 ft (3,700 m). This aircraft, under the provisional designation NC-123B, was dropped because the lights fixed to the aircraft made it far easier for enemy gunners to track compared to the earlier flare ships.

The "Candle" aircraft had an extended life when several UC-123Ks were transferred to Nakhon Phanom Royal Thai Air Force Base in Thailand. During that period, it was used as a flare ship as well as a forward air control (FAC) aircraft. The flare duties were generally used for troops in contact (TIC) while the FAC mission directed air strikes in Laos over the Ho Chi Minh trail.

Another NC-123B was used as a radio relay aircraft over the Ho Chi Minh trail, with equipment to read the signals from various sensors on the ground designed to pick up enemy truck activity.

Two C-123K aircraft modified in September 1965 under Project Black Spot. The Black Spot aircraft were to fit under the "self-contained night attack capability" that was Operation Shed Light's primary focus and E-Systems of Greenville, Texas, was contracted to complete the modifications. These aircraft featured a variety of new sensors including Low Light Level TV (LLLTV), Forward Looking Infrared (FLIR), and a laser rangefinder. The aircraft looked radically different visibly from its transport brethren, as the new equipment required lengthening the nose by over 50 inches (127 cm). The aircraft also featured an armament system designed to carry BLU-3/B (using the ADU-253/B adapter) or BLU-26/B (using the ADU-272/B adapter) bomblets, or CBU-68/B cluster bombs.

The two aircraft, AF Serial Numbers 54-0691 and 54-0698, were first designated NC-123K in 1968 and then redesignated AC-123K in 1969. (Note: From Individual Aircraft Records Cards Set, provided as part of information received 24 May 2007 pursuant to Freedom of Information Act request 49112, from the Air Force Historical Research Agency, United States Air Force, Maxwell AFB, AL) These NC/AC-123Ks were first deployed operationally at Osan AB, South Korea, between August and October 1968, and flying in support of operations against North Korean infiltrators approaching by boat. The operations in Korea met with a certain level of success and as a result the NC/AC-123Ks were transferred to South Vietnam in November 1968. The aircraft operated there until January 1969, when they were redeployed to Ubon RTAB, Thailand. The two aircraft were then returned to the United States to Hurlburt Field, Florida, in May 1969, where a second round of training occurred. Four crews attended a ground school in Greenville, Texas, and returned to Hurlburt where they flew the aircraft for the first time.

The fate of the aircraft is still unclear. Sources have missions terminating in early July 1970 and the aircraft flying to the Military Aircraft Storage and Disposition Center (MASDC) "boneyard" at Davis-Monthan AFB, Arizona, where they were returned to C-123K standard, then returned to South Vietnam still wearing their camouflage and black undersides for transport duty. However, the official history states that combat operations ceased on 11 May 1969, with no mention of the second deployment. While the second deployment is mentioned in associated documentation, the only dates are of the arrival in Thailand and there is no information as to when they departed or where their destination was.

=== Covert operations ===
==== Southeast Asia ====
In 1962, the CIA acquired five C-123Bs from USAF for Air America to be used in Laos and Vietnam, and another 5 C-123Bs to be used by Republic of China Air Force (Taiwan) top secret 34th Squadron, a Black Ops units called the "Black Bat", as Flight B section (Flight A section was the two P2V-7U/RB-69A). The five Taiwan C-123Bs were sent to Lockheed Skunk Works for modifications as covert insertion aircraft with "smart" air-to-air jammer, BSTR system to jam the radars of ground anti-aircraft guns, also added a defensive operator's station to operate the jammers on board, with extra fuel in underwing tanks, with 36 Taiwanese crew finished training courses at Pope AFB by November 1962.

The five ROCAF/Taiwan/CIA C-123Bs would be used over North Vietnam as low level and nighttime covert airdrop aircraft, under the South Star II agreement, under the guise of Taiwan's national airline, China Airlines, which had "cover story" of operating Vietnamese Air Transport (VIAT) in South Vietnam, that was formerly operated by Air America. The secret outfit was based in Saigon, but would fly out of Da Nang for airdrop missions going into North Vietnam, with some missions lasting 14 hours.

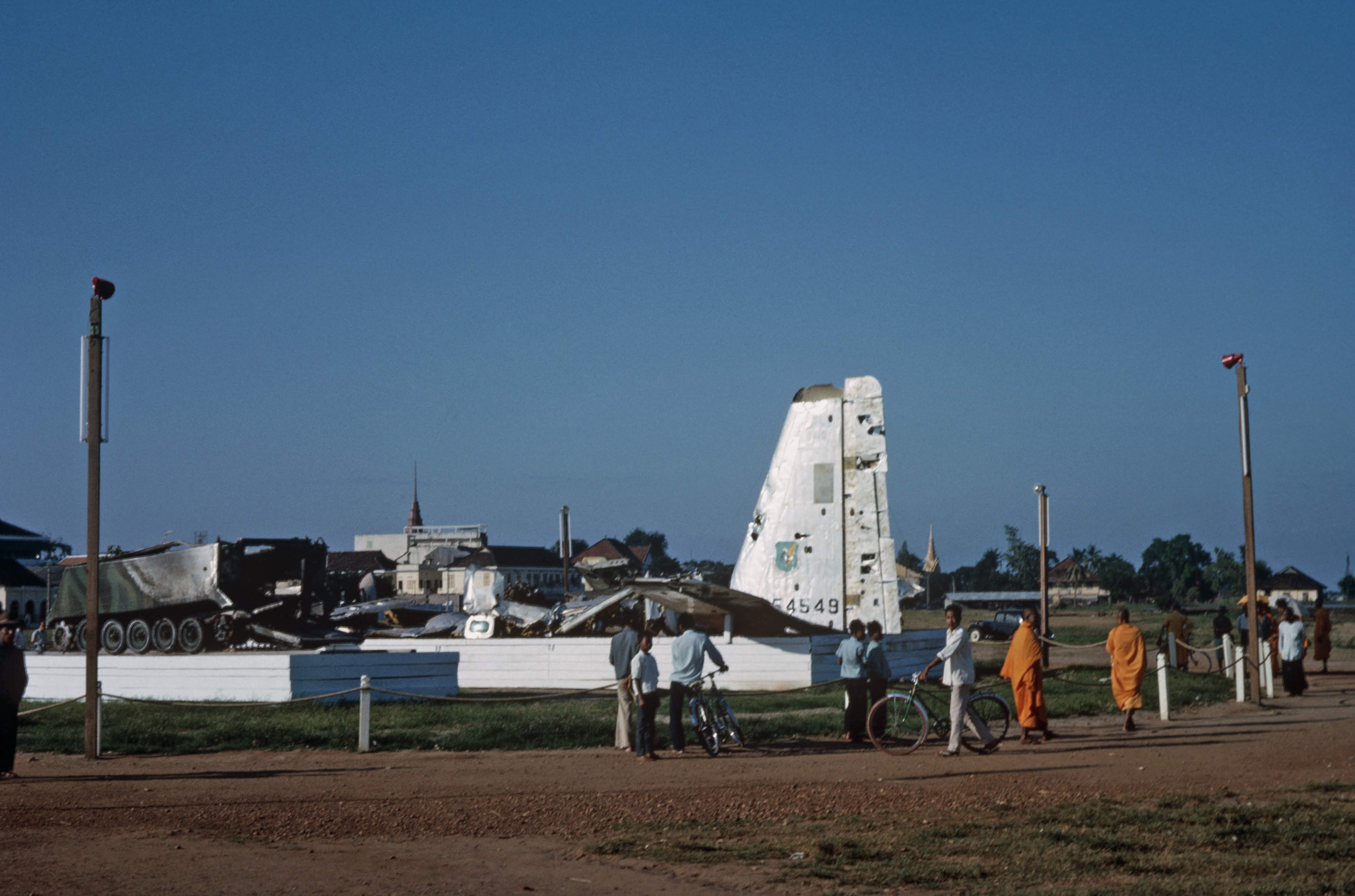
US military equipment captured by Cambodian forces, including a C-123 shot down on 24 October 1964

On 1 February 1964, the overall control of South Star II was transferred from CIA to Studies and Observations Group (SOG), as part of U.S. Military Assistance Command Vietnam (MACV) in Saigon. The outfit was redesignated as Det. 1 of USAF's 75th Troop Carrier Squadron (TCS), but within SOG it was known as the First Flight Detachment (FFD).

In May 1964, under "Project Duck Hook", six more C-123s received extensive modifications by Lockheed Air Service at Ontario, California, equipped with ATIR and BSTR ECM packages, ASN-25 Doppler navigation system, APN-153 terrain-following radar, a console station for radio operator, new HF radio and other radios. These aircraft were issued to the secret Taiwanese Black Bat unit operating in South Vietnam. In October 1964, MACV, CIA and ROCAF/Taiwan signed the South Star III agreement to continue the operation in Vietnam. The six "Duck Hook" C-123Bs were based at Nha Trang Air Base, north of Cam Ranh Bay, officially designated as USAF Det. 12 of 1131 Special Activities Squadron.

The "Duck Hook" C-123Bs were updated with RDR-10 weather radar and ARN-131 homing receiver in 1966 in order to perform missions over the Ho Chi Minh trail. All C-123Bs were converted to C-123Ks in 1968, with two wing-mounted turbojets, plus an ECM upgrade with APR-25 radar warning receiver and ALE-1 chaff dispenser. Project "Duck Hook" designation was ultimately changed to "Heavy Hook". The Det. 12 of 1131 Special Activities Squadron unit at Nha Trang received an outstanding unit award from the USAF, for flying 4,000 classified combat and combat support missions from June 1966 to May 1968.

In May 1970, C-123Ks from the "Black Bats" supported the secret U.S. military incursion into Cambodia. In October 1970, flights into Laos began. In March 1972, the SOG was deactivated, and the Southern Star operation ended with four surviving C-123Ks returned to Taiwan. On 1 March 1973, 34th "Black Bat" Squadron of ROCAF/Taiwan was disbanded.

==== Central America ====
On 5 October 1986, a Corporate Air Services C-123 Provider (HPF821, previously N4410F and USAF 54-679, (c/n 20128)) departed San Salvador-Ilopango Airport in El Salvador loaded with 70 AK-47 rifles and 100,000 rounds of ammunition, rocket grenades and other supplies. It flew along the coastline of Nicaragua and entered Nicaraguan airspace near the border with Costa Rica. Nearing San Carlos, the plane descended to 2,500 feet while preparing to drop off its cargo to Contra fighters.

While conducting the drop, the C-123 was shot down by a Sandinista soldier, using a SA-7 Grail. CIA pilots Wallace "Buzz" Sawyer and William Cooper were killed in the crash. Loadmaster Eugene Hasenfus parachuted to safety and was taken prisoner. He was later released in December 1986. The Fairchild C-123 that was shot down in Nicaragua remains there. Its sister ship, also a Fairchild C-123 purchased by the CIA at the same time as the first one, was left abandoned at San Jose International Airport for a time. It was purchased for $3,000 and disassembled into 7 pieces and transported via boat to Quepos, Costa Rica and then reassembled. It is now the center piece of a beachside cocktail lounge just up the road from Manual Antonio national park.

==== Agent Orange controversy ====
In 2011, a retired Air Force officer, Major Wesley T. Carter, filed a complaint with the Air Force Inspector General alleging that the Air Force knew that UC-123Ks used for spraying Agent Orange in Vietnam remained contaminated and that the Air Force had failed to properly inform subsequent flight crews of the risks following their transfer to the Air Force Reserve at the end of the Vietnam War. In his complaint, Major Carter contends that the Air Force has known since 1994 that the aircraft were contaminated with the defoliant; he cites the fact that when a former C-123 was being prepared for a permanent static display, workers had to use HAZMAT suits and respirators. It is asserted that when the aircraft was tested by the Air Force, it contained high levels of the known carcinogen polychlorinated dibenzodioxin, studies since confirmed by the Oregon Health Sciences University and Columbia University's Mailman School of Public Health.

The aircraft which were flown from 1972 to 1982, were assigned to the Air Force Reserve after their service in Vietnam, and used for normal cargo and aeromedical evacuation missions. Air crews accumulated hundreds of flight hours aboard several contaminated aircraft that were often flown with the windows open due to the smell and eye irritation. Memos surfaced showing that Air Force JAG officers recommended keeping the toxicity information, "...within official channels." Major Carter located Air Force reports of dioxin-contaminated aircraft sold abroad, and of one used at the Robins AFB, Georgia Museum of Aviation with public access to the contaminated surfaces of the aircraft. In 2010, due to concerns about dioxin contamination, the Air Force took the unusual step of shredding all the remaining surplus C-123K/UC-123K aircraft and melting the scraps into ingots for disposal.

On 9 June 2011, the Secretary of the U.S. Air Force's Inspector General rejected Carter's complaints, and in a subsequent message explained, "Unfortunately, we do not have the ability to identify or notify the individuals in the categories you mention" when asked if the military would alert the aircrews regarding their exposure to dioxin. On 18 June 2011, the veterans' complaint was accepted with the Department of Defense Inspector General, adding the request that the UC-123K aircraft themselves be designated by the Secretary of Defense as "Agent Orange Exposure Sites".

In December 2011, the U.S. Department of Veterans Affairs posted two notices of its decision that, while the post-Vietnam aircraft "may" have been contaminated, the aircrews were "unlikely" to have suffered exposure to dioxin. In an unusual response, the U.S. Center for Toxic Substance and Disease Registry quickly countered the VA position on 25 January 2012 with a statement by their deputy director concluding that aircrews and maintenance personnel most likely were exposed well beyond military and government surface-wipe screening levels.

== Variants ==
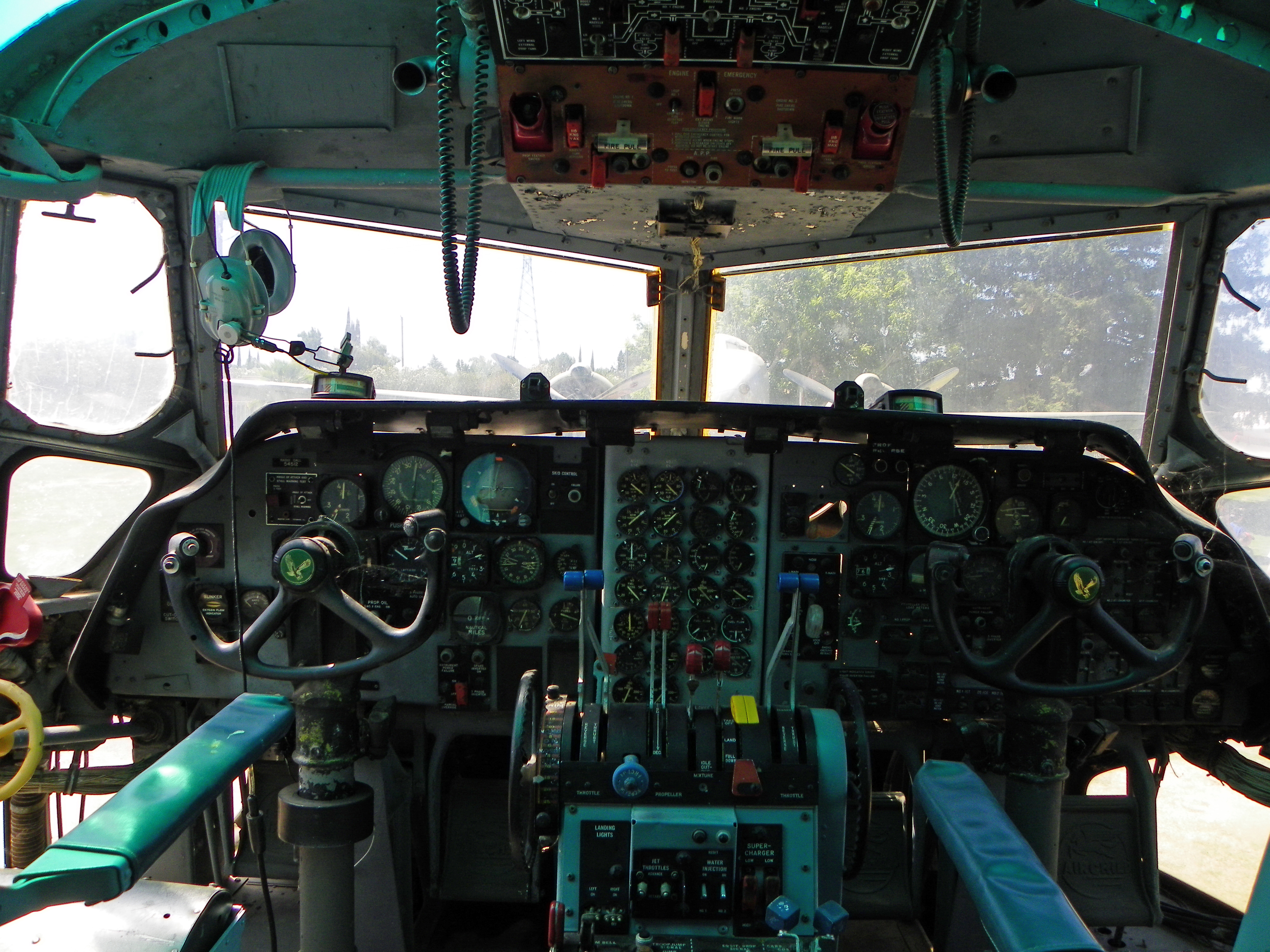
The cockpit of a C-123K Provider at the Castle Air Museum

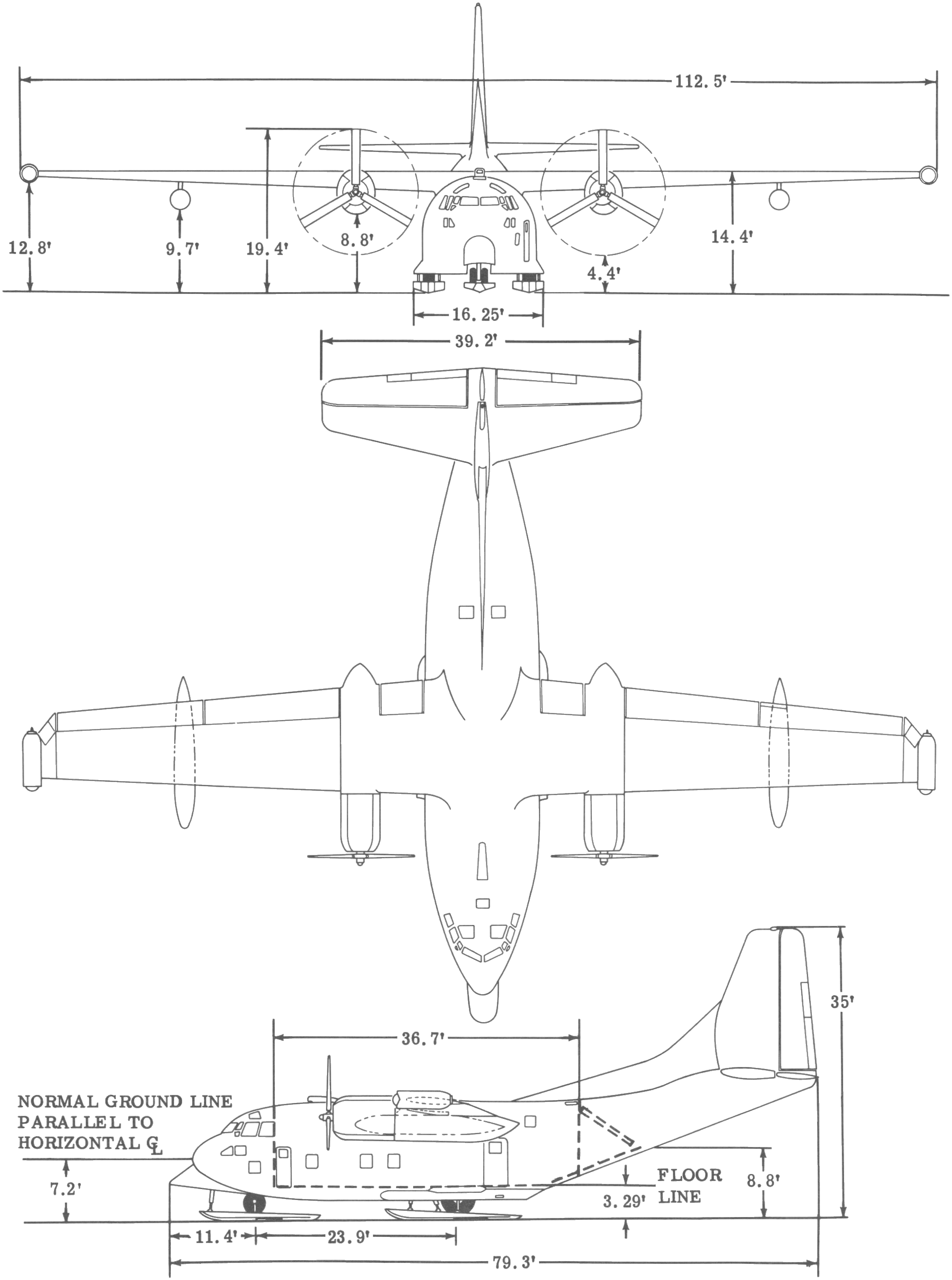
A 3-view line drawing of a Fairchild C-123J Provider

Chase XCG-20
Two prototype all-metal troop transport gliders built by Chase Aircraft, later designated the XG-20, one became the XC-123, the other the XC-123A.
Chase XC-123
Former XG-20 fitted with two 2,200 hp (1,600 kW) R-2800-23 engines.
Chase XC-123A
Former XG-20 fitted with four J47-GE-11 turbojets in pairs (of the type used by the B-36 and B-47) under wings.
C-123B
Production model based on the XC-123 with two 2,300 hp (1,700 kW) R-2800-99W engines with accommodation for 61 troops or 50 stretchers, five built by Chase and 302 build by Fairchild Aircraft.
UC-123B
C-123Bs modified for defoliation and crop destruction duties.
VC-123C
Executive transport version of the jet-powered XC-123A, not built.
Stroukoff YC-123D
One aircraft built by Stroukoff with boundary layer control system for improved STOL performance.
Stroukoff YC-123E
One aircraft built by Stroukoff with modified fin and rudder, modified fuselage bottom (called Pantobase) and pontoon floats to allow operation from water, sand, snow or ice.
YC-123H
Prototype with wide track undercarriage and two underwing J85 booster engines.
C-123J
C-123B with two wing tip mounted Fairchild J44-R-3 booster engines, 10 converted on the production line, plus one converted later for the CAA (later FAA) for Alaska operations.
C-123K
C-123Bs with two underwing J85 booster engines and larger wheels, 183 converted.
AC-123K/NC-123K
Two C-123Bs converted for armed nighttime surveillance with special sensors.
C-123L
Proposed STOL variant with T64 turboprop engines and a wide-track, large-wheel main landing gear – not proceeded with. (Fairchild Model M-541 Tactical Airlift Transport)
C-123T
Proposed upgrade for Royal Thai Air Force C-123Bs including installation of turboprop engines; cancelled after one prototype due to budgetary reasons.
HC-123B
USCG search and rescue variant
UC-123K
C-123Ks converted for Ranch Hand defoliation missions, 34 converted.
VC-123K
One C-123K converted as personal transport for General Westmoreland's use in Vietnam.
Stroukoff YC-134
One aircraft built by Stroukoff, as C-123B but fitted with boundary layer control system, tailplane endplates, redesigned landing gear with tandem main wheels. Later designated YC-134A when fitted with Pantobase landing gear.
YC-136
Proposed improved variant; cancelled before any aircraft built.
B.L.4
(Thai: บ.ล.๔) Royal Thai Armed Forces designation for the C-123B.
B.L.4A
(Thai: บ.ล.๔ก) Royal Thai Armed Forces designation for the C-123K.

== Operators ==
Brazil

- Brazilian Air Force – two resold to Varig

Cambodia

- Khmer Air Force - received 21 C-123Ks in 1973

Taiwan

- Republic of China Air Force

34th "Black Bat Squadron", 1962 to 1973
4 C-123K, retired in 1981

El Salvador

- Salvadoran Air Force - received three C-123Ks in 1982

Laos

- Royal Lao Air Force - received 10 in 1973
- Lao People's Liberation Army Air Force

Philippines

- Philippine Air Force - received 19 from 1973

Saudi Arabia

- Royal Saudi Air Force - Six C-123Bs acquired in 1957. Five returned to US in 1966–67.

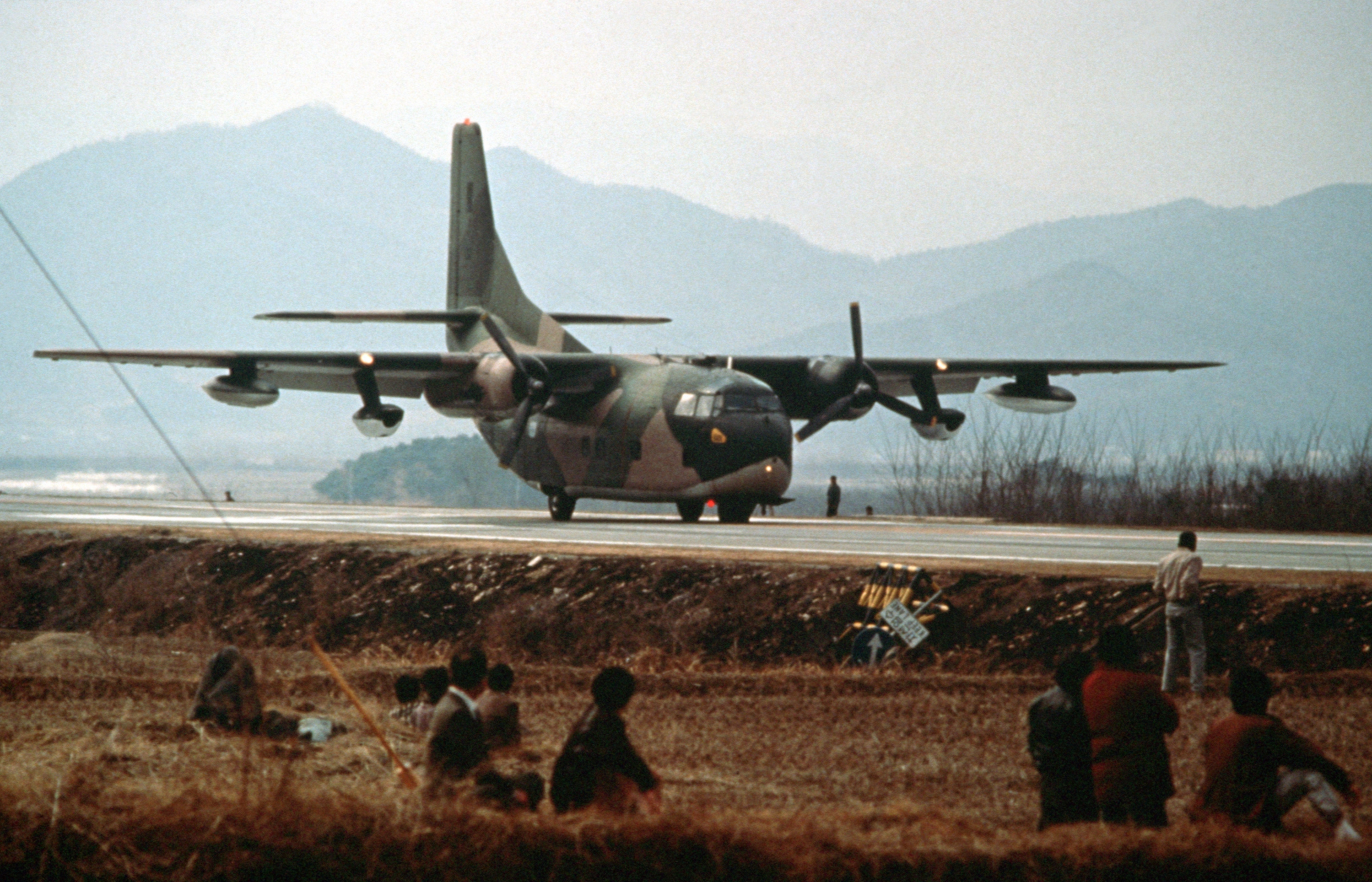
A South Korean C-123K in 1989.

South Korea

- Republic of Korea Air Force - C-123Ks from 1973 and C-123Js from 1977

South Vietnam

- Republic of Vietnam Air Force - 64 C-123Ks acquired 1971–72.

Thailand

- Royal Thai Air Force

United States

- United States Air Force
- United States Coast Guard

Venezuela

- Venezuelan Air Force - 18 C-123Bs acquired 1958, in use until 1983

== Accidents and incidents ==
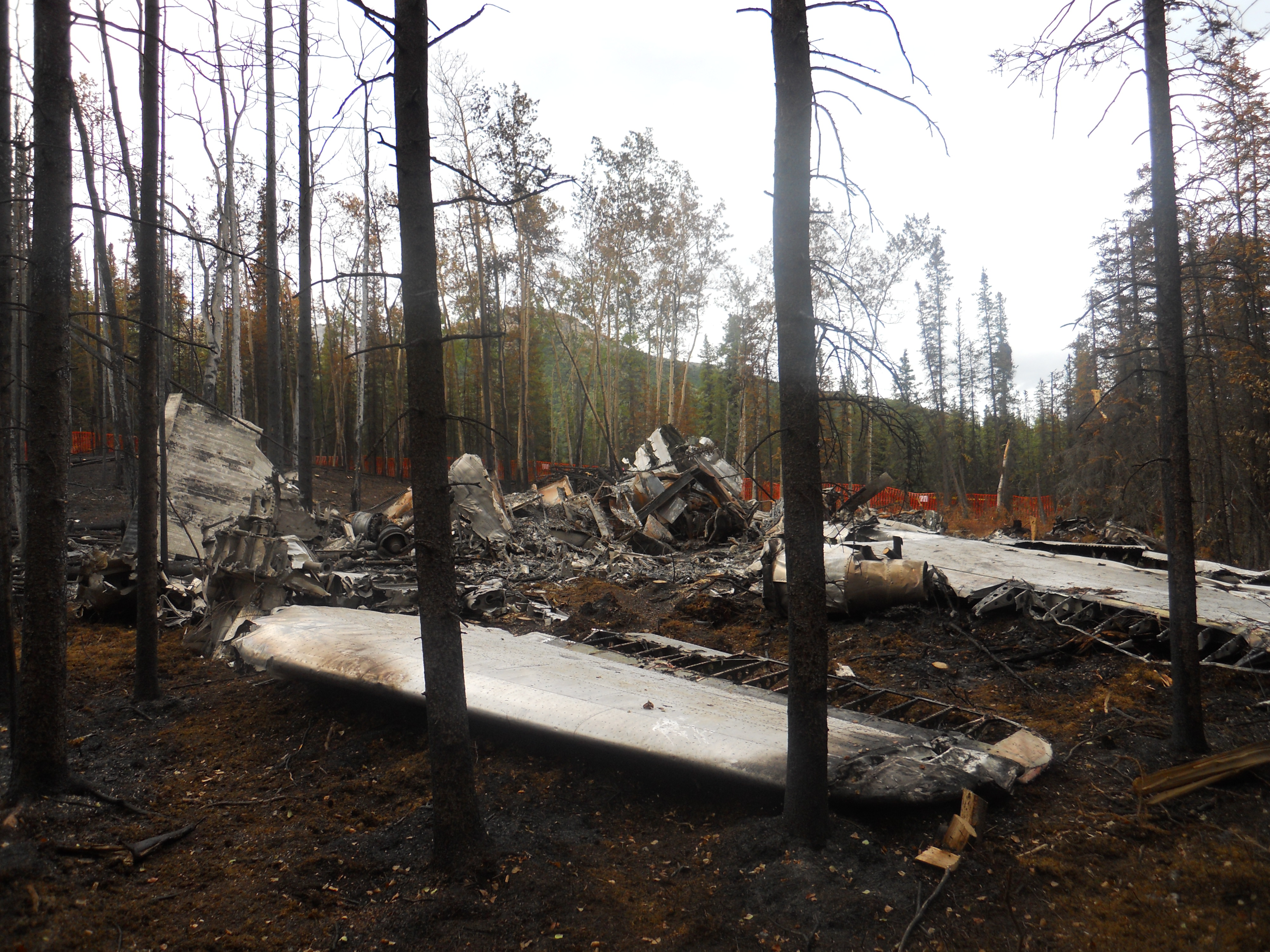
The crash site of the C-123 from Con Air, Mount Healy, Denali National Park, Alaska

- 9 October 1958: A C-123B Provider, AF Ser. No. 55-452, en route from Hill AFB, Utah to McChord AFB, Washington, with five USAF Thunderbirds flight crew and 14 maintenance personnel, flew through a flock of birds and crashed into a hillside six miles east of Payette, Idaho, just before 1830, killing all on board. This accident remains the worst loss-of-life in the Thunderbirds team history.
- 11 December 1964: A Republic of Vietnam Air Force C-123B (#55-4522) crashed into Sơn Trà Mountain shortly after takeoff from Da Nang Air Base killing all 38 on board.
- 11 December 1965: En route to Tuy Hoa Air Base, a USAF C-123 hit some trees on top of a ridge, causing it to enter a spin and crash. Four American officers and 81 South Vietnamese paratroopers were killed.
- 24 January 1966: A C-123K operated by the USAF (Registration 54-0702) lost power and crashed after take-off from An Khe, en route to Bong Son. The aircraft was transporting troops taking part in Operation Masher. The crew of four and 42 members of the 1st Air Cavalry Division were killed.
- 18 May 1966: C-123B Provider shot down in An Khe, South Vietnam.
- 27 November 1970: A C-123K #55-4574 on approach to Nha Trang Air Base in poor visibility crashed into terrain killing six U.S. crew and 73 South Vietnamese.
- 29 November 1970: A C-123K #54-0649 on approach to Cam Ranh Air Base crashed into terrain killing 42 on board.
- 27 December 1971: A C-123K en route from Udorn Royal Thai Air Force Base, to Xieng Lom located in northwestern Laos, was reportedly shot down by anti-aircraft fire approximately 35 km east northeast of Xieng Lom resulting in the loss of four crew members. In October, 1997, a Joint Task Force (JTF 98-IL) located the crash site. After three excavations (2017–2018) the remains of three crew members were identified.
- 16 October 1980: A UC-123K of the Air Force Reserves from Rickenbacker ANG Base crashed shortly after takeoff en route home from Fort Sill, Oklahoma to Rickenbacker ANGB, Ohio. Four crew members died on impact, the fifth died later.
- 6 February 1982: A South Korean Air Force C-123 crashed into a volcano while on approach to Jeju International Airport, killing all 53 people on board.
- 1 June 1982: A South Korean Air Force C-123 crashed into Mt. Choenggye, killing all 53 people on board.
- 1 August 2010: The aircraft used for flying scenes in the movie Con Air, C-123K, former AF Ser. No. 54-0709, FAA registration N709RR (cn: 20158), crashed in Denali National Park while performing a cargo flight for All West Freight. All three crew members died.

== Surviving aircraft ==
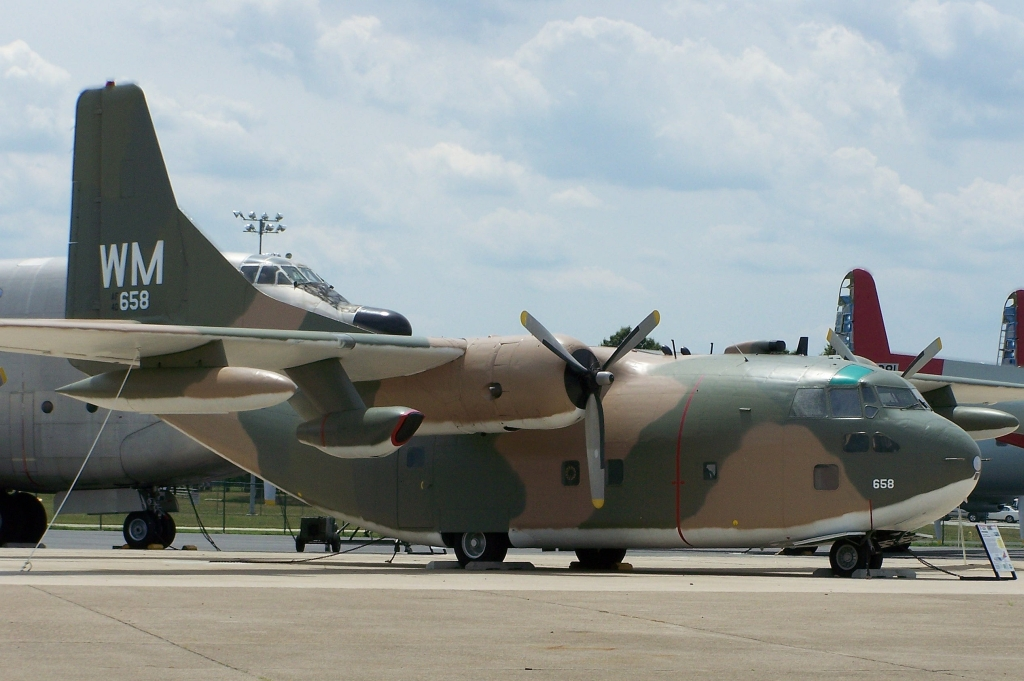
A C-123K on display at Air Mobility Command Museum at Dover AFB.

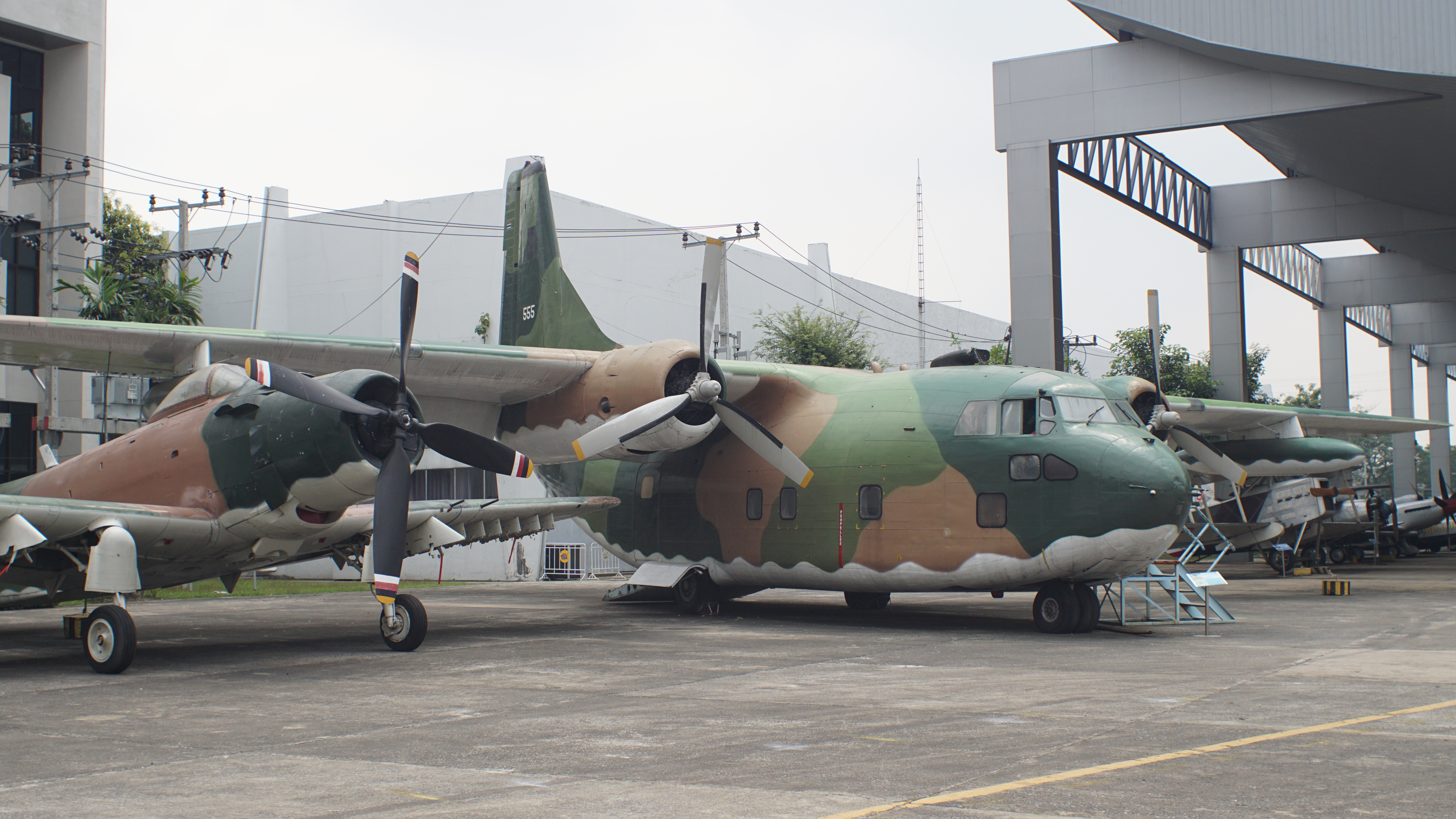
C-123B displays at the Royal Thai Air Force Museum

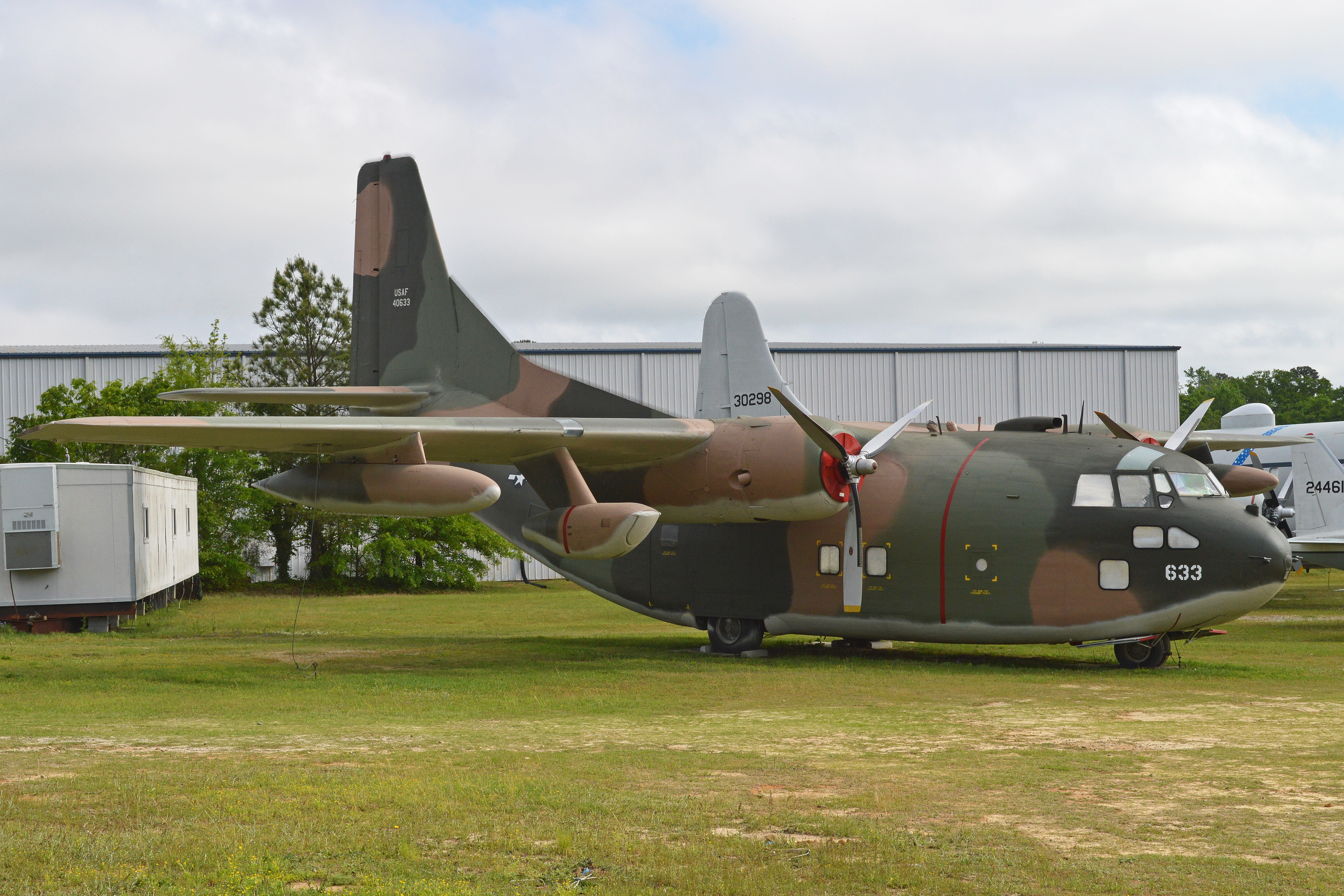
A C-123K display at the Museum of Aviation, Robins AFB

=== Costa Rica ===
- 54-0663 – El Avion restaurant in Hotel Costa Verde, Costa Rica has the twin of the CIA-operated aircraft downed by the Sandinista forces over Nicaragua in 1986. The aircraft has been converted into a bar. Formerly 437TAW and Ranch Hand aircraft

=== Thailand ===
- 54-0555 – Royal Thai Air Force Museum, Don Muang AFB.
- UNKNOWN – Caltex gas station, Bang Whua subdistrict, Bang Pakong district, Chachoengsao province, Thailand. Retired C-123B of the Royal Thai Air Force converted into a cafe called "Coffee 123", or more popularly known by the locals as the airplane cafe.

=== United States ===
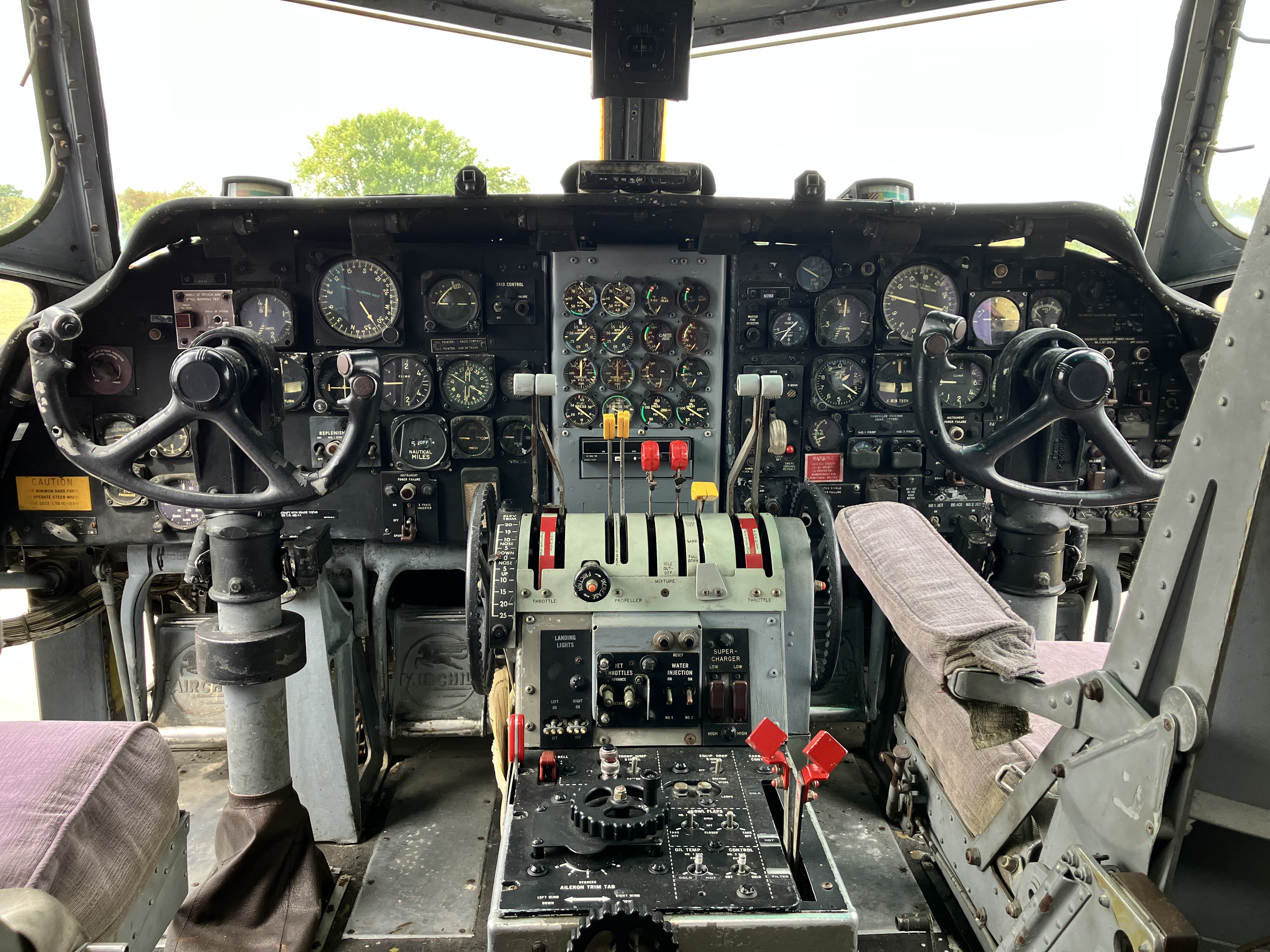
The cockpit of C-123K "Thunder Pig" at Air Heritage Aviation Museum

- 54-0580 – Pima Air and Space Museum (adjacent to Davis-Monthan AFB), Tucson, Arizona, C-123(B)K (On loan from US Forest Service)
- 54-0593 – Wilford Hall Medical Center, Lackland AFB, Texas
- 54-0609 – Fort Bragg, North Carolina, 82nd Airborne Division War Memorial Museum, C-123K
- 54-0610 – Hill Aerospace Museum, Hill AFB, Utah, C-123K (on loan from NMUSAF).
- 54-0612 – March ARB, California, March Field Air Museum, C-123K (on loan from NMUSAF).
- 54-0629 – McGuire AFB, Trenton, New Jersey
- 54-0633 – Robins AFB, Georgia, Museum of Aviation, C-123B (on loan from NMUSAF).
- 54-0658 – Dover AFB, Delaware, Air Mobility Command Museum, C-123K (on loan from NMUSAF).
- 54-0664 – Air Heritage Aviation Museum in Beaver Falls, Pennsylvania; this museum's C-123K, nicknamed "Thunder Pig", is operational and available for air shows.
- 54-0674 – Air America Foundation, Inc., owns a C-123K, housed at Space Coast Regional Airport, Titusville, Florida.
- 54-0683 – Air Force Flight Test Museum, California, C-123K sitting alongside a C-119 Flying Boxcar on an unused runway south of the air base. This aircraft was auctioned off in early 2016.
- 54-0692 – SpringHill Camps, Evart, Michigan. This C-123K has been repurposed as a camp cabin for year-round use.
- 54-0695 – Mid-America Transportation and Aviation Museum, Sioux City, Iowa.
- 55-4507 – Travis AFB, California, Travis Air Museum, C-123K (on loan from NMUSAF).
- 55-4512 – Castle Airport (former Castle AFB), California, Castle Air Museum, C-123K (on loan from NMUSAF).
- 56-4361 – Wendover Airport, Wendover, Utah, C-123K
- 56-4362 – National Museum of the United States Air Force, Wright-Patterson AFB, Ohio, C-123K (Patches, former Ranch Hand aircraft).

Several other examples of C-123s remain in an active flying status, operated by private owners in the United States or by various air forces worldwide.

== Specifications (C-123K Provider) ==
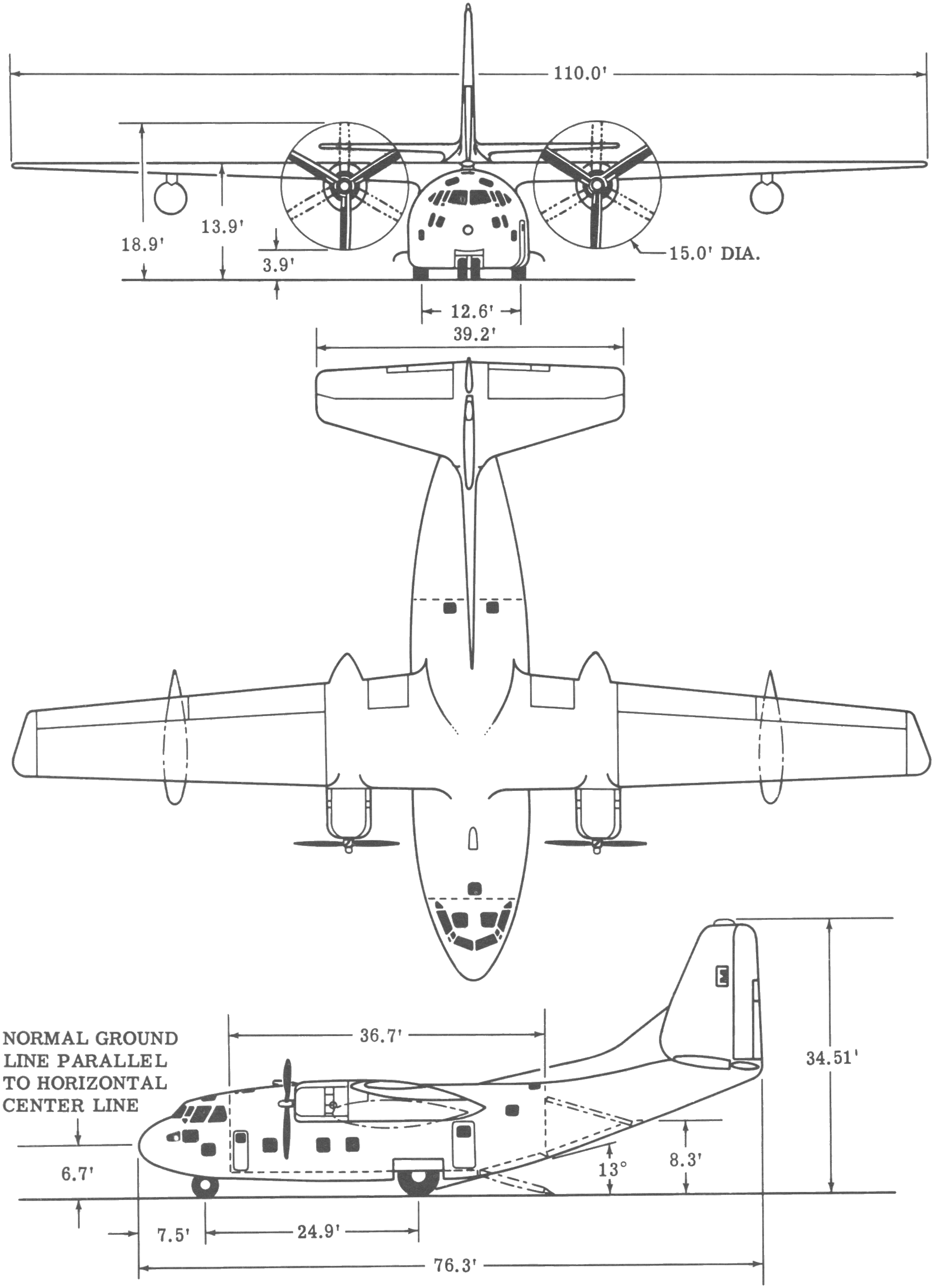
3-view line drawing of the Fairchild C-123B Provider

Data from The Observer's Book of Basic Aircraft: Military (dimensions), Jane's All The World's Aircraft 1969–70 (weights and performance)

General characteristics

- Crew: 4
- Capacity: 60 passengers, 50 litters, or 24,000 pounds (11,000 kg) of cargo
- Length: 76 ft 3 in (23.24 m)
- Wingspan: 110 ft 0 in (33.53 m)
- Height: 34 ft 1 in (10.39 m)
- Wing area: 1,223 sq ft (113.6 m^{2})
- Airfoil: NACA 23017
- Empty weight: 35,366 lb (16,042 kg)
- Gross weight: 51,576 lb (23,394 kg)
- Max takeoff weight: 60,000 lb (27,216 kg)
- Fuel capacity: 1,462 US gal (1,217 imp gal; 5,530 L) internal + 2x 450 US gal (370 imp gal; 1,700 L) underwing drop-tanks
- Powerplant: 2 × Pratt & Whitney R-2800-99W Double Wasp 18-cylinder air-cooled radial piston engines, 2,500 hp (1,900 kW) each
- Powerplant: 2 × General Electric J85-GE-17 turbojet engines, 2,850 lbf (12.7 kN) thrust each
- Propellers: 3-bladed Hamilton Standard constant-speed fully feathering reversible-pitch propellers

Performance

- Maximum speed: 228 mph (367 km/h, 198 kn) at 10,000 ft (3,048 m)
- Cruise speed: 173 mph (278 km/h, 150 kn) maximum at 10,000 ft (3,048 m)
- Stall speed: 95 mph (153 km/h, 83 kn) flaps and undercarriage down
- Range: 1,035 mi (1,666 km, 899 nmi) with maximum payload
- Ferry range: 3,280 mi (5,280 km, 2,850 nmi) with 2x 500 US gal (420 imp gal; 1,900 L) "Benson" auxiliary tanks
- Service ceiling: 21,100 ft (6,400 m) with one engine inoperative
- Rate of climb: 1,220 ft/min (6.2 m/s) at sea level with one engine inoperative
- Take-off run: 1,167 ft (356 m)
- Take-off distance to 50 ft (15 m): 1,809 ft (551 m)
- Landing distance from 50 ft (15 m): 1,800 ft (549 m)

== Notable appearances in media ==
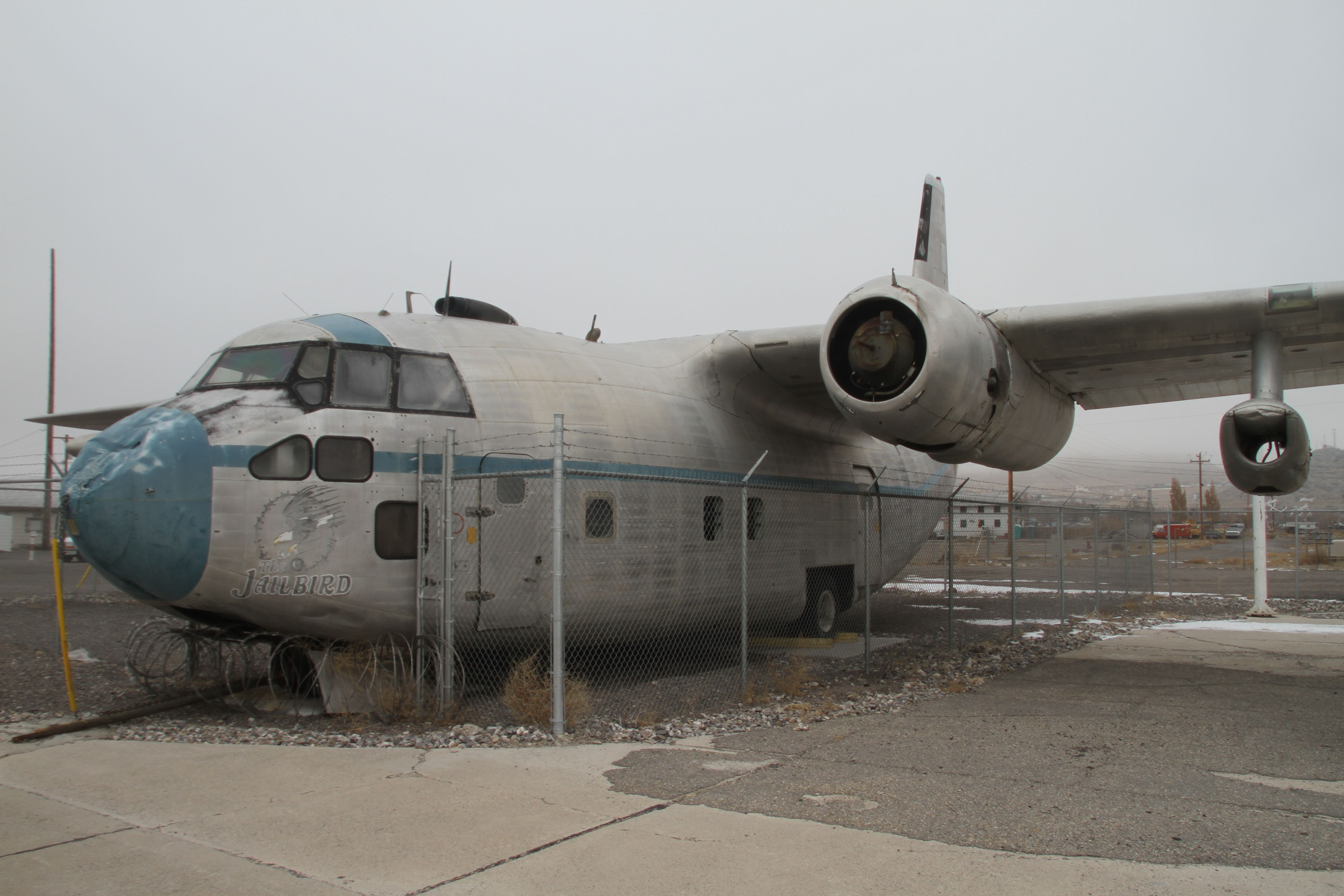
The Fairchild C-123 used for static and taxi scenes in Con Air (1997), at Wendover Airfield, 2011

A C-123K (54-709), N709RR, since destroyed in a crash in 2010, was prominently featured in the action film Con Air (1997). Other C-123s appeared in Air America (1990), Outbreak (1995), Operation Dumbo Drop (1995) and American Made (2017), none of which were used in Operation Ranch Hand.

== See also ==
Related development

- Chase XCG-20 – Transport glider, U.S. Air Force, 1950
- Chase XC-123A – Experimental transport aircraft
- Stroukoff YC-134 – 1956 prototype airlifter model

Aircraft of comparable role, configuration, and era

- Aeritalia G.222 – 1970 airlifter family by Aeritalia
- Antonov An-8 – Soviet transport aircraft
- Blackburn Beverley – British heavy transport aircraft, 1950

Related lists

- List of military aircraft of the United States
