= Air Heritage Aviation Museum =

American aviation museum in Pennsylvania

- Location within Pennsylvania
- Established: 1986
- Location: 35 Piper St #1043, Beaver Falls, Pennsylvania
- Coordinates: 40°46′37″N 80°23′24″W
- Type: Aviation museum
- Website: airheritage.org

Air Heritage Aviation Museum is an aviation museum and aircraft restoration facility in Beaver County, Pennsylvania near Beaver Falls. The museum has multiple aircraft on display, as well as a C-123 and C-47 which are airworthy and are taken to airshows.

== History ==
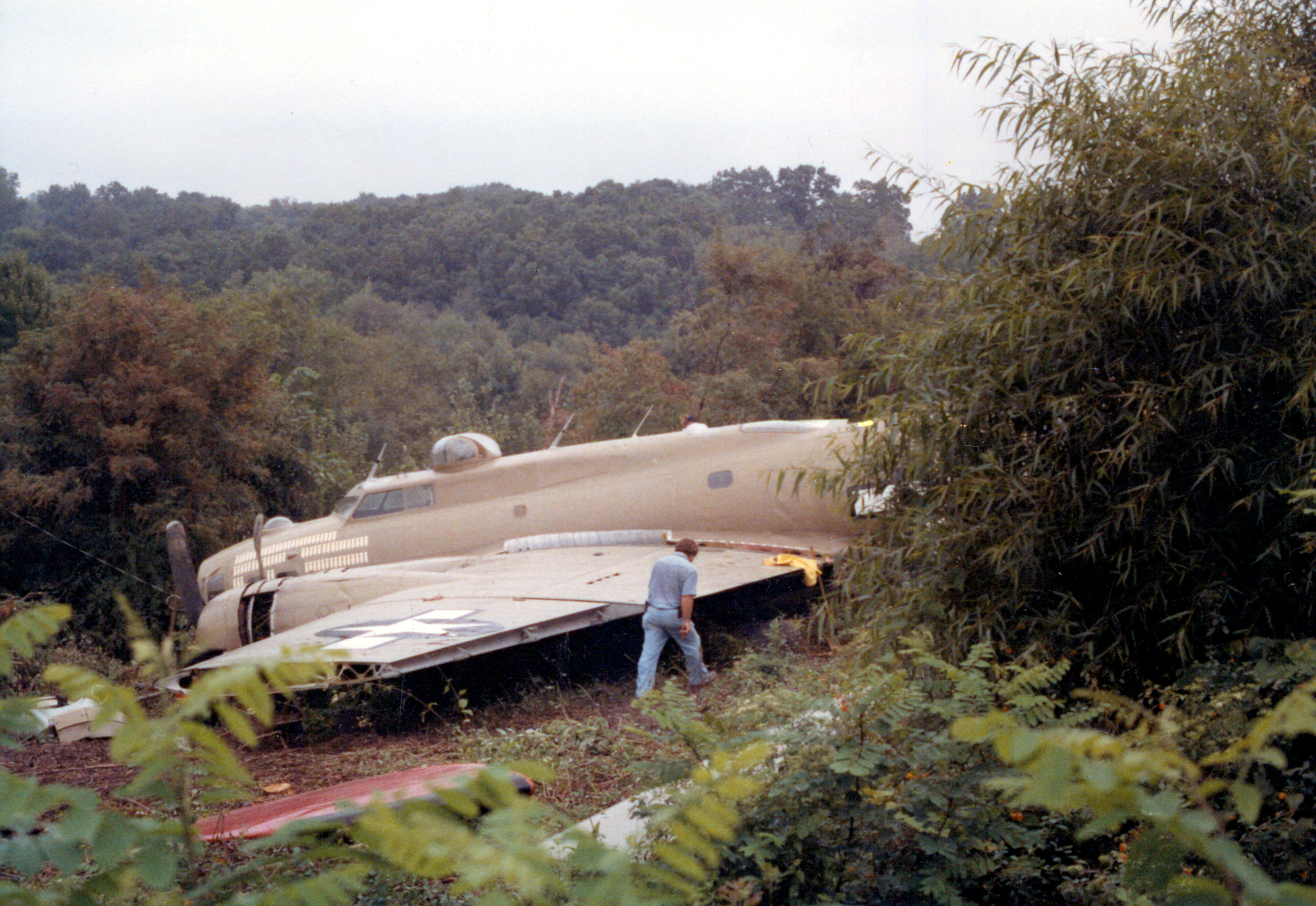
Nine-O-Nine after the August 1987 accident

Air Heritage was founded in April 1983 as Air Heritage of Western Pennsylvania and selected Beaver County Airport for its headquarters. In June 1987 Air Heritage acquired and restored a L-21B Super Cub retrieved from the Pennsylvania Federal Surplus Property Program. Beginning in August 1987 Air Heritage aided in the repair and restoration of B-17 Nine-O-Nine after it went off the end of the runway at Beaver County Airport. In April 1990 David Tallichet's company Military Aircraft Restoration Corporation donated $200,000 to Air Heritage for the construction of a new hangar. In exchange, Air Heritage offered to restore some of MARC's aircraft and give them a twenty-year lease on the hangar.

In May 1994 MARC agreed to lease a C-123K Provider to Air Heritage if the aircraft was recovered from Davis Monthan Air Force Base in Tucson, Arizona. The agreement was that revenue the aircraft generated at airshows would be split evenly between MARC, Air Heritage, and maintenance costs. A team from Air Heritage made the necessary repairs and flew the aircraft back to Beaver County Airport where restoration continued. In 1995 Air Heritage began restoration on a B-25 Mitchell for the United States Navy. That same year, Air Heritage finished restoration of the C-123K and flew it to its first airshow under the designation "Thunder Pig." The name is a reference to the nickname the 911th Airlift Wing gave to the C-123K while they were in service. In 1998 restoration on the B-25 was completed and it was delivered to the National Naval Aviation Museum in Pensacola, Florida. In December 2002 Air Heritage acquired an F-24 C8C for restoration.

In August 2007 David Tallichet passed away and all MARC aircraft in the Air Heritage hangar were transferred out. In 2008 Air Heritage acquired and an F-15A Eagle from Robins Air Force Base and a Jet Provost T3 from a private family for static display. That same year Air Heritage acquired a Funk Model B for restoration. In 2010 MARC's lease on the Air Heritage hangar expired leaving Air Heritage the sole owner. In 2012 Air Heritage acquired an F-4C Phantom II through the Federal Surplus Program for static display. In 2013 Air Heritage received a C-47B Skytrain from the Vietnam Huey Pilot's Association in exchange for cash and an OV-1 Mohawk. In March 2016 Air Heritage became the sole owner of the C-123K "Thunder Pig" after the contract with MARC expired without them choosing to utilize their buy-back option. At around the same time the Thunder Pig was used in the filming of the movie American Made. The aircraft was also used in filming of X-Men: Days of Future Past and television series Boot Camp and Believe.

== Aircraft ==
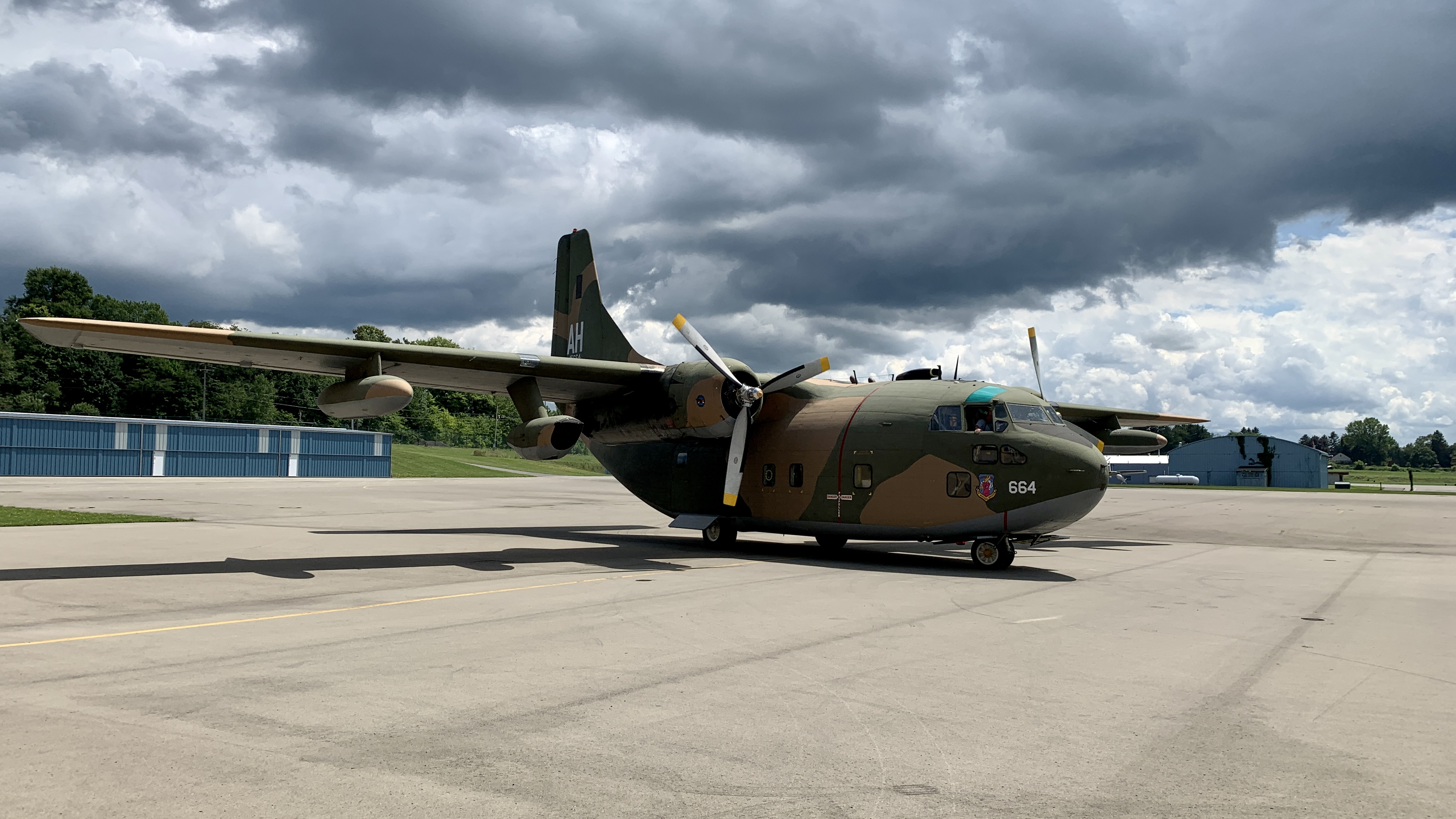
The "Thunder Pig" at Beaver County Airport

=== Operational Aircraft ===
- Cessna 150
- Douglas C-47B Skytrain "Luck of the Irish"
- Fairchild C-123K Provider "Thunder Pig"
- Piper L-21B Super Cub

=== Static Display ===
- BAC Jet Provost T3
- McDonnell Douglas F-15A Eagle
- McDonnell Douglas F-4C Phantom II
- North American T-28 Trojan
- Short C-23B Sherpa

=== Under Restoration ===
- Fairchild 24 C8C "Maggie's Pride"
- Funk Model B-75-L

== See also ==
- List of aviation museums
