= Low light level television =

Electronic light sensing device sensitive to wavelengths into the near infrared

Low light level television (LLLTV) is a type of electronic sensing device, usually a CCD camera sensitive to wavelengths above the normal "visible" (0.4 to 0.7 micrometre) wavelengths, and into the short-wavelength infrared (SWIR) - usually to about 1.0 to 1.1 micrometres. This allows viewing of objects in extremely low light levels, where they would not be seen by the naked eye. LLLTVs tend to be more affordable than infrared cameras, which typically cover ranges from 3 to 5 μm (mid-wavelength infrared or MWIR) or 8 to 12 μm (long-wavelength infrared or LWIR).

== See also ==
- Night vision
- Thermographic camera
