= SpringHill Camps =

Christian ministry

SpringHill Camps (born 1969) is an American Christian youth camp founded in Evart, Michigan.

== Background ==
The SpringHill Camp ministry now has sites in five states with overnight locations in Evart, Michigan and in Seymour, Indiana and various day camps at local churches in Michigan, Indiana, Illinois, Ohio, and Wisconsin. The camp was founded in 1969 by a coalition of Evangelical Free Churches in the American Midwest. The first director of the camp was Enoch Olson. The camp currently has over 40,000 campers a year. Current President is Michael Perry. The Camp has a Christian focus.
