= Tang-e Daf, Hormozgan =

Tang-e Daf تنگ دف
- Village
- Location within Iran
- Coordinates: 26°05′17″N 58°50′01″E
- Country: Iran
- Province: Hormozgan
- County: Jask
- Bakhsh: Lirdaf
- Rural District: Surak

Population (2006)
  - Total: 30
- Time zone: UTC+3:30 (IRST)
  - Summer (DST): UTC+4:30 (IRDT)

Tang-e Daf (Persian: تنگ دف; also known as Tankedaf) is a village in Surak Rural District, Lirdaf District, Jask County, Hormozgan Province, Iran. As of the 2006 census, its population was 30, spread over 9 families.
