= Jagin-e Bala =

Jagin-e Bala جگين بالا
- Village
- Location within Iran
- Coordinates: 25°59′13″N 58°01′27″E
- Country: Iran
- Province: Hormozgan
- County: Jask
- Bakhsh: Central
- Rural District: Gabrik

Population (2006)
  - Total: 170
- Time zone: UTC+3:30 (IRST)
  - Summer (DST): UTC+4:30 (IRDT)

Jagin-e Bala (Persian: جگين بالا, also Romanized as Jagīn-e Bālā; also known as Jagin) is a village in Gabrik Rural District, in the Central District of Jask County, Hormozgan Province, Iran. At the 2006 census, its population was 170, in 46 families.
