= Shadini Zehi =

Shadini Zehi شاديني زهي
- Village
- Location within Iran
- Coordinates: 26°02′39″N 58°45′37″E
- Country: Iran
- Province: Hormozgan
- County: Jask
- Bakhsh: Lirdaf
- Rural District: Surak

Population (2006)
  - Total: 25
- Time zone: UTC+3:30 (IRST)
  - Summer (DST): UTC+4:30 (IRDT)

Shadini Zehi (Persian: شاديني زهي, also Romanized as Shādīnī Zehī; also known as Shādenīzey, Shādīn Zehī, and Shād Nīzī) is a village in Surak Rural District, Lirdaf District, Jask County, Hormozgan Province, Iran. At the 2006 census, its population was 25, in six families.
