= Dival =

Dival (Persian: ديول) may refer to:

- Dival, Afghanistan
- Dival, Hormozgan, Iran
- Dival, Sistan and Baluchestan, Iran
