= Shayhowli =

Shayhowli شيهولي
- Village
- Location within Iran
- Coordinates: 25°42′00″N 58°55′00″E
- Country: Iran
- Province: Hormozgan
- County: Jask
- Bakhsh: Lirdaf
- Rural District: Piveshk

Population (2006)
  - Total: 245
- Time zone: UTC+3:30 (IRST)
  - Summer (DST): UTC+4:30 (IRDT)

Shayhowli (Persian: شيهولي, also Romanized as Shayhowlī; also known as Shayowlī) is a village in Piveshk Rural District, Lirdaf District, Jask County, Hormozgan Province, Iran. At the 2006 census, its population was 245, in 55 families.
