= Moshkuhi =

Moshkuhi مشكوهي
- Village
- Location within Iran
- Coordinates: 25°29′37″N 59°01′07″E
- Country: Iran
- Province: Hormozgan
- County: Jask
- Bakhsh: Lirdaf
- Rural District: Piveshk

Population (2006)
  - Total: 62
- Time zone: UTC+3:30 (IRST)
  - Summer (DST): UTC+4:30 (IRDT)

Moshkuhi (Persian: مشكوهي, also Romanized as Moshkūhī; also known as Mushkūhī) is a village in Piveshk Rural District, Lirdaf District, Jask County, Hormozgan Province, Iran. At the 2006 census, its population was 62, in 20 families.
