= Nowruz Kar =

Nowruz Kar نوروزكار
- Village
- Location within Iran
- Coordinates: 25°44′55″N 58°26′34″E
- Country: Iran
- Province: Hormozgan
- County: Jask
- Bakhsh: Central
- Rural District: Gabrik

Population (2006)
  - Total: 119
- Time zone: UTC+3:30 (IRST)
  - Summer (DST): UTC+4:30 (IRDT)

Nowruz Kar (Persian: نوروزكار, also Romanized as Nowrūz Kār) is a village in Gabrik Rural District, in the Central District of Jask County, Hormozgan Province, Iran. At the 2006 census, its population was 119, in 33 families.
