= Daski, Lirdaf =

Daski دسكي
- Village
- Country: Iran
- Province: Hormozgan
- County: Jask
- Bakhsh: Lirdaf
- Rural District: Surak

Population (2006)
  - Total: 16
- Time zone: UTC+3:30 (IRST)
  - Summer (DST): UTC+4:30 (IRDT)

Daski (Persian: دسكي, also Romanized as Daskī) is a village in Surak Rural District, Lirdaf District, Jask County, Hormozgan Province, Iran. According to the 2006 census, its population was 16, in 4 families.
