= Shemshi =

Shemshi شمشي
- Village
- Location within Iran
- Coordinates: 25°39′05″N 58°49′26″E
- Country: Iran
- Province: Hormozgan
- County: Jask
- Bakhsh: Lirdaf
- Rural District: Surak

Population (2006)
  - Total: 669
- Time zone: UTC+3:30 (IRST)
  - Summer (DST): UTC+4:30 (IRDT)

Shemshi (Persian: شمشي, also Romanized as Shemshī; also known as Shemsī) is a village in Surak Rural District, Lirdaf District, Jask County, Hormozgan Province, Iran. At the 2006 census, its population was 669, in 163 families.
