= Kontaki =

Kontaki كنتاكي
- Village
- Location within Iran
- Coordinates: 25°43′22″N 58°27′40″E
- Country: Iran
- Province: Hormozgan
- County: Jask
- Bakhsh: Central
- Rural District: Gabrik

Population (2006)
  - Total: 150
- Time zone: UTC+3:30 (IRST)
  - Summer (DST): UTC+4:30 (IRDT)

Kontaki (Persian: كنتاكي, also Romanized as Kontakī; also known as Kontāgī) is a village in Gabrik Rural District, in the Central District of Jask County, Hormozgan Province, Iran. At the 2006 census, its population was 150, in 38 families.
