= Hushdan =

Hushdan هوشدان
- Village
- Location within Iran
- Coordinates: 25°43′04″N 57°55′38″E
- Country: Iran
- Province: Hormozgan
- County: Jask
- Bakhsh: Central
- Rural District: Gabrik

Population (2006)
  - Total: 248
- Time zone: UTC+3:30 (IRST)
  - Summer (DST): UTC+4:30 (IRDT)

Hushdan (Persian: هوشدان, also Romanized as Hūshdān and Hooshdan; also known as Chāhrū) is a village in Gabrik Rural District, in the Central District of Jask County, Hormozgan Province, Iran. At the 2006 census, its population was 248, in 43 families.
