= Jahelu, Hormozgan =

Jahelu جهلو
- Village
- Location within Iran
- Coordinates: 25°35′21″N 59°05′42″E
- Country: Iran
- Province: Hormozgan
- County: Jask
- Bakhsh: Lirdaf
- Rural District: Piveshk

Population (2006)
  - Total: 222
- Time zone: UTC+3:30 (IRST)
  - Summer (DST): UTC+4:30 (IRDT)

Jahelu (Persian: جهلو, also Romanized as Jāhelū; also known as Jahlū, Johlū, and Joholū) is a village in Piveshk Rural District, Lirdaf District, Jask County, Hormozgan Province, Iran. At the 2006 census, its population was 222, in 63 families.
