= Dizu =

Dizu ديزو
- Village
- Country: Iran
- Province: Hormozgan
- County: Jask
- Bakhsh: Central
- Rural District: Gabrik

Population (2006)
  - Total: 13
- Time zone: UTC+3:30 (IRST)
  - Summer (DST): UTC+4:30 (IRDT)

Dizu (Persian: ديزو, also Romanized as Dīzū) is a village in Gabrik Rural District, in the Central District of Jask County, Hormozgan Province, Iran. At the 2006 census, its population was 13, in 4 families.
