= Baridi =

Baridi بريدي
- Village
- Location within Iran
- Coordinates: 26°01′04″N 58°41′32″E
- Country: Iran
- Province: Hormozgan
- County: Jask
- Bakhsh: Lirdaf
- Rural District: Surak

Population (2006)
  - Total: 40
- Time zone: UTC+3:30 (IRST)
  - Summer (DST): UTC+4:30 (IRDT)

Baridi (Persian: بريدي, also Romanized as Barīdī) is a village in Surak Rural District, Lirdaf District, Jask County, Hormozgan Province, Iran. At the 2006 census, its population was 40, in 10 families.
