= Sirmach =

Sirmach سيرمچ
- Village
- Location within Iran
- Coordinates: 25°41′00″N 58°17′00″E
- Country: Iran
- Province: Hormozgan
- County: Jask
- Bakhsh: Central
- Rural District: Gabrik

Population (2006)
  - Total: 282
- Time zone: UTC+3:30 (IRST)
  - Summer (DST): UTC+4:30 (IRDT)

Sirmach (Persian: سيرمچ, also Romanized as Sīrmach, Sīramoh, and Siramch; also known as Rāpch and Sīrāmach) is a village in Gabrik Rural District, in the Central District of Jask County, Hormozgan Province, Iran. At the 2006 census, its population was 282, in 57 families.

The village is located near a tidal inlet known as Khowr Rapch or Lahūr-e Rāpch, a large and shallow inlet with a maximum depth of 8m, the mouth of which is flanked by sand hills. The port of Jask, Iran is 204.7 km to the west and Chahbahar, 158.1 km to the east.

The nearby deserted village of Galak has been identified by some as the ancient Hellenistic port of Rhogana.
