= Sar Tit Kan =

Sar Tit Kan سرتيتكن
- Village
- Location within Iran
- Coordinates: 25°55′42″N 58°12′31″E
- Country: Iran
- Province: Hormozgan
- County: Jask
- Bakhsh: Central
- Rural District: Gabrik

Population (2006)
  - Total: 10
- Time zone: UTC+3:30 (IRST)
  - Summer (DST): UTC+4:30 (IRDT)

Sar Tit Kan (Persian: سرتيتكن, also Romanized as Sar Tīt Kan) is a village in Gabrik Rural District, in the Central District of Jask County, Hormozgan Province, Iran. At the 2006 census, its population was 10, in 4 families.
