= Taladar-e Nakhlestan =

Taladar-e Nakhlestan طلادر نخلستان
- Village
- Location within Iran
- Coordinates: 25°27′15″N 59°00′24″E
- Country: Iran
- Province: Hormozgan
- County: Jask
- Bakhsh: Lirdaf
- Rural District: Piveshk

Population (2006)
  - Total: 50
- Time zone: UTC+3:30 (IRST)
  - Summer (DST): UTC+4:30 (IRDT)

Taladar-e Nakhlestan (Persian: طلادر نخلستان, also Romanized as Ţalādar-e Nakhlestān; also known as Ţalādar) is a village in Piveshk Rural District, Lirdaf District, Jask County, Hormozgan Province, Iran. At the 2006 census, its population was 50, in 11 families.
