= Shahrak-e Gabrik =

Shahrak-e Gabrik شهرك گابريك
- Village
- Location within Iran
- Coordinates: 25°43′16″N 58°27′41″E
- Country: Iran
- Province: Hormozgan
- County: Jask
- Bakhsh: Central
- Rural District: Gabrik

Population (2006)
  - Total: 18
- Time zone: UTC+3:30 (IRST)
  - Summer (DST): UTC+4:30 (IRDT)

Shahrak-e Gabrik (Persian: شهرك گابريك, also Romanized as Shahrak-e Gābrīk; also known as Gabrīg and Gābrīk) is a village in Gabrik Rural District, in the Central District of Jask County, Hormozgan province, Iran. At the 2006 census, its population was 18, in 6 families.
