= Karbala, Iran =

Karbala كربلا
- Village
- Location within Iran
- Coordinates: 25°43′37″N 58°51′11″E
- Country: Iran
- Province: Hormozgan
- County: Jask
- Bakhsh: Lirdaf
- Rural District: Piveshk

Population (2006)
  - Total: 226
- Time zone: UTC+3:30 (IRST)
  - Summer (DST): UTC+4:30 (IRDT)

Karbala (Persian: كربلا, also Romanized as Karbalā) is a village in Piveshk Rural District, Lirdaf District, Jask County, Hormozgan Province, Iran. At the 2006 census, its population was 226, in 46 families.

== See also ==
- Karbala, the city in Iraq
