= ABD =

ABD, or abd, may refer to:

== Businesses and organizations ==
- ABD (TV station), Darwin, Northern Territory, Australia
- ABD Insurance & Financial, California, US
- Alliance of British Drivers, a British not-for-profit membership organisation that promotes the interests and concerns of drivers
- Apprentice Boys of Derry, Protestant fraternal organization based in Northern Ireland

== Medicine ==
- Abdomen, the part of the body between the chest and pelvis
- Acute behavioural disturbance, an umbrella diagnosis for behavior requiring chemical restraint

== Places ==
=== Transport infrastructure ===
- Abadan Ayatollah Jami International Airport in Khuzestan Province, Iran (IATA airport code ABD)
- Aberdeen railway station, Scotland, UK (National Rail code "ABD")

=== Other places ===
- Abd, Iran, a village in Surak Rural District
- Mohammadabad, Jask (also ‘Abd), a village in Hormozgan Province, Iran
- Anza-Borego Desert, part of California's Colorado Desert
- Aberdeenshire (historic), registration county of Scotland (Chapman code:ABD)

== Other uses ==
- Abd (Arabic), a word ('slave/servant' or 'to worship') often in names
- AB de Villiers (b. 1984), former international cricketer
- A Bold Dream, or ABD, a South Korean music label owned by Hybe Corporation
- All but dissertation, a stage in a higher degree, most commonly used in the US
- Anchor Bible Dictionary
- Assisted braking device, a mechanical belaying device in climbing
- Av Beit Din, Sanhedrin chief justice in antiquity
- Manide language, Philippines (ISO 639-3 code "abd")
