= Vanak, Hormozgan =

Vanak ونك
- Village
- Location within Iran
- Coordinates: 25°32′17″N 58°52′19″E
- Country: Iran
- Province: Hormozgan
- County: Jask
- Bakhsh: Lirdaf
- Rural District: Piveshk

Population (2006)
  - Total: 414
- Time zone: UTC+3:30 (IRST)
  - Summer (DST): UTC+4:30 (IRDT)

Vanak (Persian: ونك) is a village in Piveshk Rural District, Lirdaf District, Jask County, Hormozgan Province, Iran 450 km from Bandar Abbas (by car). At the 2006 census, its population was 414, in 85 families.
