= Jomehi =

Jomehi جمعه اي
- Village
- Location within Iran
- Coordinates: 25°44′51″N 58°52′42″E
- Country: Iran
- Province: Hormozgan
- County: Jask
- Bakhsh: Lirdaf
- Rural District: Piveshk

Population (2006)
  - Total: 89
- Time zone: UTC+3:30 (IRST)
  - Summer (DST): UTC+4:30 (IRDT)

Jomehi (Persian: جمعه اي, also Romanized as Jom‘eh’ī; also known as Jomne‘ī) is a village in Piveshk Rural District, Lirdaf District, Jask County, Hormozgan Province, Iran. At the 2006 census, its population was 89, in 22 families.
