= Petrowki =

Petrowki پتركي
- Village
- Location within Iran
- Coordinates: 25°41′07″N 58°53′01″E
- Country: Iran
- Province: Hormozgan
- County: Jask
- Bakhsh: Lirdaf
- Rural District: Piveshk

Population (2006)
  - Total: 198
- Time zone: UTC+3:30 (IRST)
  - Summer (DST): UTC+4:30 (IRDT)

Petrowki (Persian: پتركي, also Romanized as Petrowkī) is a village in Piveshk Rural District, Lirdaf District, Jask County, Hormozgan Province, Iran. At the 2006 census, its population was 198, in 43 families.
