= Gashmi =

Gashmi گشمي
- Village
- Location within Iran
- Coordinates: 25°37′00″N 58°40′56″E
- Country: Iran
- Province: Hormozgan
- County: Jask
- Bakhsh: Lirdaf
- Rural District: Surak

Population (2006)
  - Total: 122
- Time zone: UTC+3:30 (IRST)
  - Summer (DST): UTC+4:30 (IRDT)

Gashmi (Persian: گشمي, also Romanized as Gashmī) is a village in Surak Rural District, Lirdaf District, Jask County, Hormozgan Province, Iran. At the 2006 census, its population was 122, in 29 families.
