= Tujidar =

Tujidar توجيدر
- Village
- Location within Iran
- Coordinates: 26°06′02″N 58°50′47″E
- Country: Iran
- Province: Hormozgan
- County: Jask
- Bakhsh: Lirdaf
- Rural District: Surak

Population (2006)
  - Total: 42
- Time zone: UTC+3:30 (IRST)
  - Summer (DST): UTC+4:30 (IRDT)

Tujidar (Persian: توجيدر, also Romanized as Tūjīdar) is a village in Surak Rural District, Lirdaf District, Jask County, Hormozgan Province, Iran. At the 2006 census, its population was 42, in 11 families.
