= Surgalm =

Surgalm سورگلم
- Village
- Location within Iran
- Coordinates: 25°39′21″N 58°08′32″E
- Country: Iran
- Province: Hormozgan
- County: Jask
- Bakhsh: Central
- Rural District: Gabrik

Population (2006)
  - Total: 437
- Time zone: UTC+3:30 (IRST)
  - Summer (DST): UTC+4:30 (IRDT)

Surgalm (Persian: سورگلم, also Romanized as Sūrgalm, Soorgalam, and Sūr Galam; also known as Sūrgūāl Māch, Surguāl Machh, and Surquāl Machh) is a village in Gabrik Rural District, in the Central District of Jask County, Hormozgan Province, Iran. At the 2006 census, its population was 437, in 78 families.
