= Chi Darki =

Chi Darki چي دركي
- Village
- Location within Iran
- Coordinates: 25°40′40″N 58°52′30″E
- Country: Iran
- Province: Hormozgan
- County: Jask
- Bakhsh: Lirdaf
- Rural District: Piveshk

Population (2006)
  - Total: 38
- Time zone: UTC+3:30 (IRST)
  - Summer (DST): UTC+4:30 (IRDT)

Chi Darki (Persian: چي دركي, also Romanized as Chī Darkī; also known as Chedergi) is a village in Piveshk Rural District, Lirdaf District, Jask County, Hormozgan Province, Iran. At the 2006 census, its population was 38, in 10 families.
