= Tit Kan =

Tit Kan تيتكن
- Village
- Location within Iran
- Coordinates: 25°51′50″N 58°13′52″E
- Country: Iran
- Province: Hormozgan
- County: Jask
- Bakhsh: Central
- Rural District: Gabrik

Population (2006)
  - Total: 85
- Time zone: UTC+3:30 (IRST)
  - Summer (DST): UTC+4:30 (IRDT)

Tit Kan (Persian: تيتكن, also Romanized as Tīt Kan; also known as Tītagīn, Tī Takīn, Tītgīn, and Tītkīn) is a village in Gabrik Rural District, in the Central District of Jask County, Hormozgan Province, Iran. At the 2006 census, its population was 85, in 16 families.
