= Garandu =

Garandu (Persian: گاراندو or گرندو) may refer to:

- Garandu, Jask (گرندو – Garandū)
- Garandu, Minab (گاراندو – Gārāndū)
