= Ganjak, Lirdaf =

Ganjak گنجك
- Village
- Location within Iran
- Coordinates: 25°44′30″N 59°12′37″E
- Country: Iran
- Province: Hormozgan
- County: Jask
- Bakhsh: Lirdaf
- Rural District: Piveshk

Population (2006)
  - Total: 105
- Time zone: UTC+3:30 (IRST)

Ganjak (Persian: گنجك) is a village in Piveshk Rural District, Lirdaf District, Jask County, Hormozgan Province, Iran. At the 2006 census, its population was 105, in 25 families.
