= Ki Dar-e Bala =

Ki Dar-e Bala كيدر بالا
- Village
- Location within Iran
- Coordinates: 25°32′38″N 59°00′52″E
- Country: Iran
- Province: Hormozgan
- County: Jask
- Bakhsh: Lirdaf
- Rural District: Piveshk

Population (2006)
  - Total: 216
- Time zone: UTC+3:30 (IRST)
  - Summer (DST): UTC+4:30 (IRDT)

Ki Dar-e Bala (Persian: كيدر بالا, also Romanized as Kī Dar-e Bālā; also known as Kī Dar and Kīdar) is a village in Piveshk Rural District, Lirdaf District, Jask County, Hormozgan Province, Iran. At the 2006 census, its population was 216, in 54 families.
