= Ganjak, Iran =

Ganjak (Persian: گنجك) may refer to:

- Ganjak, Jask, Hormozgan Province
- Ganjak, Lirdaf, Hormozgan Province
- Ganjak, Sistan and Baluchestan
