= Kormi =

Kormi (Persian: كُرمي) may refer to:

- Kormi-ye Bala
- Kormi-ye Pain
- Old spelling of Qormi, Malta
