= Gati =

Gati or GATI may refer to:

- Gati Ltd, an Indian courier delivery services company
- Gati, Nepal, a village
- Gati, Iran, a village
- gati, a term for the subdivisions of the Desire realm in Buddhist cosmology
- Cyclone Gati, a 2020 cyclone that hit Somalia

== People with the name ==
- Maurizio Di Gati (born 1966), Sicilian mafioso
- Kathleen Gati (born 1957), American-Canadian actress
- Toby T. Gati (born 1946), former US Assistant Secretary of State for Intelligence and Research
- Gati Krushna Misra (1911–1992), Indian Chief Justice

== See also ==
- Gatti
- Garti (disambiguation)
- Ghati
- Gatis, a Lithuanian name
