= Ki Dar-e Pain =

Ki Dar-e Pain كيدر پايين
- Village
- Location within Iran
- Coordinates: 25°32′38″N 59°00′52″E
- Country: Iran
- Province: Hormozgan
- County: Jask
- Bakhsh: Lirdaf
- Rural District: Piveshk

Population (2006)
  - Total: 156
- Time zone: UTC+3:30 (IRST)
  - Summer (DST): UTC+4:30 (IRDT)

Ki Dar-e Pain (Persian: كيدر پايين, also Romanized as Kī Dar-e Pā’īn; also known as Kī Dar and Kīdar) is a village in Piveshk Rural District, Lirdaf District, Jask County, Hormozgan Province, Iran. At the 2006 census, its population was 156, in 43 families.
