= Yekdar, Iran =

Village in Hormozgan province, Iran

Yekdar Persian: یکدار
- Village
- Location within Iran
- Coordinates: 25°41′14″N 58°06′11″E
- Country: Iran
- Province: Hormozgan
- County: Jask
- District: Central
- Rural District: Gabrik

Population (2016)
  - Total: 23
- Time zone: UTC+3:30 (IRST)

Yekdar (Persian: یکدار) is a village in, and the capital of, Gabrik Rural District of the Central District of Jask County, Hormozgan province, Iran.

== Demographics ==
=== Population ===
At the time of the 2011 National Census, the village's population was below the reporting threshold. The 2016 census measured the population of the village as 23 people in 4 households.
