= Piveshk =

Village in Hormozgan province, Iran

Piveshk Persian: پي وشك
- Village
- Location within Iran
- Coordinates: 25°33′16″N 58°54′58″E
- Country: Iran
- Province: Hormozgan
- County: Jask
- District: Lirdaf
- Rural District: Piveshk

Population (2016)
  - Total: 1,220
- Time zone: UTC+3:30 (IRST)

Piveshk (Persian: پي وشك) (Note: Also romanized as Pīveshk; also known as Bey Beshk, Beyāsak, Bīāsak, Bīāsk, Pey Beshk, Pī Bashk, and Pvishk) is a village in, and the capital of, Piveshk Rural District of Lirdaf District, Jask County, Hormozgan province, Iran.

== Demographics ==
=== Population ===
At the time of the 2006 National Census, the village's population was 1,056 in 250 households. The following census in 2011 counted 1,160 people in 281 households. The 2016 census measured the population of the village as 1,220 people in 349 households.
