= Sur Chah =

Sur Chah or Soorchah (Persian: سورچاه) may refer to:

- Sur Chah-e Bala
- Sur Chah-e Pain
