= Sur Chah-e Bala =

Sur Chah-e Bala سورچاه بالا
- Village
- Location within Iran
- Coordinates: 25°40′27″N 58°47′06″E
- Country: Iran
- Province: Hormozgan
- County: Jask
- Bakhsh: Lirdaf
- Rural District: Surak

Population (2006)
  - Total: 185
- Time zone: UTC+3:30 (IRST)
  - Summer (DST): UTC+4:30 (IRDT)

Sur Chah-e Bala (Persian: سورچاه بالا, also Romanized as Sūr Chāh-e Bālā; also known as Sūr Chāh) is a village in Surak Rural District, Lirdaf District, Jask County, Hormozgan Province, Iran. At the 2006 census, its population was 185, in 39 families.
