= Abd, Iran =

Abd عبد
- Village
- Location within Iran
- Coordinates: 25°34′50″N 58°47′26″E
- Country: Iran
- Province: Hormozgan
- County: Jask
- Bakhsh: Lirdaf
- Rural District: Surak

Population (2006)
  - Total: 443
- Time zone: UTC+3:30 (IRST)
  - Summer (DST): UTC+4:30 (IRDT)

Abd (Persian: عبد, also Romanized as ‘Abd) is a village in Surak Rural District, Lirdaf District, Jask County, Hormozgan Province, Iran. At the 2006 census, its population was 443, in 96 families.
