= Gowhert =

Village in Hormozgan province, Iran

Gowhert Persian: گوهرت
- Village
- Location within Iran
- Coordinates: 25°37′51″N 58°48′21″E
- Country: Iran
- Province: Hormozgan
- County: Jask
- District: Lirdaf
- Rural District: Surak

Population (2016)
  - Total: 1,025
- Time zone: UTC+3:30 (IRST)

Gowhert (Persian: گوهرت) (Note: Also romanized as Gowhart; also known as Gohart, Gohert, Gohort, Gowhīrat, Gowhīrot, and Kowheyrat) is a village in Surak Rural District of Lirdaf District, Jask County, Hormozgan province, Iran.

== Demographics ==
=== Population ===
At the time of the 2006 National Census, the village's population was 748 in 155 households. The following census in 2011 counted 898 people in 211 households. The 2016 census measured the population of the village as 1,025 people in 264 households. It was the most populous village in its rural district.
