= Kormi-ye Pain =

Kormi-ye Pain كرمي پايين
- Village
- Location within Iran
- Coordinates: 25°43′30″N 58°52′22″E
- Country: Iran
- Province: Hormozgan
- County: Jask
- Bakhsh: Lirdaf
- Rural District: Piveshk

Population (2006)
  - Total: 60
- Time zone: UTC+3:30 (IRST)
  - Summer (DST): UTC+4:30 (IRDT)

Kormi-ye Pain (Persian: كرمي پايين, also Romanized as Kormī-ye Pā’īn; also known as Kormī) is a village in Piveshk Rural District, Lirdaf District, Jask County, Hormozgan Province, Iran. At the 2006 census, its population was 60, in 16 families.
