= Shahrak-e Mohammadabad =

Village in Hormozgan province, Iran

Shahrak-e Mohammadabad Persian: شهرك محمد آباد
- Village
- Location within Iran
- Coordinates: 25°43′01″N 58°05′49″E
- Country: Iran
- Province: Hormozgan
- County: Jask
- District: Central
- Rural District: Gabrik

Population (2016)
  - Total: 532
- Time zone: UTC+3:30 (IRST)

Shahrak-e Mohammadabad (Persian: شهرك محمد آباد) (Note: Also romanized as Shahrak-e Moḩammadābād) is a village in Gabrik Rural District of the Central District of Jask County, Hormozgan province, Iran.

== Demographics ==
=== Population ===
At the time of the 2006 National Census, the village's population was 331 in 63 households. The following census in 2011 counted 367 people in 65 households. The 2016 census measured the population of the village as 532 people in 116 households. It was the most populous village in its rural district.
