= Alai, Iran =

Alai آلائي
- Village
- Location within Iran
- Coordinates: 25°51′38″N 58°46′45″E
- Country: Iran
- Province: Hormozgan
- County: Jask
- Bakhsh: Lirdaf
- Rural District: Surak

Population (2006)
  - Total: 41
- Time zone: UTC+3:30 (IRST)
  - Summer (DST): UTC+4:30 (IRDT)

Alai (Persian: آلائي, also Romanized as Ālā’ī) is a village in Surak Rural District, Lirdaf District, Jask County, Hormozgan Province, Iran. At the 2006 census, its population was 41, in 10 families.
