= Sur Chah-e Pain =

Sur Chah-e Pain سورچاه پايين
- Village
- Location within Iran
- Coordinates: 25°40′49″N 58°47′30″E
- Country: Iran
- Province: Hormozgan
- County: Jask
- Bakhsh: Lirdaf
- Rural District: Surak

Population (2006)
  - Total: 226
- Time zone: UTC+3:30 (IRST)
  - Summer (DST): UTC+4:30 (IRDT)

Sur Chah-e Pain (Persian: سورچاه پايين, also Romanized as Sūr Chāh-e Pā’īn; also known as Soorchah, Sorchat, Sūr Chāh, and Sūrchāt) is a village in Surak Rural District, Lirdaf District, Jask County, Hormozgan Province, Iran. At the 2006 census, its population was 226, in 54 families.
