= Kalari (disambiguation) =

A kalari is a traditional training space for kalaripayattu, a martial art of Kerala, India.

Kalari may also refer to:

== Places ==
- Kalari, Burkina Faso, a village
- Kalari, Iran, a village in Hormozgan Province
- the native name for the Lachlan River, Australia

== Other uses ==
- Kalari, an alternate name for Kalantaka, an aspect of the Hindu god Shiva
- Kalari cheese, an Indian cheese
- Kalari (film), a 2018 Indian Tamil-language film
- Renaldo Kalari (born 1984), Albanian footballer
