= Garandu, Jask =

Garandu گرندو
- Village
- Location within Iran
- Coordinates: 25°45′14″N 58°29′20″E
- Country: Iran
- Province: Hormozgan
- County: Jask
- Bakhsh: Central
- Rural District: Gabrik

Population (2006)
  - Total: 215
- Time zone: UTC+3:30 (IRST)
  - Summer (DST): UTC+4:30 (IRDT)

Garandu (Persian: گرندو, also Romanized as Garandū) is a village in Gabrik Rural District, in the Central District of Jask County, Hormozgan Province, Iran. At the 2006 census, its population was 215, in 52 families.
