= Dival, Hormozgan =

Dival Bosta
- Village
- Location within Iran
- Coordinates: 25°43′15″N 58°11′59″E
- Country: Iran
- Province: Hormozgan
- County: Jask
- Bakhsh: Central
- Rural District: Gabrik

Population (2006)
  - Total: 285
- Time zone: UTC+3:30 (IRST)
  - Summer (DST): UTC+4:30 (IRDT)

Dival (Persian: ديول, also Romanized as Dīval) is a village in Gabrik Rural District, in the Central District of Jask County, Hormozgan Province, Iran. At the 2006 census, its population was 285, in 47 families.
