= Ki Dar =

Ki Dar (Persian: كيدر) may refer to:

- Ki Dar-e Bala
- Ki Dar-e Pain
