= Ganjak, Jask =

Ganjak گنجك
- Village
- Location within Iran
- Coordinates: 25°42′27″N 58°50′32″E
- Country: Iran
- Province: Hormozgan
- County: Jask
- Bakhsh: Central
- Rural District: Gabrik

Population (2006)
  - Total: 54
- Time zone: UTC+3:30 (IRST)

Ganjak (Persian: گنجك) is a village in Gabrik Rural District, in the Central District of Jask County, Hormozgan Province, Iran. At the 2006 census, its population was 54, in 13 families.
