= Nogar Shorq =

Nogar Shorq نگر شرق
- Village
- Location within Iran
- Coordinates: 25°44′30″N 58°51′37″E
- Country: Iran
- Province: Hormozgan
- County: Jask
- Bakhsh: Lirdaf
- Rural District: Piveshk

Population (2006)
  - Total: 314
- Time zone: UTC+3:30 (IRST)
  - Summer (DST): UTC+4:30 (IRDT)

Nogar Shorq (Persian: نگر شرق; also known as Nogar and Nowgar) is a village in Piveshk Rural District, Lirdaf District, Jask County, Hormozgan Province, Iran. At the 2006 census, its population was 314, in 67 families.
