= Poj =

Poj or POJ can refer to:

- Pe̍h-ōe-jī, a Romanisation system for Southern Min Chinese
- Poj Arnon, a Thai film director
- Pochak, Hormozgan, a village in Iran
- The IATA code of Patos de Minas Airport
