= Nogar =

Nogar may refer to:

- Nogar, The term for Walak People, especially male who come from the from Walak tribe in Papua.
- Nogar, a village in Castrillo de Cabrera municipality, León, Spain
- Nogar Shorq, a village in Hormozgan Province, Iran
- Alberto Nogar (1934–2013), a weightlifter from the Philippines
