= Bandar Abbas =

City in Hormozgan province, Iran

Bandar Abbas بندرعباس (Persian)
- City
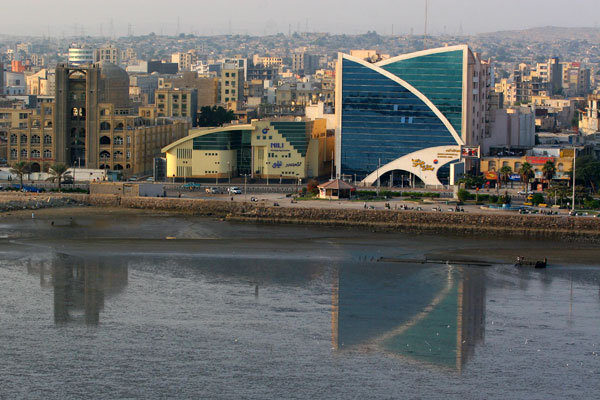
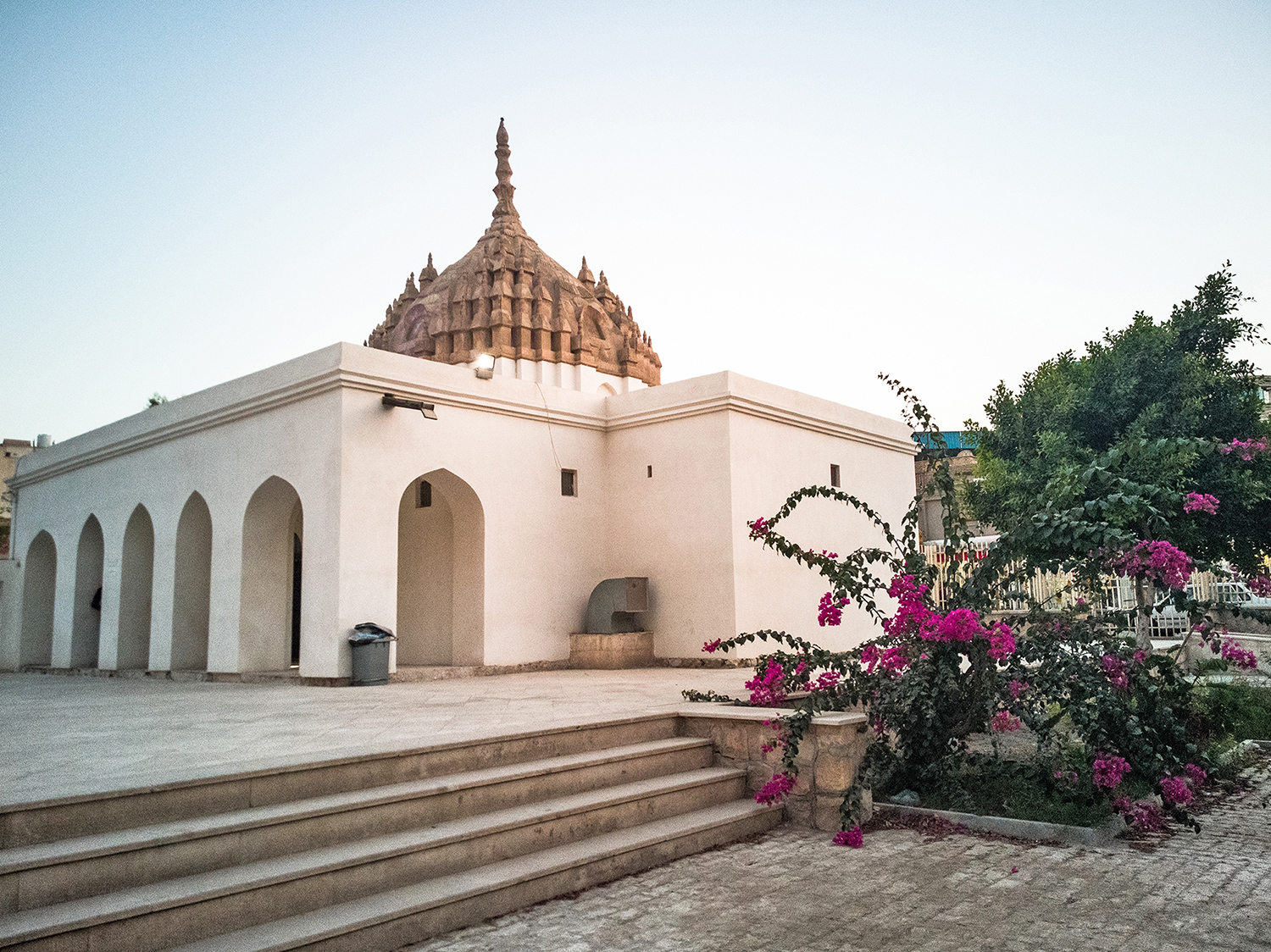
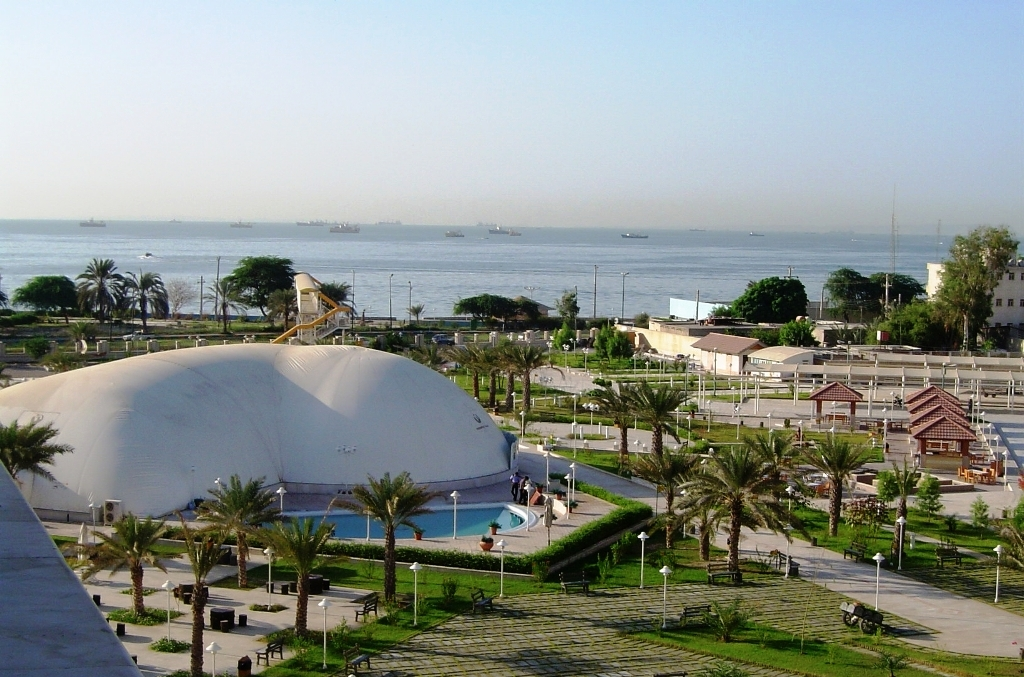
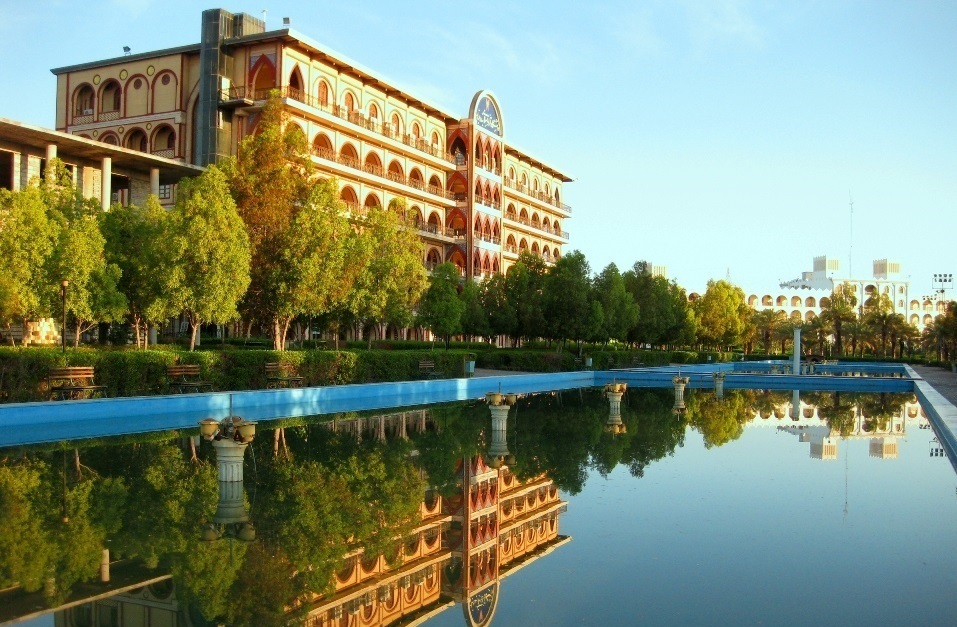
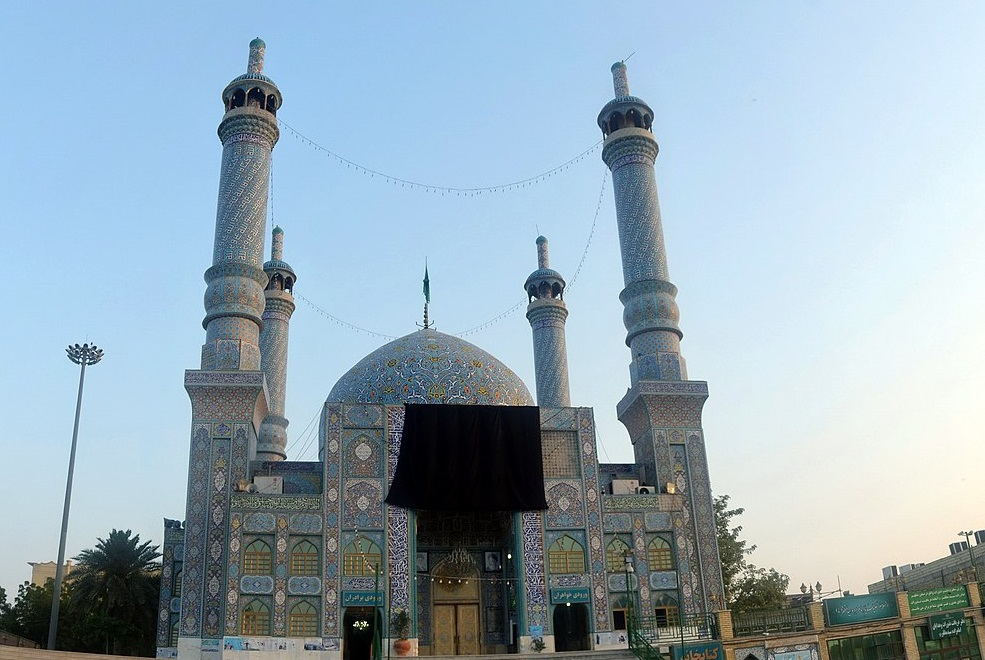
- Taleghani Boulevard, Hindu temple, Panoramic, Islamic Azad University, Imamzadeh Seyed Mozafar

- Seal
- Nickname: The Crab Port
- Map of the Bandar Abbas
- Location in Iran
- Coordinates: 27°11′46″N 56°17′16″E
- Country: Iran
- Province: Hormozgan
- County: Bandar Abbas
- District: Central
- Settled: prior to 600 BC

Government
  - Type: Municipality
  - Mayor: Mehdi Nobani
- Elevation: 9 m (30 ft)

Population (2016)
  - Total: 526,664
- Time zone: UTC+3:30 (IRST)
- Postal code: 79177
- Area code: (+98) 076
- Website: bandarabbas.ir

Bandar Abbas (Persian: بندرعباس, pronounced [bænˌdæɹʔæbˈbɒːs]) (Note: Literally 'Port of Abbas'. Also romanized as Bandar-e 'Abbās, Bandar 'Abbās, and Bandar 'Abbāsī. The city was formerly known as Gamrūn (گمبرون), being referred to as Jamroon (جمبرون) by the Arabs, Cameron or Gombroon by English traders, Cambarão or Porto Comorão by Portuguese traders, and Gamrun or Gumrun by Dutch merchants.) is a port city in the Central District of Bandar Abbas County, Hormozgan Province, Iran, serving as capital of the province, the county, and the district. Bandar Abbas is a port on the southern coast of the country, on the Persian Gulf.

The city occupies a strategic position on the narrow Strait of Hormuz (just across from Musandam Governorate, Oman). It is the location of the main base and headquarters of the Iranian Navy.

== Etymology ==
Bandar Abbas has always been a port, and as such its various names have all reflected this function. The most common name over time was Gamrūn, with various spellings. In Henry Yule's dictionary of Anglo-Indian jargon two etymologies are given; the first derived from gümrük, "customhouse" (from Late Greek kommerkion, from Latin commercium, "commerce"). The second, which Yule found much more convincing, comes from Persian kamrūn, "shrimp" (in Portuguese: camarão, similar to the former Portuguese name). Its current name derives from that of Abbas the Great (r. 1588–1629) paired with bandar – "port", meaning "Port of Abbas".

== History ==
=== Pre-Islamic history ===
The earliest record of Bandar Abbas is during the reign of Darius the Great, the King of Kings of the Achaemenid Empire (between 522 and 486 BC). Darius's commander, Scylax, embarked from Bandar Abbas to India and the Red Sea.

During Alexander III of Macedon's conquest of the Achaemenid Empire, Bandar Abbas was known under the name of Hormirzad.

=== Portuguese period ===
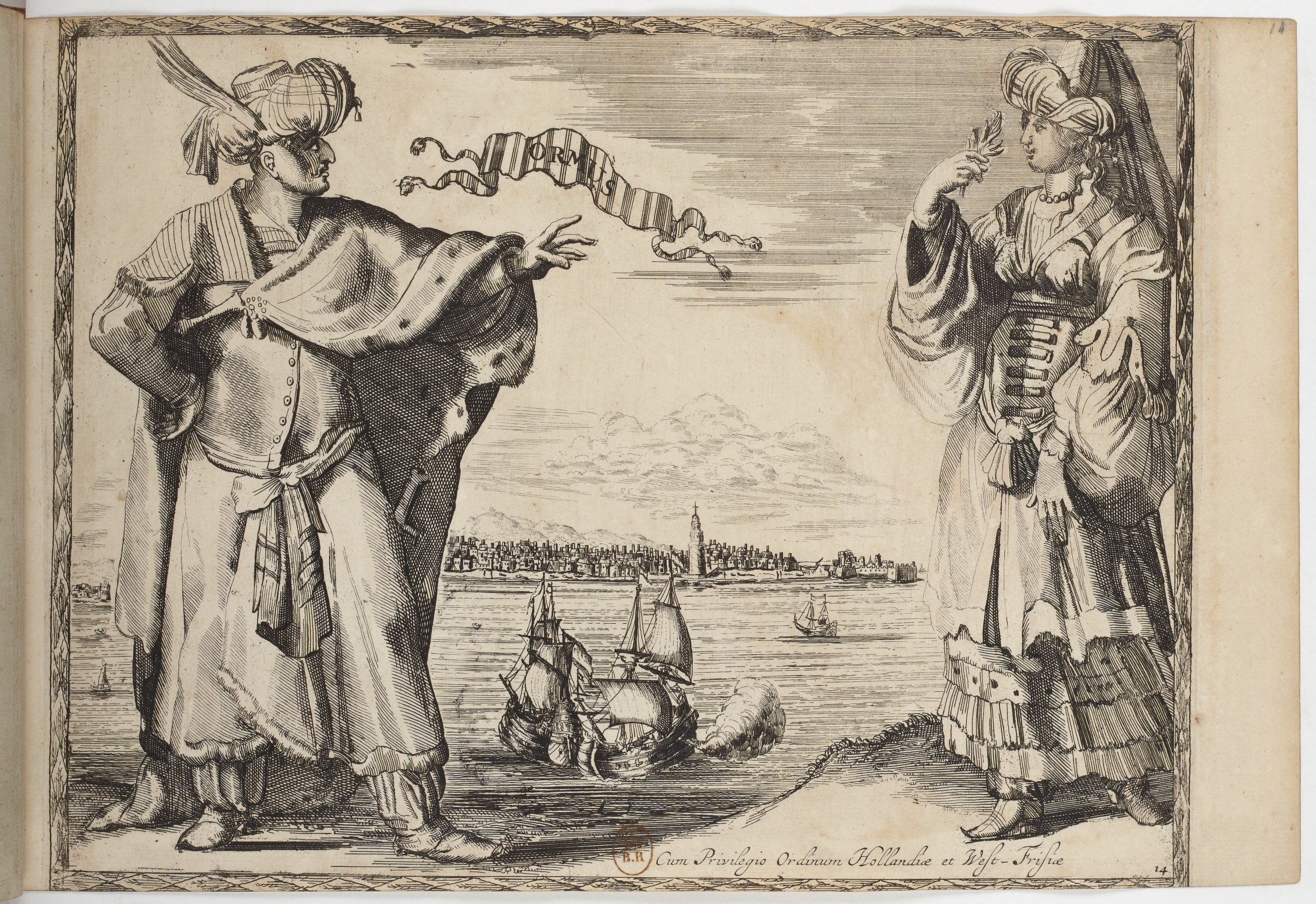
Local costumes from Ormus, 1670

By the 16th century, Bandar Abbas was known as Gamrūn to the Persians. In 1565, a European navigator called it Bamdel Gombruc (that is, Bandar Gümrük, or "Customhouse Port"), citing this as the Persian and Turkish name. Bandar Abbas was conquered by the Portuguese in 1514, and was an important location to protect their commerce in the Persian Gulf and India. They named the city Comorão, due to the presence of lobsters and crabs on its shores.

In 1614, Comorão was taken by Shah Abbas the Great from the Portuguese. In 1622, Shah Abbas defeated Portuguese troops in the region with the help of the English Navy and the Persian commander Imam Quli Khan; the city was renamed Bandar-e Abbas ("Port of Abbas"). Backed by the English Navy, Abbas developed the city (known to the English-speaking world as Gombraun) into a major port.

By 1622, the Portuguese and English names had been officially combined to form Combrù or Combu, although the inhabitants still called it Bandar-e Abbas. Sir Thomas Herbert said the official English name was Gumbrown, but pronounced [gŏmrōōn]. He wrote in 1630 that "some (but I commend them not) write it Gamrou, others Gomrow, and othersome Cummeroon." By the 1670s, the city was known as Gameroon or Gumbroon.

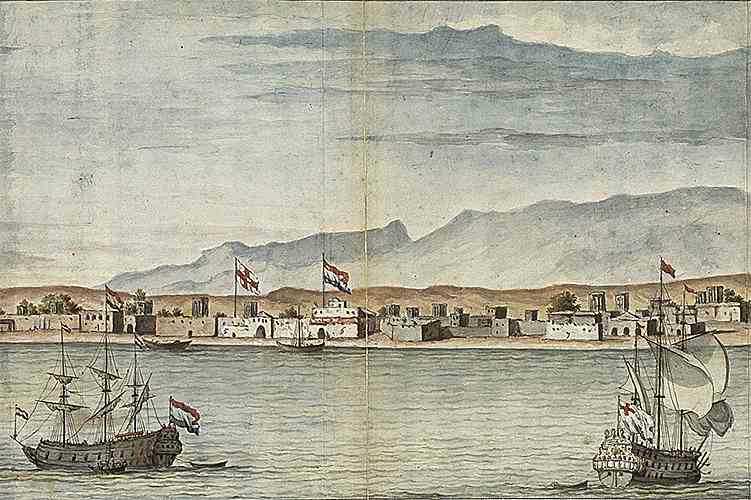
English and Dutch trading posts in Bandar Abbas in 1704

=== Dutch and English period ===
In 1625, a combined Anglo-Dutch fleet attacked the Portuguese at Bandar Abbas and took control of the trade posts. Soon, the Dutch East India Company outcompeted its English counterpart and eventually, from 1654 onwards, was in complete control of the local spice and silk trade, due to multiple English ships being taken, and the Action of 29 January 1654. The Dutch remained in complete control until 1765.

=== Omani period ===
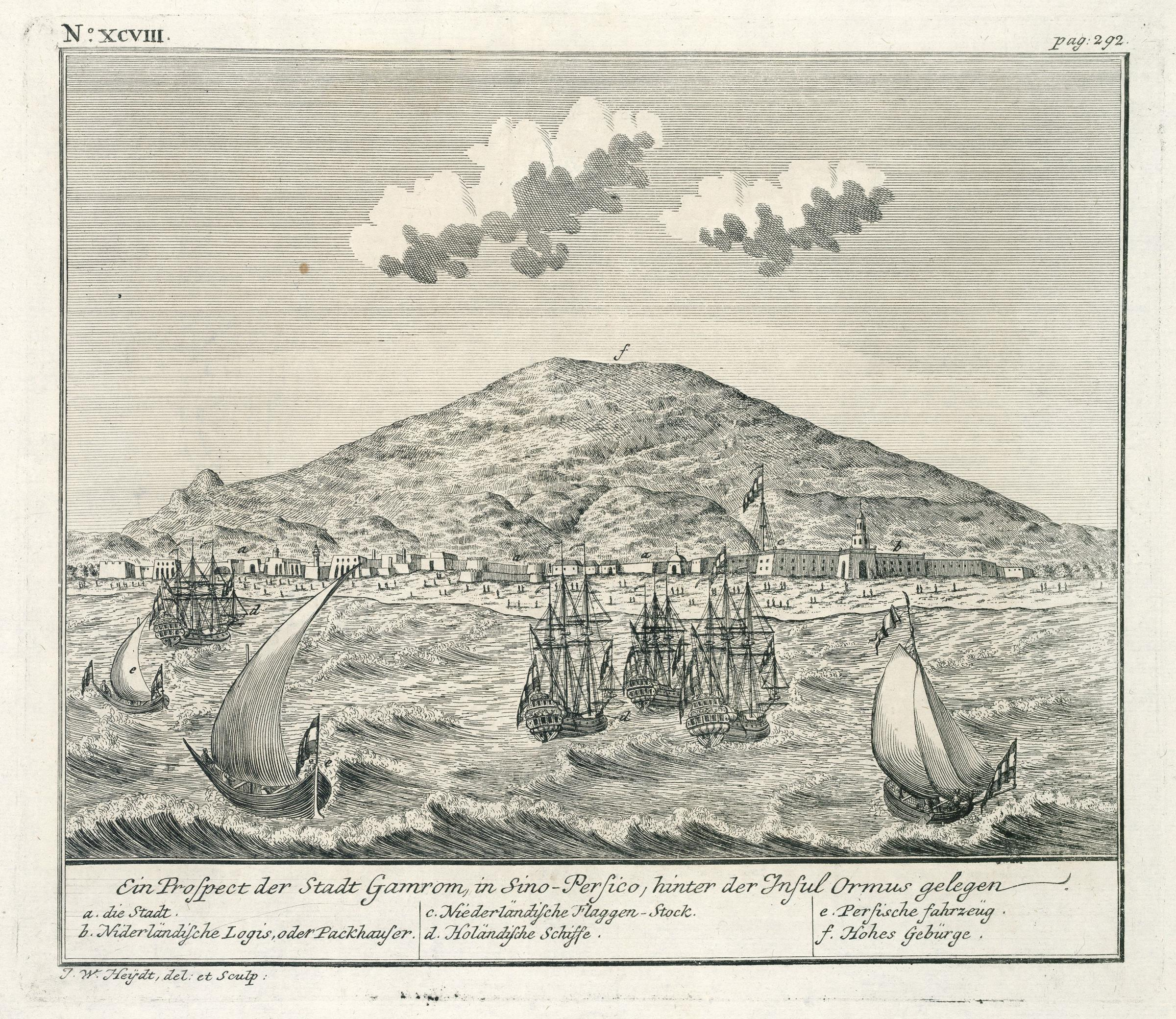
Prospect of "Gamron", c. 1740

Between 1794 and 1868, Bandar Abbas was under the control of the Sultanate of Oman and Zanzibar through a lease agreement with Persia. The details of the original lease apparently differed between the Arabic and Persian versions. The Omanis controlled the coastal stretch of some 100 miles from Sadij to Khamir, and inland about 30 miles, as far as Shamil. They also controlled the islands of Hormuz and Qeshm. In 1823, the Persians attempted to oust the Omanis, but the sultan managed to keep his hold on Bandar through bribery and tribute of the governor of Shiraz. In 1845–1846, an army under the governor-general of Fars menaced Bandar to extort tribute, while another army under the governor of Kerman besieged Minab. The Omanis threatened to blockade Persia, but the British resident at Bushir convinced them to back down.

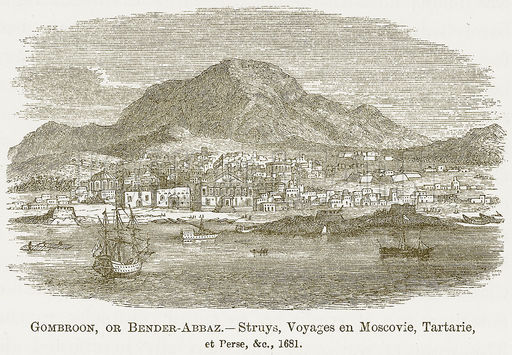
"Gombroon, or Bender-Abbas", illustration from 1862

The Persians recovered the city in 1854, while the sultan was in Zanzibar. Under British pressure following the Anglo-Persian War in 1856, Persia renewed Oman's lease on favourable terms. It was clarified that the leased territory belonged to the province of Fars and that the Persian flag would fly over Bandar Abbas. The rental rate was also increased. Under British pressure the agreement was renewed in 1868, but at a higher rate of rent and for a shorter duration. Two months after its renewal, the lease was cancelled by the Persian government, citing a clause which permitted its termination if the sultan of Oman were overthrown.

=== Contemporary history ===
An earthquake in July 1902 damaged parts of the city, including the governor's house and the customs office, and nearby Qeshm Island.

Mohammad Reza Shah Pahlavi paid particular attention to Bandar Abbas as a strategic port, and during his time the government invested huge amounts of capital in its infrastructure. Before initial plans to develop it as a major harbour, Bandar Abbas was a small fishing port with approximately 17,000 residents in 1955. By 2001, it had grown into a major city. It has a population of 450,000 (2011 estimate).

Bandar Abbas serves as a major shipping point, mostly for imports, and has a long history of trade with India, particularly the port of Surat.

On 27 April, 2025, a powerful explosion at Iran's biggest port of Bandar Abbas occurred. The death toll was reported to be at least 28, with more than 700 people injured.

In May 2025, a nationwide strike by truck drivers in Iran began in Bandar Abbas and spread to multiple provinces, including Isfahan, Shiraz, Tehran, and Kermanshah, according to reports from social media monitoring groups and Persian-language media based abroad. The strike was reportedly triggered by rising insurance premiums, poor road security, a proposed hike in fuel prices, and low freight rates. The planned increase would raise diesel fuel prices from approximately $0.04 to $0.50 per liter.

On 21 June, 2025 during the Iran-Israel War the Israeli air force conducted airstrikes on the port aiming at drone storage sites and a weapons facility.

On 31 January 2026, a strong explosion hit a building in Bandar Abbas, causing major damage. According to unofficial sources, commander Alireza Tangsiri was the intended target of the incident.

== Naval base and headquarters ==
In 1977, the bulk of the fleet of the Iranian Navy was shifted from Khorramshahr to its new headquarters, naval base, and naval airbase at Bandar Abbas.

== Demographics ==
=== Language ===
Original Bandaris (residents of Bandar Abbas) speak Bandari (بندری), a variety of Persian similar to neighbouring Achomi and Dialects of Fars, and distinct from New Persian. Bandari has loanwords from various European languages (e.g. tawāl, "towel"), Persian and Balochi.

Bandar Abbas linguistic composition
language	percent
Bandari Persian	40%
Tehrani Persian	30%
Varieties Dialects of Bandari	15%
Mixed	14%
Koroshi Balochi	1%

=== Population ===
Population history
Year	Pop.	±%
1956	17,710	—
1966	34,627	+95.5%
1976	87,981	+154.1%
1986	201,642	+129.2%
1991	249,504	+23.7%
1996	273,578	+9.6%
2006	367,508	+34.3%
2011	435,751	+18.6%
2016	526,648	+20.9%

At the time of the 2006 National Census, the city's population was 367,508 in 89,404 households. The following census in 2011 counted 435,751 people in 118,336 households. The 2016 census measured the population of the city to be 526,648 people in 152,682 households.

=== Immigration ===
Bandar Abbas has become home to a diverse population representing nearly all Iranian ethnic groups. Many immigrants initially moved to the city individually in search of employment and business opportunities; over time, they settled permanently and brought their families to join them. People from Iranian provinces such as Azerbaijan, Kurdistan, Luristan, Baluchistan, Kerman, Yazd, Isfahan, Fars, Gilan and Mazanadaran have significantly contributed to the city’s economic development.

== Geography ==
=== Location ===
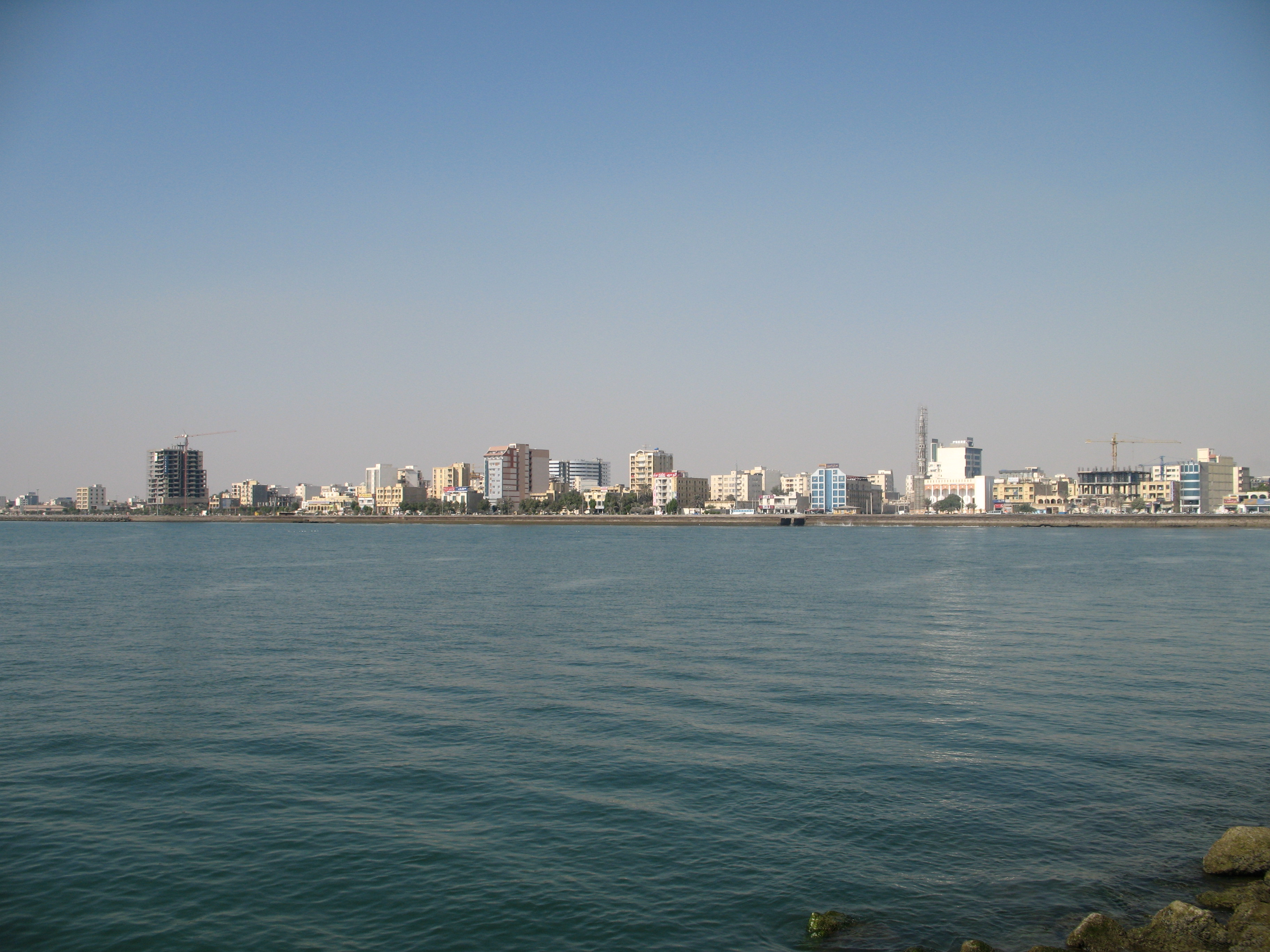
Bandar Abbas skyline in 2007

Bandar Abbas is situated on flat ground with an average altitude of 9 metres (30 ft) above sea level. The nearest elevated areas are Mt. Geno, 17 kilometres (11 mi) to the north, and Mt. Pooladi, 16 kilometres (9.9 mi) to the northwest of the city. The closest river to Bandar Abbas is the River Shoor, which rises on Mt. Geno and occasionally flows into the Persian Gulf, 10 kilometres (6.2 mi) east of the city. South of the city is the island of Qeshm.

=== Climate ===
Bandar Abbas has a hot desert climate (Köppen climate classification BWh). Maximum temperature in summers can reach 49 °C (120 °F) while in winters the minimum temperature may drop to 5 °C (41 °F). The annual rainfall is around 170 millimetres (6.7 in) and the average relative humidity is 65%.

In the summer, Bandar Abbas sees some of the highest average dew points of any city in the world, averaging 27 °C (81 °F) and frequently exceeding 30 °C (86 °F). As a result, heat indices generally top 50 °C (122 °F) for most days during the summer. This high average humidity causes summer diurnal ranges to be lower than in most desert climates, and is a result of onshore flow from the warm waters of the Persian Gulf.

Climate data for Bandar Abbas (1991-2020, records 1957-2020)
Month	Jan	Feb	Mar	Apr	May	Jun	Jul	Aug	Sep	Oct	Nov	Dec	Year
Record high °C (°F)	32.0 (89.6)	33.0 (91.4)	39.0 (102.2)	43.0 (109.4)	47.0 (116.6)	51.0 (123.8)	48.0 (118.4)	46.0 (114.8)	45.0 (113.0)	44.0 (111.2)	38.0 (100.4)	33.8 (92.8)	51.0 (123.8)
Mean daily maximum °C (°F)	23.4 (74.1)	24.9 (76.8)	27.8 (82.0)	32.6 (90.7)	37.1 (98.8)	38.9 (102.0)	38.4 (101.1)	37.7 (99.9)	36.9 (98.4)	35.0 (95.0)	30.2 (86.4)	25.9 (78.6)	32.4 (90.3)
Daily mean °C (°F)	17.5 (63.5)	19.5 (67.1)	22.5 (72.5)	27.0 (80.6)	31.3 (88.3)	33.7 (92.7)	34.3 (93.7)	33.8 (92.8)	32.2 (90.0)	29.1 (84.4)	23.8 (74.8)	19.3 (66.7)	27.0 (80.6)
Mean daily minimum °C (°F)	12.0 (53.6)	14.2 (57.6)	17.2 (63.0)	21.3 (70.3)	25.2 (77.4)	28.4 (83.1)	30.7 (87.3)	30.3 (86.5)	27.8 (82.0)	23.7 (74.7)	18.2 (64.8)	13.3 (55.9)	21.9 (71.4)
Record low °C (°F)	3.0 (37.4)	3.9 (39.0)	6.8 (44.2)	11.5 (52.7)	17.0 (62.6)	20.0 (68.0)	24.0 (75.2)	25.0 (77.0)	20.5 (68.9)	12.0 (53.6)	6.0 (42.8)	2.0 (35.6)	2.0 (35.6)
Average precipitation mm (inches)	47.2 (1.86)	31.1 (1.22)	43.8 (1.72)	5.5 (0.22)	0.2 (0.01)	0.5 (0.02)	1.2 (0.05)	0.4 (0.02)	0.3 (0.01)	6.4 (0.25)	7.6 (0.30)	25.7 (1.01)	169.9 (6.69)
Average precipitation days (≥ 1.0 mm)	3.2	2.7	3.2	0.7	0.1	0.1	0.1	0.2	0.0	0.6	0.7	2.1	13.7
Average relative humidity (%)	65	67	67	62	58	61	67	69	67	65	61	60	64.1
Mean monthly sunshine hours	228	211	231	264	315	304	277	277	268	282	250	237	3,144
Source 1: NOAA NCEI
Source 2: IRIMO (records)

== Sister cities ==
- Busan, South Korea.

== Economy ==
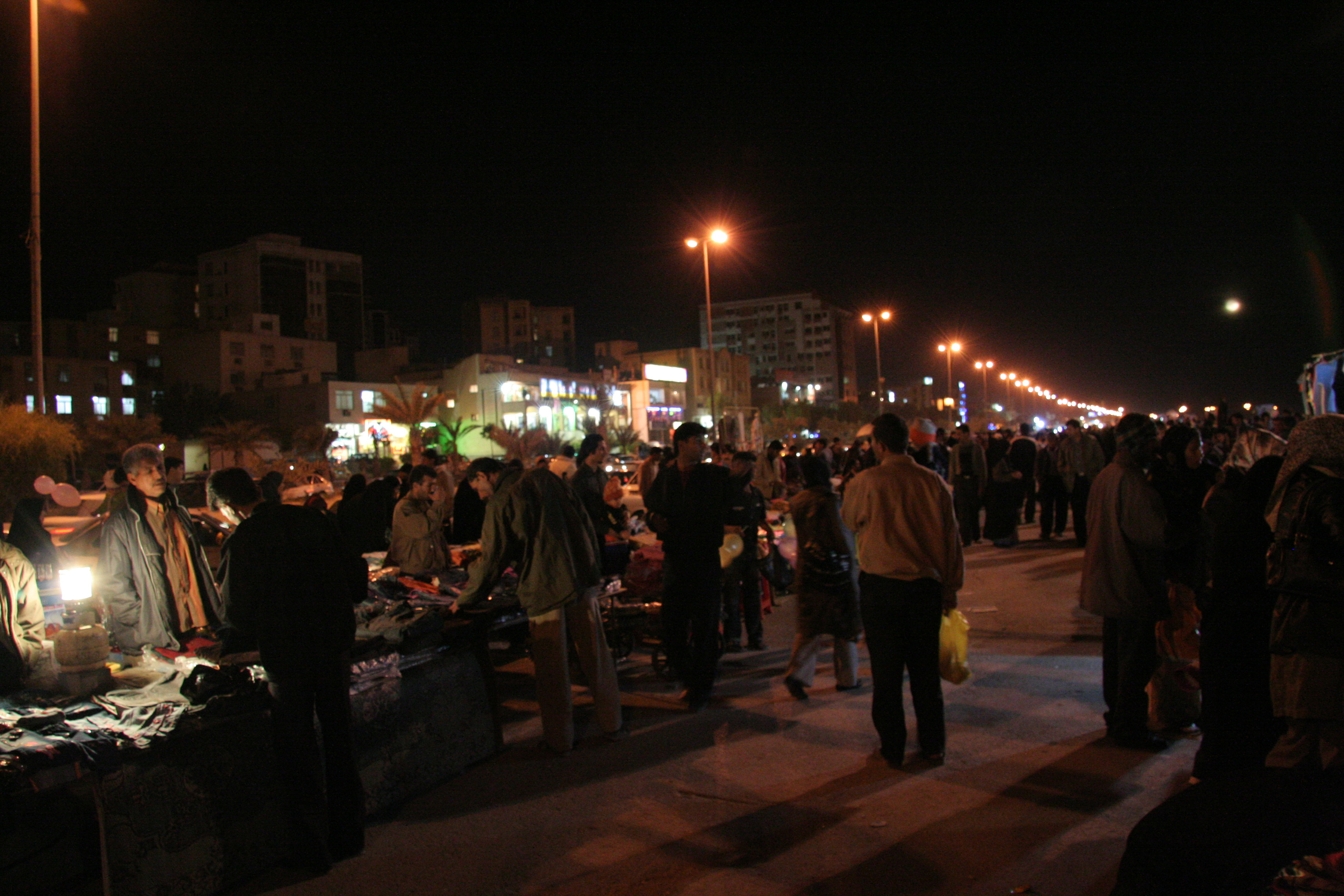
Night market in Bandar Abbas

Minerals such as yellowcake uranium from the Gchine (Gachin) mine in Bandar Abbas is extracted by around 20 tonnes per year. Bandar Abbas is the site of a Chinese-built cruise missile production facility for the manufacture and upgrade of Silkworm (CSS-N-2) cruise missiles.

Bandar Abbas produces and exports transit goods, dates, citrus, tobacco, and fishery such as canned tuna. The city was formerly famous for its export of Iranian pottery, and was known in the west as "goombroon". "Goombroon ware" was the original porcelain imported to England from Goombroon in the early 20th century. It was later replaced by china ware imported from China. Kaolin was the mineral from which the porcelain was made.

== Transportation ==
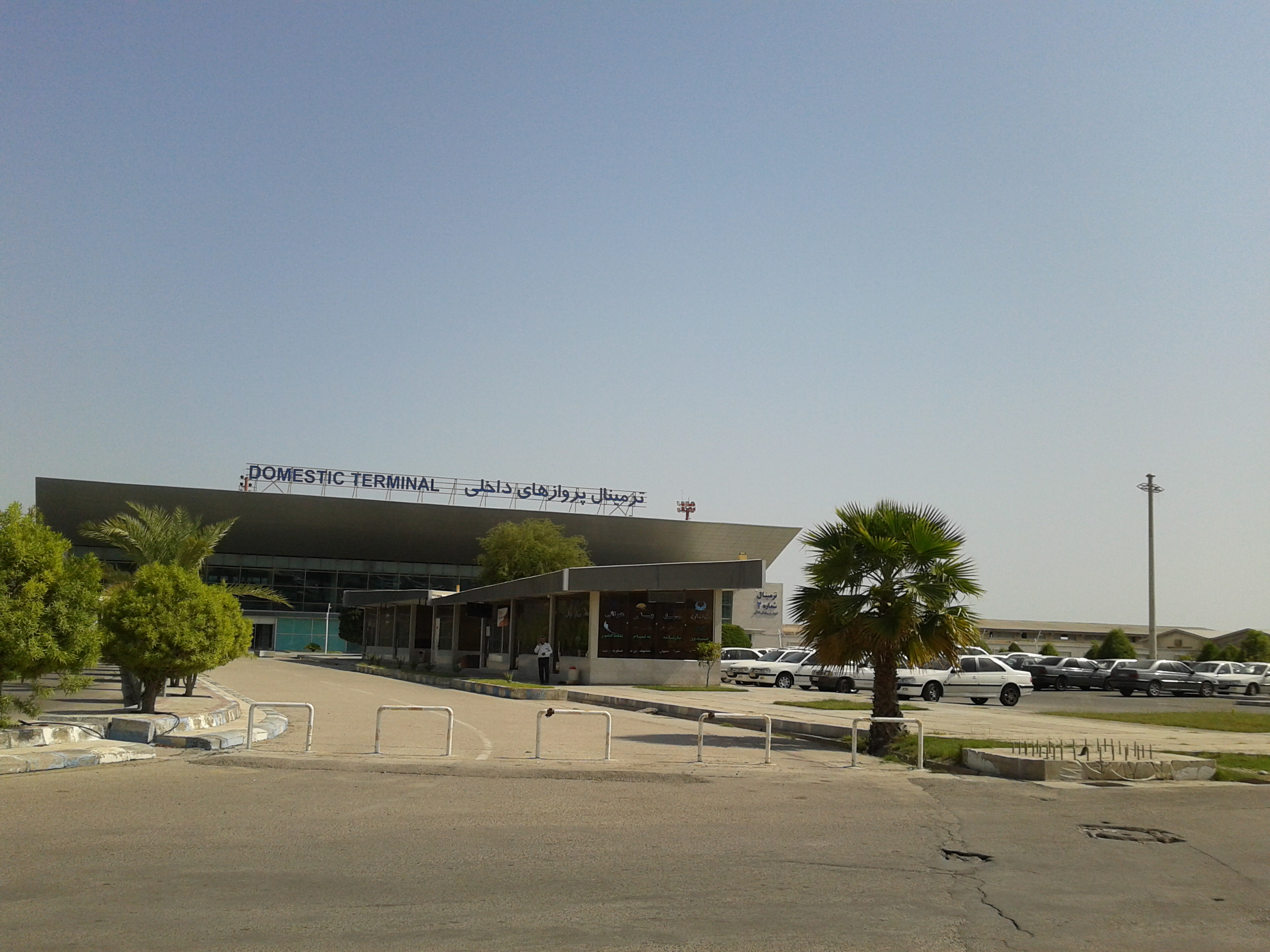
Bandar Abbas International Airport – 2019

=== Air ===
Bandar Abbas International Airport has capacity and facilities for handling large transport airplanes.

=== Roads ===
Bandar Abbas is accessible via the following highways:

- Bandar Abbas-Shiraz, 650 kilometres (400 mi) to the northwest.
- Bandar Abbas-Sirjan, 300 kilometres (190 mi) to the north.
- Bandar Abbas-Kerman, 484 kilometres (301 mi) to the north.
- Bandar Abbas-Zahedan, 722 kilometres (449 mi) to the east.

=== Rail ===
Since 1993, Bandar Abbas has been the southern terminus of Islamic Republic of Iran Railways' main North–South corridor that links it to Yazd, Qom, Tehran and Qazvin to the north.

== Education ==
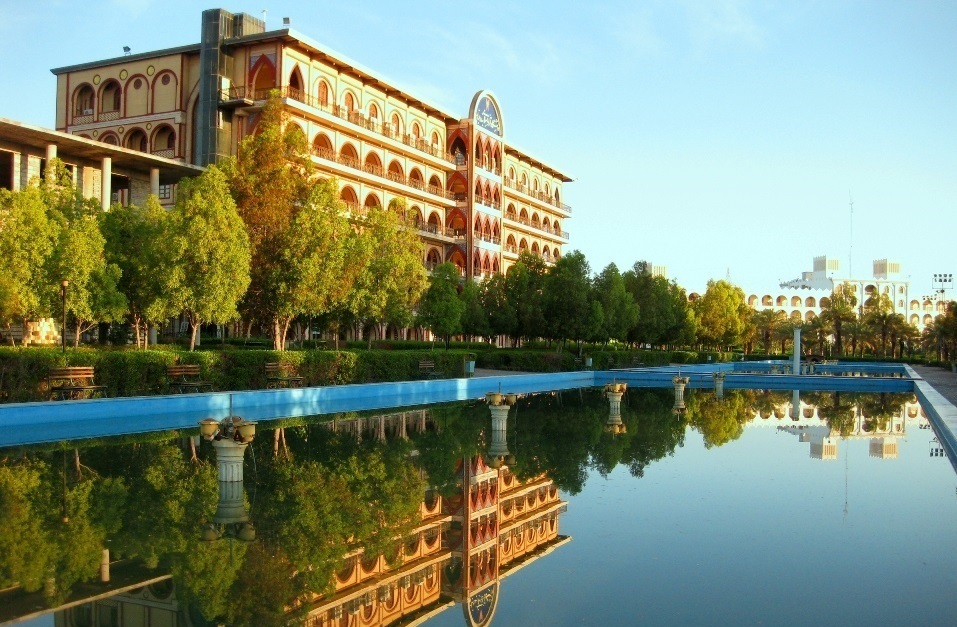
Islamic Azad University of Bandar Abbas

=== Universities ===
- Bandar Abbas University of Medical Sciences
- University of Hormozgan
- Islamic Azad University of Bandar Abbas
- Payame Noor University of Bandar Abbas
- Amir Kabir university of technology, Bandar Abbas Branch
- University of Applied Science and Technology, Bandar Abbas Branch

== Sports ==
Aluminium Hormozgan is Bandar Abbas's main football team. The team was founded in 2006. In 2012 they were promoted to the Iran Pro League but after their first season there they were relegated back to the Azadegan League where they currently play. Bander Abbas also has a second less supported team, Shahrdari Bandar Abbas, which was founded in 2005 and is the municipality's team.

== See also ==
- 2005 Qeshm earthquake
- Bastak
- Bushehr
- Iran Air Flight 655
- ISOICO
- IRIS Bandar Abbas
