= Pochak, Hormozgan =

Pochak پچك
- Village
- Location within Iran
- Coordinates: 25°42′14″N 58°52′52″E
- Country: Iran
- Province: Hormozgan
- County: Jask
- Bakhsh: Lirdaf
- Rural District: Piveshk

Population (2006)
  - Total: 442
- Time zone: UTC+3:30 (IRST)
  - Summer (DST): UTC+4:30 (IRDT)

Pochak (Persian: پچك; also known as Poj and Pojak) is a village in Piveshk Rural District, Lirdaf District, Jask County, Hormozgan Province, Iran. At the 2006 census, its population was 442, in 106 families.
