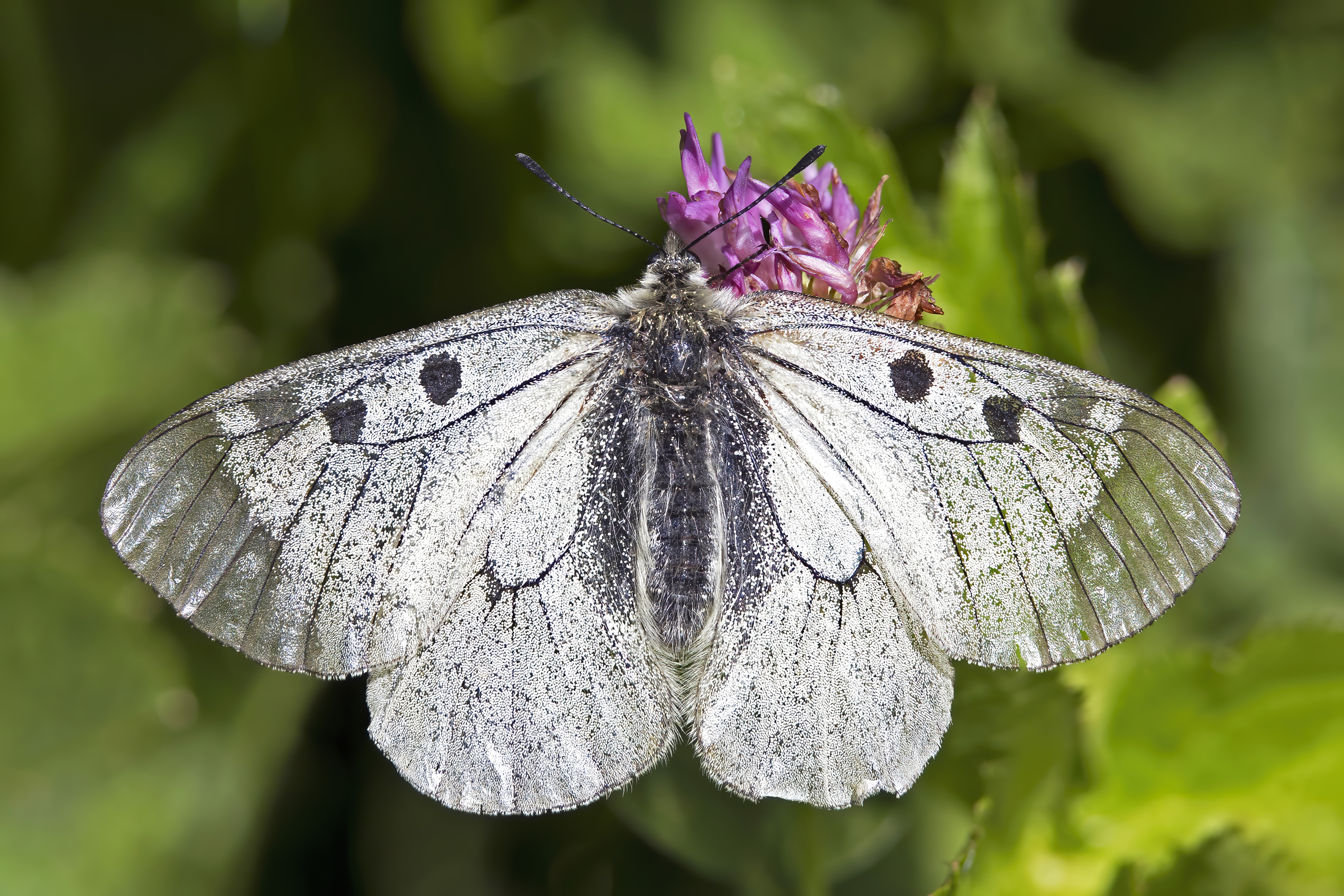
- In Slovenia
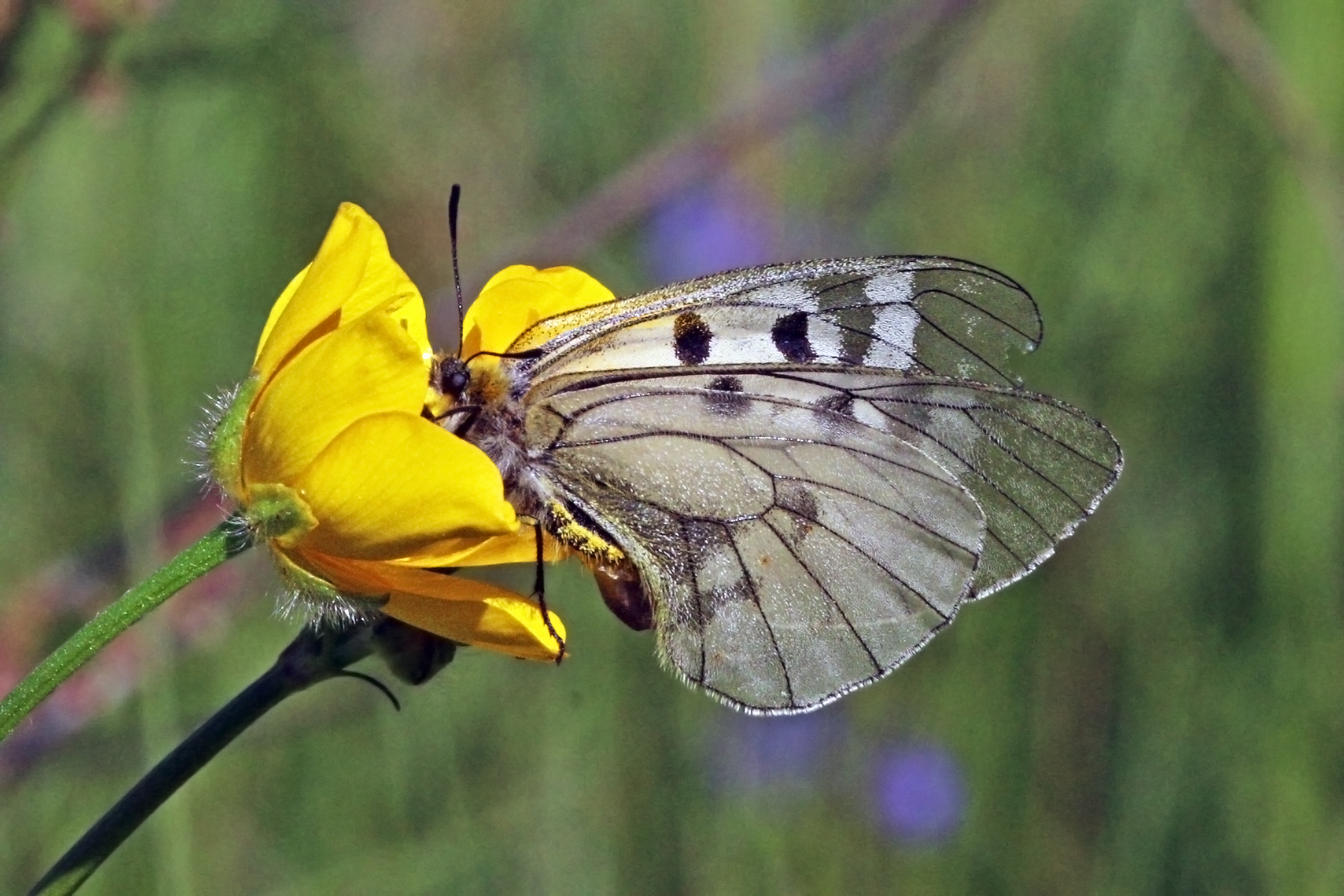
- Female in Estonia

Scientific classification
- Kingdom: Animalia
- Phylum: Arthropoda
- Clade: Pancrustacea
- Class: Insecta
- Order: Lepidoptera
- Family: Papilionidae
- Genus: Parnassius
- Species: P. mnemosyne

Binomial name
- Parnassius mnemosyne (Linnaeus, 1758)

= Clouded Apollo =

Species of butterfly

The clouded Apollo (Parnassius mnemosyne) is a butterfly species of the family of swallowtail butterflies (Papilionidae) found in the Palearctic realm. It is a large butterfly which inhabits meadows and deciduous woodland clearings with plenty of flowering plants, but cannot survive in denser forest. It is found both in the lowlands and in the mountains but not usually found at altitudes above 1,500 m (4,900 ft) except in the Central Asian mountains where it is also known from higher altitudes.

== Distribution ==
Its range of distribution extends from the Pyrenees, across the Central Massif, the Alps, and the Carpathians as far as central Asia. It inhabits all European countries including Norway, where it appears rarely and only in certain places. A subspecies lived in Denmark, but is now extinct. A great number of geographical races and individual forms are distinguished in this extensive region. The most striking specimens include the dark race from the eastern Bavarian Alps (subspecies hartmanni); form melania has the most pronounced dark colouring.

The paper of Dr. I.N. Bolotov and colleagues (2013) summarizes data on the northern localities of Parnassius mnemosyne, which are mostly situated in the Russian Federation and gives a thorough description of the species' northern range location. It is shown that the northernmost populations in the exist within the karst landscapes in the north of White Sea-Kuloi Plateau (between 65°35' and 66°03' N) in the downstream of the Soyana and Kuloi rivers and in the north of Timan Highland (66°10' N) along the shore of Kosminskoe Lake (the Pechora River basin). Northern limits of the clouded Apollo's range appear to be strongly determined by the distribution of its larval host plants (primarily Corydalis solida and the role of climate and relief seem to be of minor importance. Many Russian populations inhabit the state nature reserve territories: Kizgi Scerries Reserve (Karelia Republic), Pinega and Soyansky reserves (Arkhangelsk Oblast), Pechoro-Ilychsky and Belaja Kedva reserves (Komi Republic).

== Type locality ==
The type locality is Åland.

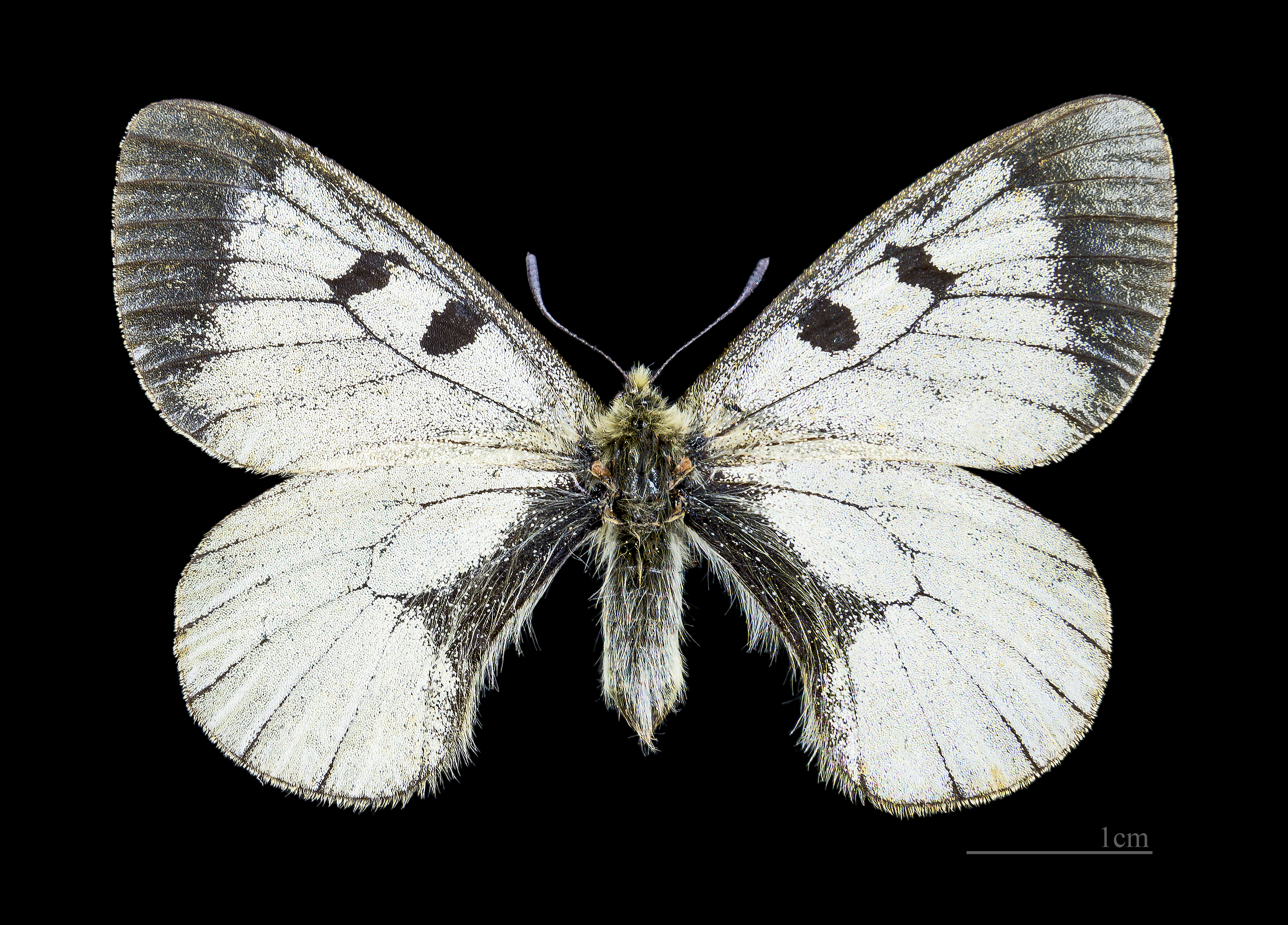
Male

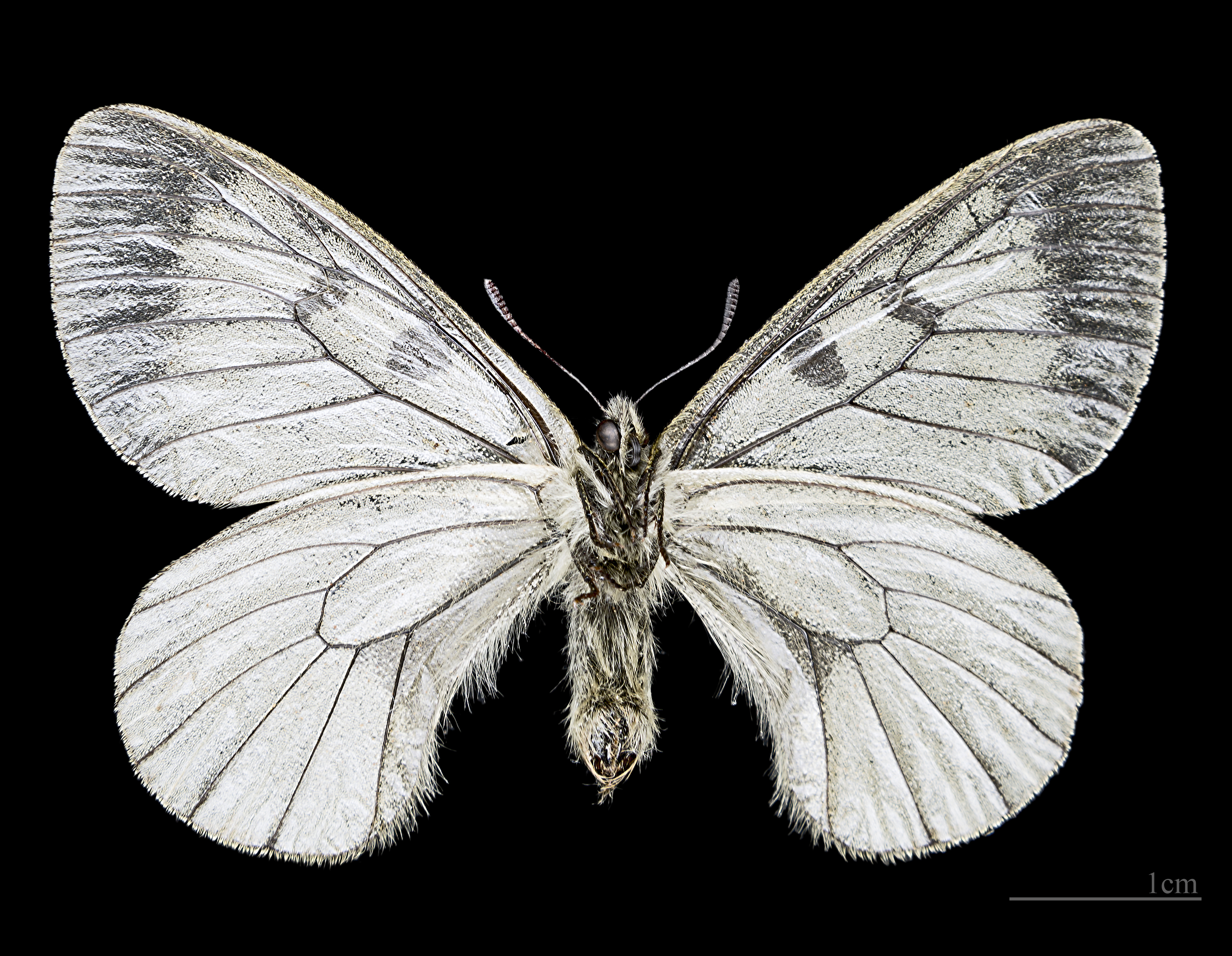
Male bottom

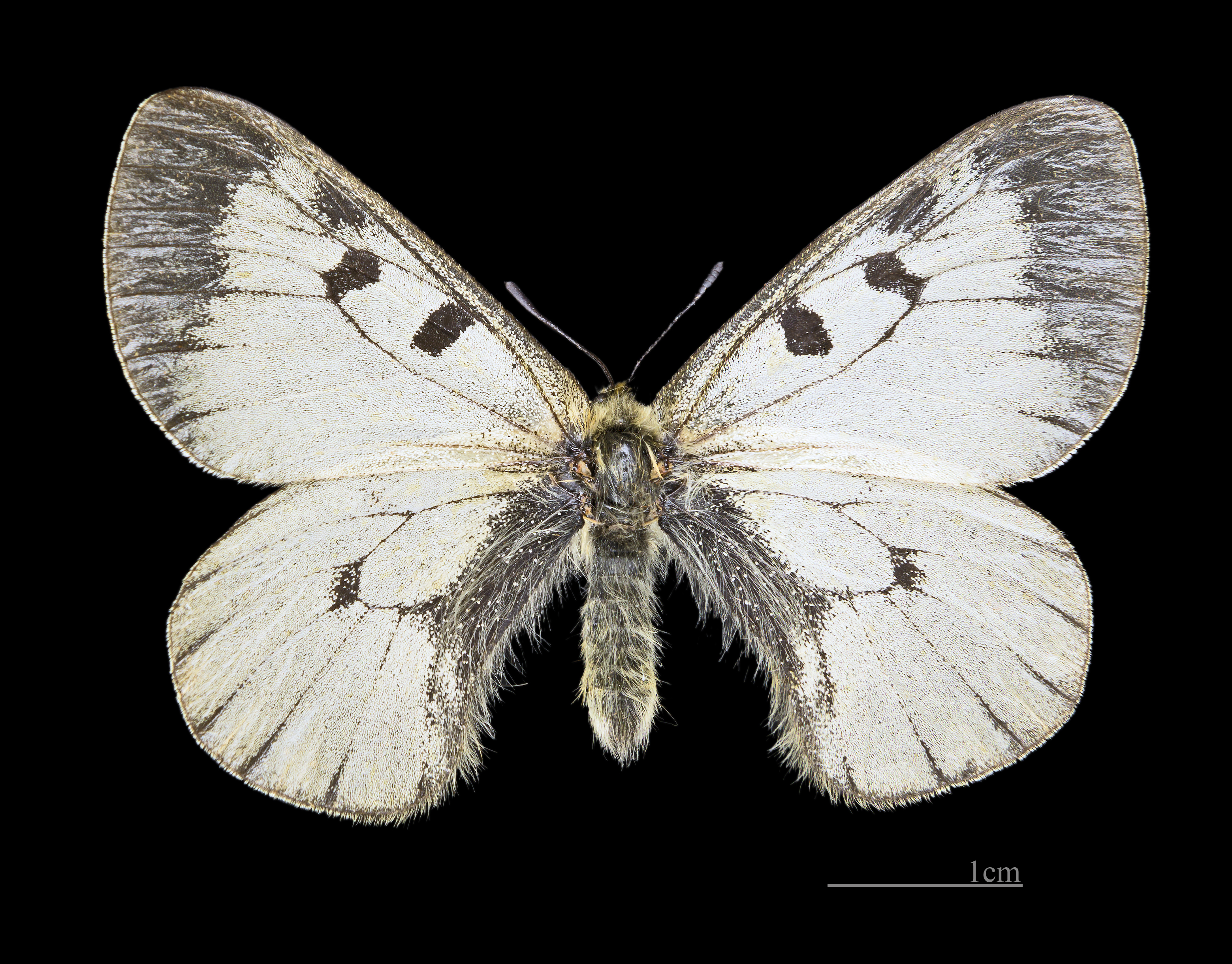
Female

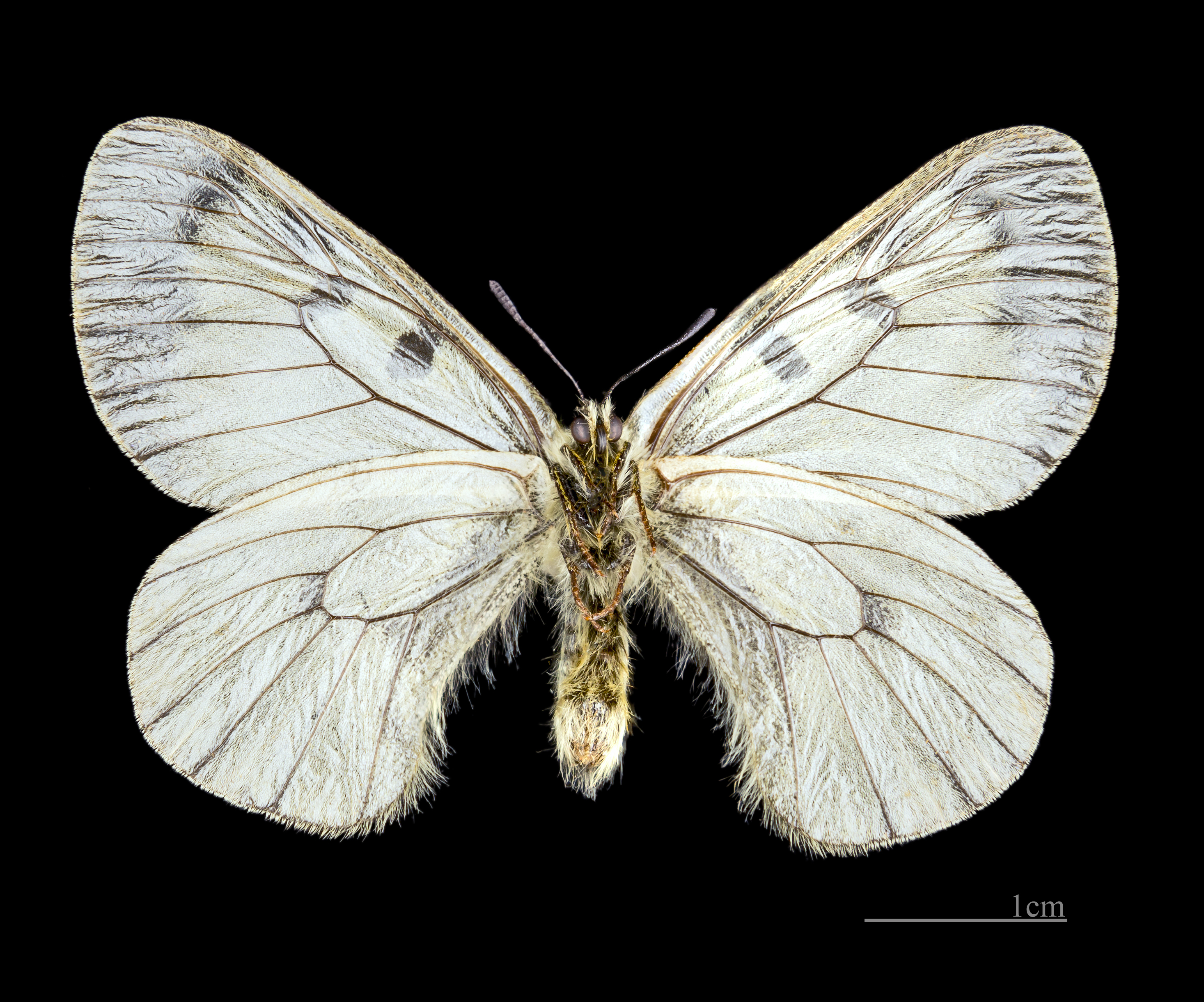
Female bottom
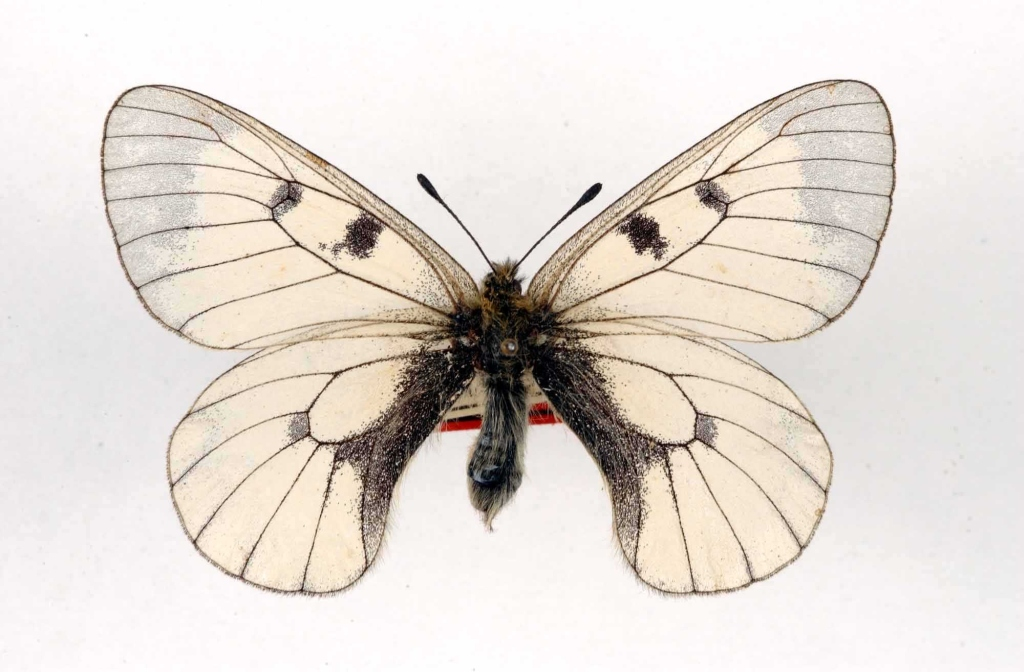
P. m. adamellicus

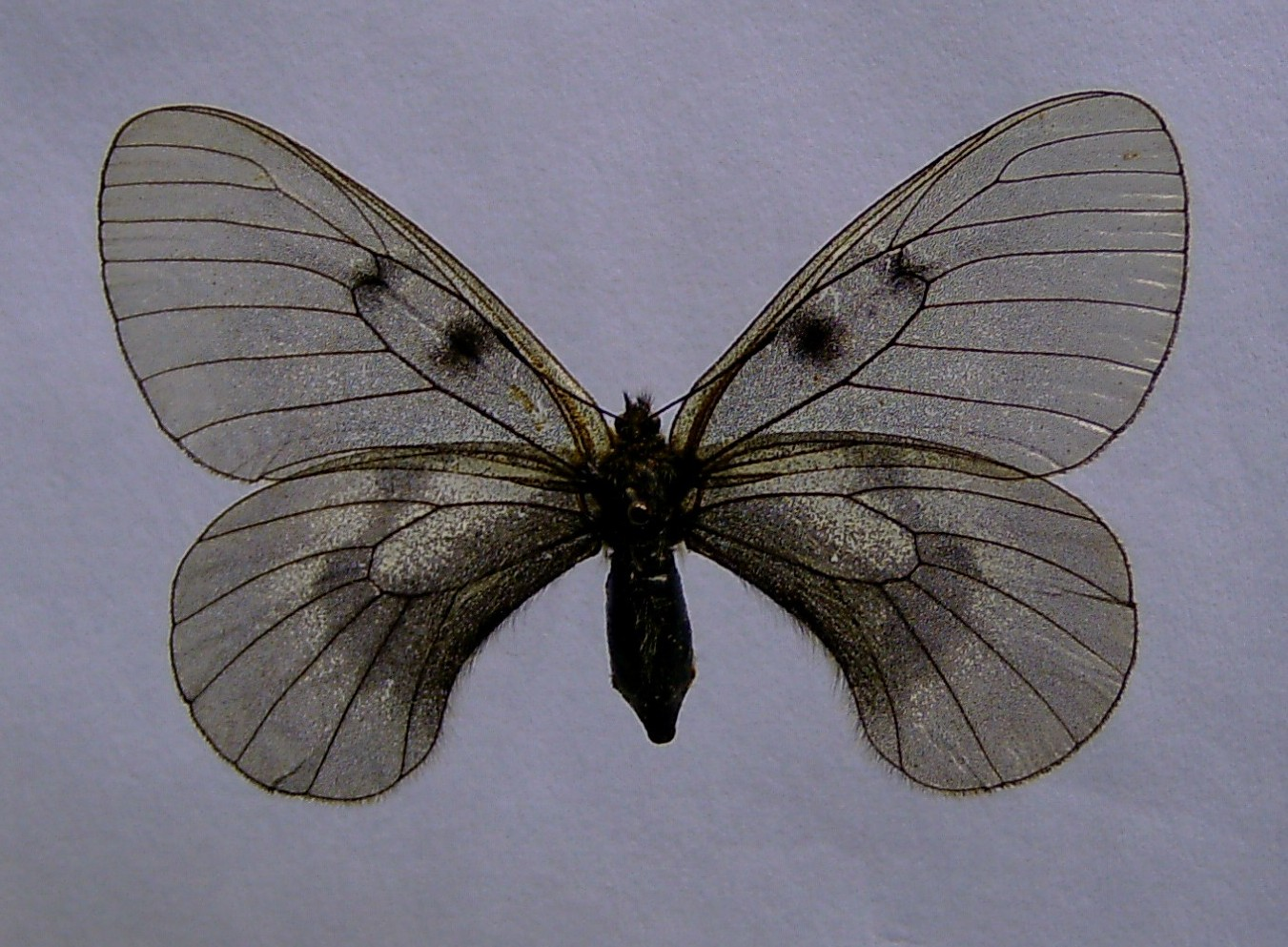
Dark female from the Alps, P. m. hartmanni

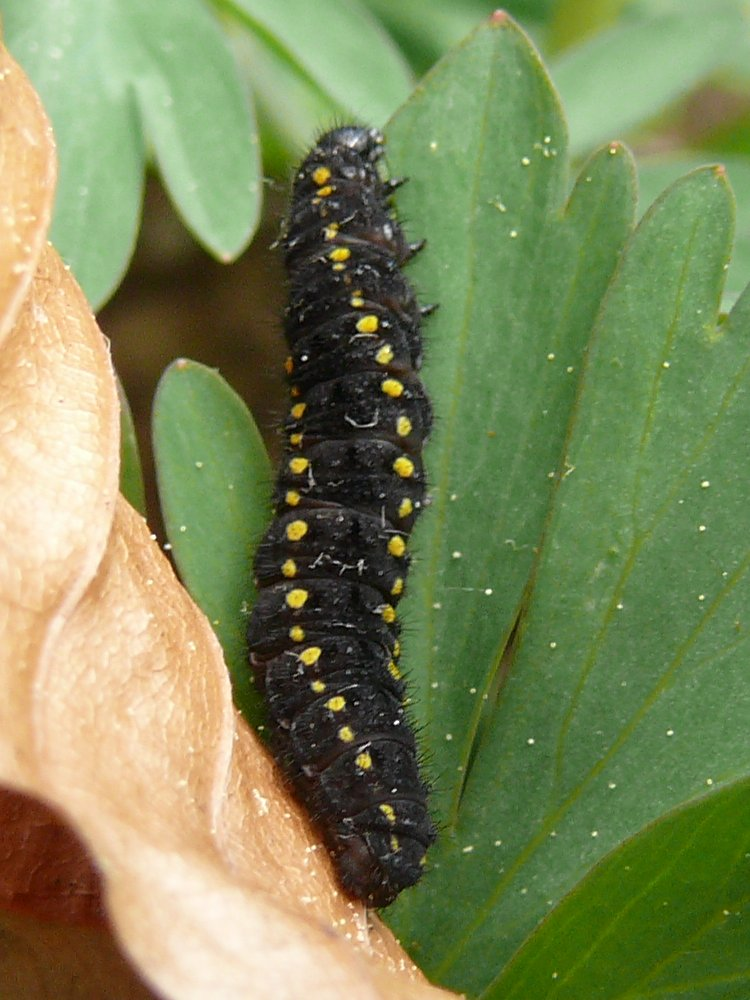
Caterpillar

== Description ==
Wings: White; the veins thinly black, fringes blackish; forewing with 2 black cell-spots, distal margin in male from the apex to about middle, in female further down and also more broadly, transparent-grey; hindwing dusted with black from the abdominal margin to the cell and at the apex of the cell, more densely in female than in male.

Antenna and legs: Black, likewise the abdomen, the last being covered with whitish hairs in the male, while in the female it is nearly naked, glossy, bearing a whitish bladder-like pouch which occupies nearly two -thirds of the underside. Varies generally little.

A rare aberration in which the cell-spots of the forewing are connected by a black streak has received the name ab. halteres Mosch., and as ab. melaina Honr.a form has been introduced which is darkened by dense black dusting (occurring especially often in the female and which is found everywhere among the ordinary form, being particularly often met with in Carinthia, Carniola, in the neighborhood of Vienna, in Wallis (Valais), Transylvania, and Austrian Silesia. In Carinthia, the environs of Friesach, at an elevation of from 630 to 750 m, there occurs a conspicuously small local form, minor Reb. & Rog., in which the black spots of the forewing are reduced, the expanse being only 52 mm. In Bavaria and Salzkammergut (Berchtesgaden), at an altitude of about 1000 m (June—July), the species has developed into a constant melanotic form, hartmanni Stgr., the males of which bear an additional grey costal spot in between the apical cell-spot and the widened and dull blackish transparent marginal band, having moreover the abdominal border of the hindwing broader and more densely dusted with black; the females of this form are developed in the same direction as ab. melaina, but are usually less dark in tint, have a very broad transparent border to the forewing, sometimes a grey S-shaped shadowy transverse band which emanates from the costal spot above mentioned in the male, and possess on the hindwing a more intensely coloured band-like marking behind the cell, extending from the abdominal border forward, and 1 or 2 costal spots. — athene Stich, is the form inhabiting Greece (Chelmos, Olenos); it bears a row of 4 or 5 whitish spots in the moderately broad, posteriorly sharply tapering transparent border of the forewing, otherwise agreeing rather well with ordinary mnemosyne in being somewhat more strongly marked, therefore standing midway between the former and the following form. — nubilosus Christ. (10 f) is the name of the race from Northern Persia and the Caucasus; the white spots in the widened marginal border are more distinctly developed, forming usually a submarginal band consisting of 7 or 8 wedge-shaped or luniform spots; the black markings are intensified and extended, and in the male there appears on the forewing a grey abbreviated band between the apical cell -spot and the transparent border, the forewing bearing further a grey spot at the hind margin and the hindwing bearing an extended dusting of black beyond the cell, forming a kind of band. An enlarged edition of this form from Central Asia (Kuldja, Alai), with the black markings still more intensified and the transparent border more widened, is known as gigantea Stgr. (10f): specimens of this race in which the ground-colour has assumed a slightly yellowish tint are called ab. ochracea Aust. —

The egg of the species is conical, whitish.

Larva cylindrical, tapering at both ends, black, short-hairy, the body ornamented with orange spots; feeds in April and May on Corydalis mnemosyne typ. on C. halleri, C. cava, C. solida, concealed in day-time. Pupation in the ground in a loose cocoon; pupa thick, obtuse, hoary, luteous.

== Habits ==
The clouded Apollo is locally common in some places in central Europe. The female lays whitish eggs with a granular surface. The caterpillar feeds only on sunny days, otherwise it is hidden under leaves or stones. The blunt-ended chrysalis lies on the ground in a light spun covering. The caterpillars feed exclusively on Corydalis species. To prevent the continuing disappearance of this butterfly from many places in central Europe, it is now protected in some regions. They inhabit small patches and individuals move from patch to patch and conservation of a network of patches is required to maintain the gene pool.

== Etymology ==
The species was named in the classical tradition for Mnemosyne, the mother of the nine Muses.

== Subspecies ==
partial list See Global Biodiversity Information Facility for a more complete list of subspecies (mostly described by Hans Fruhstorfer, Felix Bryk and Curt Eisner).

- Parnassius mnemosyne adamellicus
- Parnassius mnemosyne balcanica [Bryk & Eisner, 1930]
- Parnassius mnemosyne bucharanus [Bryk, 1912]
- Parnassius mnemosyne caucasia [Verity, [1911] ]
- Parnassius mnemosyne craspedontis [Fruhstorfer, 1909]
- Parnassius mnemosyne falsus [Pagenstecher, 1911]
- Parnassius mnemosyne giganteus [Staudinger, 1886]
- Parnassius mnemosyne leonhardiana [Fruhstorfer, 1917]
- Parnassius mnemosyne nivalis [Grose-Smith, 1908]
- Parnassius mnemosyne nubilosus [Christoph, 1873]
- Parnassius mnemosyne ochraceus [Austaut, 1891]
- Parnassius mnemosyne orientalis [Verity, 1911]
- Parnassius mnemosyne parnassia [Bryk, 1932]
- Parnassius mnemosyne problematicus [Bryk, 1912]
- Parnassius mnemosyne talboti [Bryk, 1932]
- Parnassius mnemosyne ucrainicus [Bryk & Eisner, 1932]
- Parnassius mnemosyne ugrjumovi [Bryk, 1914]
- Parnassius mnemosyne uralka [Bryk, 1921]
- Parnassius mnemosyne valentinae [Sheljuzhko, 1943]
- Parnassius mnemosyne weidingeri [Bryk & Eisner, 1932]

Philip R. Ackery provided a guide of the genera and species of the Parnassiae, as well as a list of subspecies types in the British Museum (Natural History).
