= Shahrak-e Aliabad =

Shahrak-e Aliabad (Persian: شهرك علي اباد) may refer to:

- Shahrak-e Aliabad, Fars
- Shahrak-e Aliabad, Hormozgan
- Shahrak-e Aliabad, Lorestan
