= Garti =

Garti may refer to:

- Getti, Hormozgan, a village in Iran
- Netta Garti (born 1980), Israeli actress

== See also ==
- Gati (disambiguation)
- Gharti
