= Sedij =

Village in Hormozgan province, Iran

Sedij Persian: سديج
- Village
- Location within Iran
- Coordinates: 25°42′05″N 58°42′30″E
- Country: Iran
- Province: Hormozgan
- County: Jask
- District: Lirdaf
- Rural District: Surak

Population (2016)
  - Total: 663
- Time zone: UTC+3:30 (IRST)

Sedij (Persian: سديج) (Note: Also romanized as Sadīj and Sedīj; also known as Sādaich, Sādeych, Sadīch, Sādovīj, and Sedīch) is a village in, and the capital of, Surak Rural District of Lirdaf District, Jask County, Hormozgan province, Iran. The previous capital of the rural district was the village of Lirdaf, now a city.

== Demographics ==
=== Population ===
At the time of the 2006 National Census, the village's population was 598 in 122 households. The following census in 2011 counted 669 people in 149 households. The 2016 census measured the population of the village as 663 people in 183 households.
