= Pachk =

Pachk or Pochak (Persian: پچك) may refer to:

- Pochak, Hormozgan
- Pachk, Razavi Khorasan
