= Getti, Hormozgan =

Getti گتي
- Village
- Location within Iran
- Coordinates: 25°35′55″N 58°56′57″E
- Country: Iran
- Province: Hormozgan
- County: Jask
- Bakhsh: Lirdaf
- Rural District: Piveshk

Population (2006)
  - Total: 402
- Time zone: UTC+3:30 (IRST)
  - Summer (DST): UTC+4:30 (IRDT)

Getti (Persian: گتي, also Romanized as Gettī and Getī; also known as Gartī, Gatī, and Kartī) is a village in Piveshk Rural District, Lirdaf District, Jask County, Hormozgan Province, Iran. At the 2006 census, its population was 402, in 100 families.
