= Action of 29 January 1654 =

- Part of the First Anglo-Dutch War
Date	29 January 1654
Location	near Bandar Abbas, or near Sindh
Result	Dutch victory: Gulf in complete hands of the Dutch

Belligerents
Commonwealth of England	United Provinces

Commanders and leaders
(Commonwealth of England) Mr. Hargreave (Commonwealth of England) Mr. Walterer	(Dutch Republic) Unknown Admiral

Strength
4 ships	5 ships

Casualties and losses
1 ships captured 1 ship sunk 30–80 Prisoners unknown deaths	No ships lost unknown deaths

The Action of 29 January 1654 was a naval battle between small naval forces of the Dutch and the English, near either Bandar Abbas or Sindh.

== Background ==
Following the commencement of the First Anglo-Dutch War in December 1653, three English merchant ships, namely the Falcon, Dove, and Welcome, set sail from Diu with the purpose of proceeding to Gombroon to load cargo onto the Endeavour. Upon reaching the Persian Gulf these ships engaged two Dutch vessels in battle for a couple of hours. Despite having a superior force, they eventually withdrew. Subsequently, they set sail towards the Endeavour, which was being pursued by a Dutch fleet. They anchored at Gombroon Roads and remained there for two days. Finally, on January 29, they arrived in Gombroon

== Battle ==
During the naval battle, the Dutch Admiral's ship was rendered ineffective by a broadside from the English ship Welcome, which had 21 cannons on that side. The English ship Falcon initially collided with the Dutch Admiral's ship but was soon cleared, only to engage another Dutch ship and lose its foremast. The Falcon was eventually boarded by the Dutch from the laden ship, resulting in an hour-long struggle with considerable losses on both sides. However, a groundless fear of a fire led the Falcon's crew to abandon their ship and escape in boats, leaving behind over 60 able-bodied men who hadn't been injured. The Welcome and the Dove managed to avoid significant harm during the battle. The Endeavour, although initially engaged with two Dutch ships, eventually sank after taking many shots under the waterline, resulting in the loss of English and Dutch lives. The Dutch ships pursued the 2 retreating English ships later in the day. The battle was poorly managed on both sides, with reports of drunkenness among the Dutch and likely similar conditions among the English. The Welcome and the Dove safely reached Surat on February 9, 1653–4. Two days later, two Dutch ships arrived at Surat, bringing the captured Falcon and about 80 English prisoners, which was seen as a dishonorable outcome for the English.

== Aftermath ==
After the battle, the English lodged a complaint about the Dutch attack with the Safavid authorities and requested assistance. However, their plea for aid was declined because the Safavid Empire was preoccupied with other pressing matters. Moreover, the Safavids assured the English that they had no intention of taking action against the Dutch, primarily due to their substantial trade interests with the Dutch that they did not want to ruin. The Dutch dominance in the Gulf was so big that after this battle that the English Agent in Basrah received orders to relocate to a safer location. There was even consideration of sending silk bought in Persia to Europe via Isfahan. Fortunately, news of peace eventually put an end to this precarious situation. This also destroyed England's ideas of an alliance with Portugal to expel the Dutch from India.
