= Lirdaf =

City in Hormozgan province, Iran

Lirdaf Persian: ليردف
- City
- Location within Iran
- Coordinates: 25°39′08″N 58°51′54″E
- Country: Iran
- Province: Hormozgan
- County: Jask
- District: Lirdaf

Population (2016)
  - Total: 1,734
- Time zone: UTC+3:30 (IRST)

Lirdaf (Persian: ليردف) (Note: Also romanized as Līrdaf; also known as Līr and Līrd) is a city in, and the capital of, Lirdaf District of Jask County, Hormozgan province, Iran. As a village, Lirdaf served as the capital of Surak Rural District until its capital was transferred to the village of Sedij.

== Demographics ==
=== Population ===
At the time of the 2006 National Census, Lirdaf's population was 662 in 130 households, when it was a village in Piveshk Rural District. The following census in 2011 counted 1,159 people in 261 households. The 2016 census measured the population of the village as 1,734 people in 451 households. It was the most populous village in its rural district.

Lirdaf was elevated to the status of a city after the census.
