= Alliance of British Drivers =

UK motorists advocacy not-for-profit organisation

- Abbreviation: ABD
- Formation: 1992
- Founders: Brian Gregory; Peter Roberts
- Merger of: Drivers' Alliance
- Type: Not-for-profit
- Director: Brian Gregory
- Director: Brian MacDowall
- Director: Ian Taylor
- Director: Paul Biggs
- Website: www.abd.org.uk
- Formerly called: Association of British Drivers

The Alliance of British Drivers (ABD) is a British not-for-profit organisation that promotes "the interests and concerns of Britain’s drivers". The organisation, operated by Pro-Motor, was formed in 1992 as the Association of British Drivers. In November 2012 it merged with the Drivers' Alliance and adopted the current name.

== Background ==
The membership-based Association of British Drivers (ABD) was formed as a not-for-profit organisation by Brian Gregory in 1993. It was later operated by Pro-Motor which was incorporated in 1994.

The Drivers' Alliance was formed in 2008, to campaign against road pricing, by Peter Roberts. In 2007, Roberts had authored an e-petition, on the government petitions website, opposing government plans to introduce road pricing in the UK. The petition went on to attract almost 1.8 million signatures.

In November 2012 the ABD and the Drivers' Alliance merged, adopting the name Alliance of British Drivers. At the time of the merger, the organisation said "the 'war on the motorist' is still being fought by those opposed to individual freedom".

== Campaigns ==
Their campaigns on speed limits include opposing 20 mph speed limits "where they are not justified" and supporting the setting of speed limits to the 85% percentile of free-flowing traffic speeds. In 2005 they called for the raising and eventual abolition of speed limits on motorways.

Their campaigns for reduced traffic congestion argue for more investment in infrastructure for motor vehicles and opposing reduction in space for cars.

== Claims ==
In 1996 they claimed that human-created climate change is a myth; as of October 2020 the claim is still on their website. In 2004, The Guardian reported that Bernard Abrams, a scientist and a director of the ABD, had stated that global warming is a "sham" and that the world is getting cooler.

In 2019, the ABD used its official Twitter account to personally attack those advocating 20mph speed limit areas in towns, saying it was "obvious to anyone with their brain switched on" that driving at higher speeds was safer. The group subsequently apologised for the tweet.

== Membership ==
In 2004, The Guardian said that the ABD claimed to have 9000 members (0.007% of the UK's 31.7 million drivers) and challenged this by saying that the group's filing at Companies House meant that the number was "far fewer". Brian Gregory, the group's CEO stated "It doesn't matter a fig to me whether we've got 1,500 members or 5,000 members."

== Legal actions ==
The ABD have taken joint legal action with FairFuelUK, another motoring organisation, against the Mayor of London for introducing temporary measures increasing the London congestion charge and extending its hours, without defining the end date.

== Reception ==
In 2004, the then chief constable of North Wales Police, Richard Brunstrom, described the Association of British Drivers as an "unduly influential … pressure group." He added, "They have less than 3,000 members, yet they are given enormous attention by the media. … It's ludicrous — this is a bunch of crackpots being given prime airtime. It's just because the media love a controversy."

In 2020, Alan Wenban-Smith, visiting professor of planning at Birmingham City University and a consultant in urban and regional policy, in a letter to the editor published in the Local Transport Today journal, described ABD as "climate change sceptics," who promote the idea that "climate science is not sufficiently robust to bear the weight placed upon it by decarbonisation." Wenban-Smith characterised the group as "lobbyists with obvious axes to grind, who have found ‘stuff on the internet’ from eccentrics and obsessives," and hold "biased and fringe views." Paul Morozzo, a Greenpeace transport campaigner, called the ABD's intention to raise speed limits a "crackpot idea", while the London Cycling Campaign's Simon Munk called it "an organisation notorious for its fringe views on driving and road safety".
