= Garandu, Minab =

Garandu گاراندو
- Village
- Location within Iran
- Coordinates: 26°24′24″N 57°08′09″E
- Country: Iran
- Province: Hormozgan
- County: Minab
- Bakhsh: Byaban
- Rural District: Byaban

Population (2006)
  - Total: 149
- Time zone: UTC+3:30 (IRST)
  - Summer (DST): UTC+4:30 (IRDT)

Garandu (Persian: گاراندو, also Romanized as Gārāndū; also known as Gārandehū and Kārāndahū) is a village in Byaban Rural District, Byaban District, Minab County, Hormozgan Province, Iran. At the 2006 census, its population was 149, in 21 families.
