= Dival, Sistan and Baluchestan =

Dival ديول
- Village
- Location within Iran
- Coordinates: 25°39′12″N 61°01′49″E
- Country: Iran
- Province: Sistan and Baluchestan
- County: Chabahar
- Bakhsh: Polan
- Rural District: Polan

Population (2006)
  - Total: 507
- Time zone: UTC+3:30 (IRST)
  - Summer (DST): UTC+4:30 (IRDT)

Dival (Persian: ديول, also Romanized as Dīvāl; also known as Dīyūl) is a village that is located within the Polan Rural District, Polan District, Chabahar County, Sistan and Baluchestan Province, Iran.

== Demographics ==
As of the 2006 census, its population was 507, with 84 families.
