= Kalari, Burkina Faso =

Kalari
- Country: Burkina Faso
- Region: Est Region
- Province: Gnagna Province
- Department: Piéla Department

Population (2019)
  - Total: 584

Kalari is a village in the Piéla Department of Gnagna Province in eastern Burkina Faso.

Population
Year	Pop.	±%
1985	304	—
2006	715	+135.2%
2019	584	−18.3%
