= Gatis =

Latvian masculine given name

- Gender: Male

Origin
- Meaning: mature, prepared
- Region of origin: Latvia

Gatis is a Latvian masculine given name borne by over 5,000 men in Latvia.

The etymology of the name is disputed. One suggestion is that it may be related to the Latvian word gatavs ("ready", "mature"). Another suggestion is that it is possibly related to an old Latvian word "gātis" meaning gates or river source. A further suggestion is that the name is derived from the German name Gotthard.

Its name-day is celebrated on 8 January. The name is one of the relatively few surviving names of indigenous origin from among the great number that were revived or introduced during the Latvian National Awakening of the late 19th and early 20th centuries.

== Individuals ==
The name Gatis may refer to:

- Gatis Čakšs (born 1995) Latvian javelin thrower
- Gatis Gūts (born 1976), Latvian bobsleigher
- Gatis Jahovičs (born 1984), Latvian basketball player
- Gatis Kalniņš (born 1981), Latvian footballer
- Gatis Kandis (born 1981), Latvian comedian
- Gatis Smukulis (born 1987), Latvian cyclist
- Gatis Tseplis (born 1971), Latvian ice hockey defenceman
