= Surak Rural District =

Rural district in Hormozgan province, Iran

Surak Rural District Persian: دهستان سورك
- Rural District
- Location within Iran
- Coordinates: 25°52′12″N 58°49′07″E
- Country: Iran
- Province: Hormozgan
- County: Jask
- District: Lirdaf
- Capital: Sedij

Population (2016)
  - Total: 7,038
- Time zone: UTC+3:30 (IRST)

Surak Rural District (Persian: دهستان سورك) is in Lirdaf District of Jask County, Hormozgan province, Iran. Its capital is the village of Sedij. The previous capital of the rural district was the village of Lirdaf, now a city.

== Demographics ==
=== Population ===
At the time of the 2006 National Census, the rural district's population was 5,978 in 1,362 households. There were 6,642 inhabitants in 1,674 households at the following census of 2011. The 2016 census measured the population of the rural district as 7,038 in 1,921 households. The most populous of its 45 villages was Gowhert, with 1,025 people.
