= Gabrik Rural District =

Rural district in Hormozgan province, Iran

Gabrik Rural District Persian: دهستان گابريك
- Rural District
- Location within Iran
- Coordinates: 25°50′10″N 58°16′33″E
- Country: Iran
- Province: Hormozgan
- County: Jask
- District: Central
- Capital: Yekdar

Population (2016)
  - Total: 6,561
- Time zone: UTC+3:30 (IRST)

Gabrik Rural District (Persian: دهستان گابريك) is in the Central District of Jask County, Hormozgan province, Iran. Its capital is the village of Yekdar.

== Demographics ==
=== Population ===
At the time of the 2006 National Census, the rural district's population was 5,161 in 1,129 households. There were 5,948 inhabitants in 1,226 households at the following census of 2011. The 2016 census measured the population of the rural district as 6,561 in 1,512 households. The most populous of its 53 villages was Shahrak-e Mohammadabad, with 532 people.
