= Central District (Jask County) =

District in Hormozgan province, Iran

Central District (Jask County) Persian: بخش مرکزی شهرستان جاسک
- District
- Location within Iran
- Coordinates: 25°52′33″N 57°56′54″E
- Country: Iran
- Province: Hormozgan
- County: Jask
- Capital: Jask

Population (2016)
  - Total: 39,224
- Time zone: UTC+3:30 (IRST)

The Central District of Jask County (Persian: بخش مرکزی شهرستان جاسک) is in Hormozgan province, Iran. Its capital is the city of Jask.

== Demographics ==
=== Population ===
At the time of the 2006 National Census, the district's population was 28,807 in 5,854 households. The following census in 2011 counted 34,637 people in 7,330 households. The 2016 census measured the population of the district as 39,224 inhabitants in 9,888 households.

=== Administrative divisions ===
Central District (Jask County) Population
Administrative Divisions	2006	2011	2016
Gabrik RD	5,161	5,948	6,561
Jask RD	6,392	7,810	8,382
Kangan RD	6,121	7,069	7,421
Jask (city)	11,133	13,810	16,860
Total	28,807	34,637	39,224
RD = Rural District
