= Piveshk Rural District =

Rural district in Hormozgan province, Iran

Piveshk Rural District Persian: دهستان پي وشك
- Rural District
- Location within Iran
- Coordinates: 25°36′15″N 59°01′34″E
- Country: Iran
- Province: Hormozgan
- County: Jask
- District: Lirdaf
- Capital: Piveshk

Population (2016)
  - Total: 12,622
- Time zone: UTC+3:30 (IRST)

Piveshk Rural District (Persian: دهستان پي وشك) is in Lirdaf District of Jask County, Hormozgan province, Iran. Its capital is the village of Piveshk.

== Demographics ==
=== Population ===
At the time of the 2006 National Census, the rural district's population was 9,749 in 2,277 households. There were 11,603 inhabitants in 2,849 households at the following census of 2011. The 2016 census measured the population of the rural district as 12,622 in 3,402 households. The most populous of its 41 villages was Lirdaf (now a city), with 1,734 people.
