= Lirdaf District =

District in Hormozgan province, Iran

Lirdaf District Persian: بخش لیردف
- District
- Location within Iran
- Coordinates: 25°48′19″N 58°51′54″E
- Country: Iran
- Province: Hormozgan
- County: Jask
- Capital: Lirdaf

Population (2016)
  - Total: 19,660
- Time zone: UTC+3:30 (IRST)

Lirdaf District (Persian: بخش لیردف) is in Jask County, Hormozgan province, Iran. Its capital is the city of Lirdaf.

== History ==
After the 2016 National Census, the village of Lirdaf was elevated to the status of a city.

== Demographics ==
=== Population ===
At the time of the 2006 census, the district's population was 15,727 in 3,639 households. The following census in 2011 counted 18,245 people in 4,523 households. The 2016 census measured the population of the district as 19,660 inhabitants in 5,323 households.

=== Administrative divisions ===
Lirdaf District Population
Administrative Divisions	2006	2011	2016
Piveshk RD	9,749	11,603	12,622
Surak RD	5,978	6,642	7,038
Lirdaf (city) (Note: Became a city after the 2016 census)			
Total	15,727	18,245	19,660
RD = Rural District
