= Jask County =

County in Hormozgan province, Iran

Jask County Persian: شَهرِستانِ جاسک
- County
- Location of Jask County in Hormozgan province (bottom right, pink)

- Location of Hormozgan province in Iran
- Coordinates: 25°47′N 58°14′E
- Country: Iran
- Province: Hormozgan
- Capital: Jask
- Districts: Central, Lirdaf

Area
  - Total: 10,948 km^{2} (4,227 sq mi)

Population (2016)
  - Total: 58,884
  - Density: 5.3785/km^{2} (13.930/sq mi)
- Time zone: UTC+3:30 (IRST)

Jask County (Persian: شَهرِستانِ جاسک) is in Hormozgan province, Iran. Its capital is the city of Jask.

== History ==
After the 2006 National Census, Bashagard District was separated from the county in the establishment of Bashagard County. After the 2016 census, the village of Lirdaf was elevated to the status of a city.

== Demographics ==
=== Population ===
At the time of the 2006 census, the county's population was 75,769 in 16,667 households. The following census in 2011 counted 52,882 people in 11,819 households. The 2016 census measured the population of the county as 58,884 in 15,211 households.

=== Administrative divisions ===
Jask County's population history and administrative structure over the three consecutive censuses are shown in the following table.

Jask County Population
Administrative Divisions	2006	2011	2016
Central District	28,807	34,637	39,224
Gabrik RD	5,161	5,948	6,561
Jask RD	6,392	7,810	8,382
Kangan RD	6,121	7,069	7,421
Jask (city)	11,133	13,810	16,860
Bashagard District (Note: Transferred to Bashagard County)	31,235		
Gafr and Parmon RD	7,968		
Gowharan RD (Note: Formerly Angahran Rural District)	13,017		
Jakdan RD	8,078		
Sardasht RD	2,172		
Lirdaf District	15,727	18,245	19,660
Piveshk RD	9,749	11,603	12,622
Surak RD	5,978	6,642	7,038
Lirdaf (city) (Note: Became a city after the 2016 census)			
Total	75,769	52,882	58,884
RD = Rural District

== See also ==
Media related to Jask County at Wikimedia Commons
