= Kangan =

Kangan may refer to:

== Places in India ==
- Kangan, Jammu and Kashmir, a town
- Kangan Heri, a village in Delhi

== Places in Iran ==
- Kangan County in Bushehr Province
- Bandar Kangan, a city in Bushehr Province
- Kangan, Hormozgan, a village in Hormozgan Province
- Kangan-e Nasri, a village in Hormozgan Province
- Kangan Rural District, in Hormozgan Province
- Kangan, South Khorasan, a village in South Khorasan
- Kangan Jan, a village in Fars Province
- Kangan gas field in Fars Province

== Other uses ==
- Kangan (film), a 1971 Indian Hindi language film
- Kangan Institute, an educational institute in Australia
- Myer Kangan (1917-1991), Australian public servant and namesake of Kangan Institute
- Kangan Giin (1217–1300), Japanese Buddhist monk
- A type of bangle in South Asia
- Kangan, a fictional country in the novel Anthills of the Savannah by Chinua Achebe

== See also ==
- Kagan (disambiguation)
- Kaghan (disambiguation) (including places in Pakistan)
- Kangana Ranaut (born 1987), Indian actress
