= Kangan, Iran =

Kangan (Persian: گنگان or كنگان) may refer to:

- Kangan, Bushehr
- Kangan, Hormozgan
- Kangan-e Nasri, Hormozgan Province
- Kangan Rural District, in Hormozgan Province
- Kangan, South Khorasan
