= Kuh-e Mobarak =

Kuh-e Mobarak or Kuh Mobarak or Kuhmobarak or Kooh Mobarak or Kuh-i-Mubarak (Persian: كوه مبارك) may refer to:

- Mogh-e Qanbareh-ye Kuh Mobarak
- Sangari Mach
- Tambaseyun-e Kuh Mobarak
