= Shirahan =

Shirahan (Persian: شيراهن) may refer to:

- Shirahan-e Bisheh
- Shirahan-e Shahr
