= Eurohawk =

Eurohawk may refer to:

- The RQ-4E EuroHawk (or Euro Hawk) sub-version of the Northrop Grumman RQ-4 Global Hawk, a type of unmanned aircraft
- Eurohawk hairstyle, a type of Mohawk
