= AN/ALE-50 towed decoy system =

Military aircraft towed decoy system

AN/ALE-50
- Radar jamming and deception towed decoy
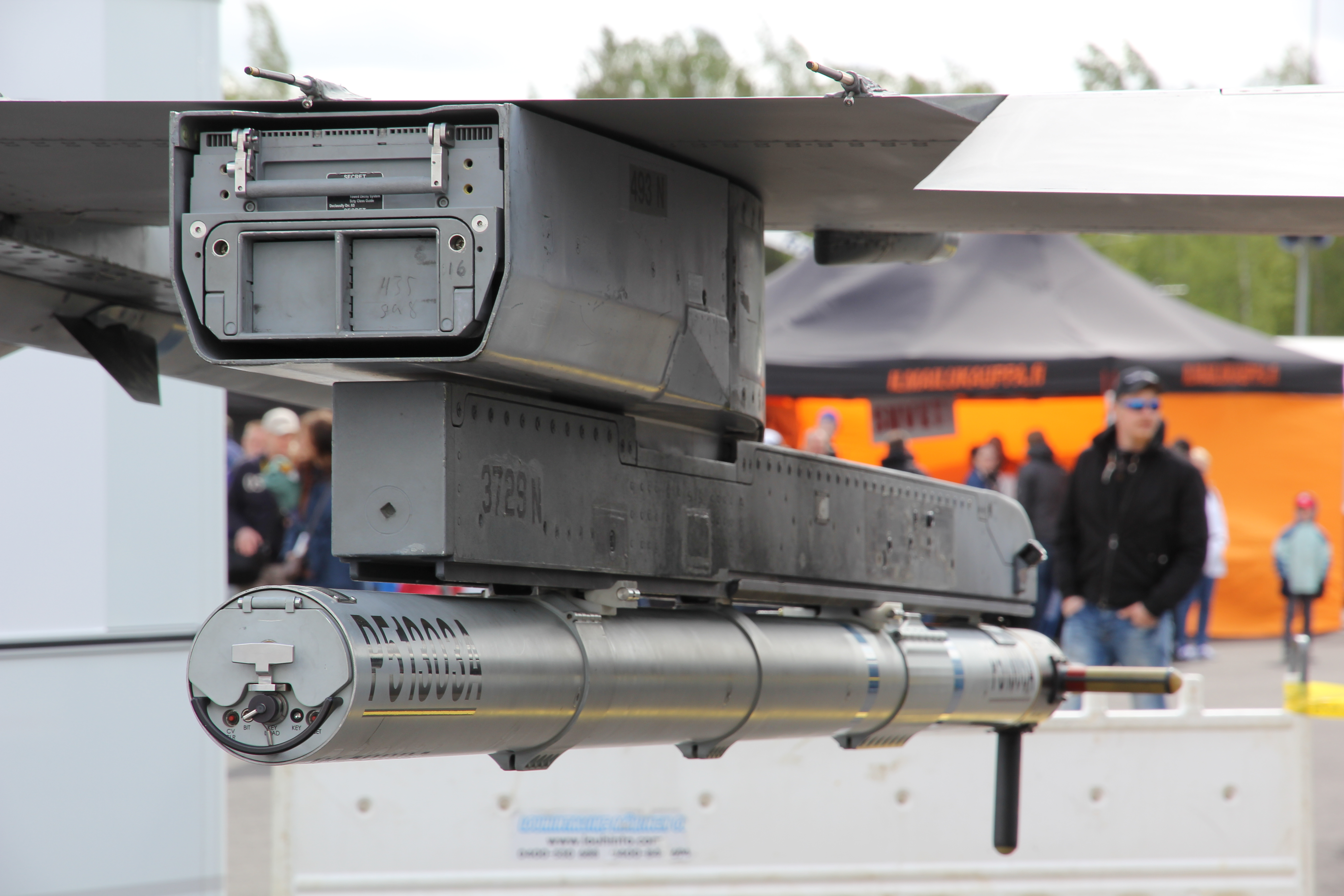
- An ALE-50 towed decoy system in the upper part of an F-16 Fighting Falcon wing pylon
- Status: In use

Manufacturing Info
- Manufacturer(s): Raytheon
- Introduced: 1996; 30 years ago
- No. produced: >1,200

Usage
- Used by military: US Air Force; US Marine Corps; US Navy
- Platform(s): Rockwell B-1B Lancer; F-16 Fighting Falcon; F/A-18E/F Super Hornet

The AN/ALE-50 towed decoy system is an electronic countermeasure system designed and manufactured by Raytheon to protect multiple US military aircraft from air-to-air and surface-to-air radar-guided missiles. The ALE-50 towed decoy system is an anti-missile countermeasures decoy used on U.S. Air Force, Navy, and Marine Corps aircraft, and by air forces of other countries.

The system is manufactured by Raytheon Space and Airborne Systems, now RTX Corporation, at its facility in Goleta, California. The ALE-50 system consists of a launcher and launch controller installed on the aircraft, usually on a wing pylon, with one or more expendable towed decoys. Each decoy is delivered in a sealed canister with a ten-year shelf life.

== Description ==
When deployed, the decoy is towed behind the host aircraft, protecting the aircraft and its crew against radar guided missiles, luring the missile toward the decoy and away from the intended target. In both flight tests and actual combat, the ALE-50 successfully countered numerous live firings of both air-to-air and surface-to-air missiles. U.S. military pilots nicknamed the decoy "Little Buddy". The system requires no threat-specific software, and communicates its health and status to the aircraft over a standard data bus.

In accordance with the Joint Electronics Type Designation System (JETDS), the "AN/ALE-50" designation represents the 50th design of an Army-Navy airborne electronic device for countermeasures ejection/release equipment. The JETDS system also now is used to name all Department of Defense and some NATO electronic systems.

== Operational history ==
The ALE-50 was first delivered in 1996. It is used on the Rockwell B-1B Lancer, the F-16 Fighting Falcon and as recent as 2020, the F/A-18E/F Super Hornet. The ALE-50 has also been integrated into the next-generation AN/ALQ-184(V)9 ECM pod, creating an integrated threat-protection system capable of being carried on a large number of platforms.

The expendable decoys' estimated value is $32,000 each. A production run of 1,048 units were delivered up to October 2010.

In a September 2014 US$9,414,000 (equivalent to $12,802,987 in 2025) firm-fixed-price delivery order, Raytheon's Electronic Warfare Systems in Goleta was contracted for an additional 226 units of ALE-50 Bravo T3F launchers for U.S. Navy F/A-18 E/F aircraft.

As of 2008, the ALE-50 towed decoy was operational on the F-16 Fighting Falcon, F/A-18E/F Super Hornet, and B-1B Lancer aircraft.

== See also ==
- AN/ALE-55 Fiber-Optic Towed Decoy
- List of military electronics of the United States
- US military aircraft countermeasures ejection/release systems
