= Mogh Jangan =

Mogh Jangan مغ جنگان
- Village
- Location within Iran
- Coordinates: 26°03′49″N 57°17′20″E
- Country: Iran
- Province: Hormozgan
- County: Jask
- Bakhsh: Central
- Rural District: Kangan

Population (2006)
  - Total: 198
- Time zone: UTC+3:30 (IRST)
  - Summer (DST): UTC+4:30 (IRDT)

Mogh Jangan (Persian: مغ جنگان, also Romanized as Mogh Jangān; also known as Mogh Changān) is a village in Kangan Rural District, in the Central District of Jask County, Hormozgan Province, Iran. At the 2006 census, its population was 198, in 40 families.
