= AN/ALE-55 fiber-optic towed decoy =

Military aircraft towed decoy system

AN/ALE-55
- Radar jamming and deception towed decoy
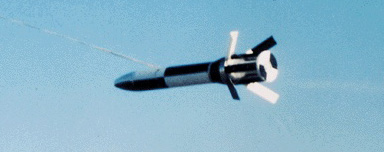
- AN/ALE-55 fiber-optic towed decoy inflight
- Project name: IDECM
- Status: In Service

Manufacturing Info
- Manufacturer(s): BAE Systems Electronic Systems
- Introduced: 2004; 22 years ago
- No. produced: >3,800

Specifications
- Frequency Range: 1–35 GHz (29.98–0.86 cm)

Usage
- Used by country: Australia; Kuwait; Saudi Arabia; United States
- Used by military: See Operators
- Platform(s): Rockwell B-1B Lancer; F/A-18E/F Super Hornet

The AN/ALE-55 Fiber-Optic Towed Decoy, or ALE-55, is an RF countermeasure system defending aircraft from radar-guided air-to-air and surface-to-air anti-aircraft missiles. The system is manufactured by BAE Systems Electronic Systems for the Rockwell B-1B Lancer and F/A-18E/F Super Hornet with over 3,800 units delivered before 2010. As part of the B-1B and F/A-18E/F's integrated defensive electronic countermeasures (IDECM), the ALE-55 integrates with the aircraft's AN/ALQ-214 internally mounted receiver/processor/techniques generator.

In accordance with the Joint Electronics Type Designation System (JETDS), the "AN/ALE-55" designation represents the 55th design of an Army–Navy airborne electronic device for countermeasures ejection equipment. The JETDS system is now also used to name all Department of Defense and some NATO electronic systems.

== Overview ==
The ALE-55 is an electronic warfare towed device system designed to protect aircraft from radar-guided missile threats. The system consists of a launch controller, launcher, fiber-optic towed decoy (FOTD) and an electronic frequency converter (EFC) installed internally within the aircraft. It is integrated with other electronic warfare systems onboard the aircraft to provide active radar jamming and deception using various defensive techniques. In addition, it can also be used in a backup mode as a signal repeater to lure incoming missiles away from their actual target. It is currently in use with the F/A-18E/F Super Hornet, but can be adapted to a wide variety of platforms with minimal modification. According to a report, the unit cost of the ALE-55 was US$38,500 in 2007 (equivalent to about $59,780 in 2025).

== Defensive techniques ==
The ALE-55 provides three layers of defensive jamming against radar-based threats by preventing them from tracking, breaking radar lock-ons, and acting as an alternative target for incoming missiles.

Suppression
The system detects a threat radar in its acquisition mode and tries to prevent it from locking by using various preprogrammed jamming techniques. The onboard electronic warfare package analyzes the threat and determines the appropriate countermeasure, while the FOTD emits the jamming signals from some distance behind the host aircraft confusing the tracking radar.

Deflection
In the case that a radar obtains a target acquisition lock on the host aircraft or decoy, the EFC on board the aircraft analyze the patterns of emissions and determines the optimum jamming technique to break the radar lock. The jamming transmission is accomplished by the decoy. The ALE-55 also possesses the useful ability to send out multiple jamming frequencies countering more than one radar locked on to the decoy or aircraft. Considering the host aircraft carries more than one FOTD, each capable of multiple simultaneous transmissions, the aircraft’s defensive system may ward off several attacks at once.

Seduction
When a missile launch is detected, indicated by the difference in radar signal characteristics and type, the FOTD changes tactics in a last resort attempt to protect the host aircraft. In that last resort, the FOTD changes its own transmission characteristics becoming the target in place of the host aircraft, trying to lure the missile by simulating the aircraft's radar and transmission signatures. As the FOTD transmits this alluring signal some distance in tow of the aircraft, any missile detonation would likely occur away from its true target.

== Components ==
The ALE-55 system consists of four major components. An onboard electronic signal conditioning frequency converter, the EFC assembly, is mounted internally to the aircraft as is a launch controller. The launcher and multiple FOTDs are mounted externally. The onboard EFC analyzes characteristics of radar signals detected by other integrated electronic warfare systems, calculates an appropriate jamming and spoofing signal, then transmits tactical data to the FOTD through a fiber optic cable.

The FOTD has dual high power traveling-wave tubes (TWTs) allowing for enough transmitted jamming power to protect even large aircraft. It is launched with a Raytheon manufactured Integrated Multi-Platform Launch Controller (IMPLC), which it shares with the towed AN/ALE-50 towed decoy. A braking system on each FOTD allows for fast deployment. Once deployed, the FOTD is transmits at frequencies from 1 to 35 GHz (29.98 to 0.86 cm)

== Operators ==
- Kuwait Air Force
- Royal Australian Air Force
- Royal Saudi Air Force
- United States Navy
- United States Marine Corps

== See also ==
- AN/ALE-50 towed decoy system
- List of military electronics of the United States
- List of US military aircraft countermeasures ejection/release systems
