= Gav Bandi =

Gav Bandi گاوبندي
- Village
- Location within Iran
- Coordinates: 25°48′54″N 57°30′18″E
- Country: Iran
- Province: Hormozgan
- County: Jask
- Bakhsh: Central
- Rural District: Kangan

Population (2006)
  - Total: 256
- Time zone: UTC+3:30 (IRST)
  - Summer (DST): UTC+4:30 (IRDT)

Gav Bandi (Persian: گاوبندي, also Romanized as Gāv Bandī) is a village in Kangan Rural District, in the Central District of Jask County, Hormozgan Province, Iran. At the 2006 census, its population was 256, in 38 families.
