= Rabk =

Rabk رابك
- Village
- Location within Iran
- Coordinates: 25°51′36″N 57°34′12″E
- Country: Iran
- Province: Hormozgan
- County: Jask
- Bakhsh: Central
- Rural District: Kangan

Population (2006)
  - Total: 16
- Time zone: UTC+3:30 (IRST)
  - Summer (DST): UTC+4:30 (IRDT)

Rabk (Persian: رابك, also Romanized as Rābk) is a village in Kangan Rural District, in the Central District of Jask County, Hormozgan Province, Iran. At the 2006 census, its population was 16, in 5 families.
