= Shambiran =

Shambiran شمبيران
- Village
- Location within Iran
- Coordinates: 26°03′23″N 57°14′46″E
- Country: Iran
- Province: Hormozgan
- County: Jask
- Bakhsh: Central
- Rural District: Kangan

Population (2006)
  - Total: 117
- Time zone: UTC+3:30 (IRST)
  - Summer (DST): UTC+4:30 (IRDT)

Shambiran (Persian: شمبيران, also Romanized as Shambīrān) is a village in Kangan Rural District, in the Central District of Jask County, Hormozgan Province, Iran. At the 2006 census, its population was 117, in 18 families.
