= KQ-X =

Autonomous Aerial Refueling Drone

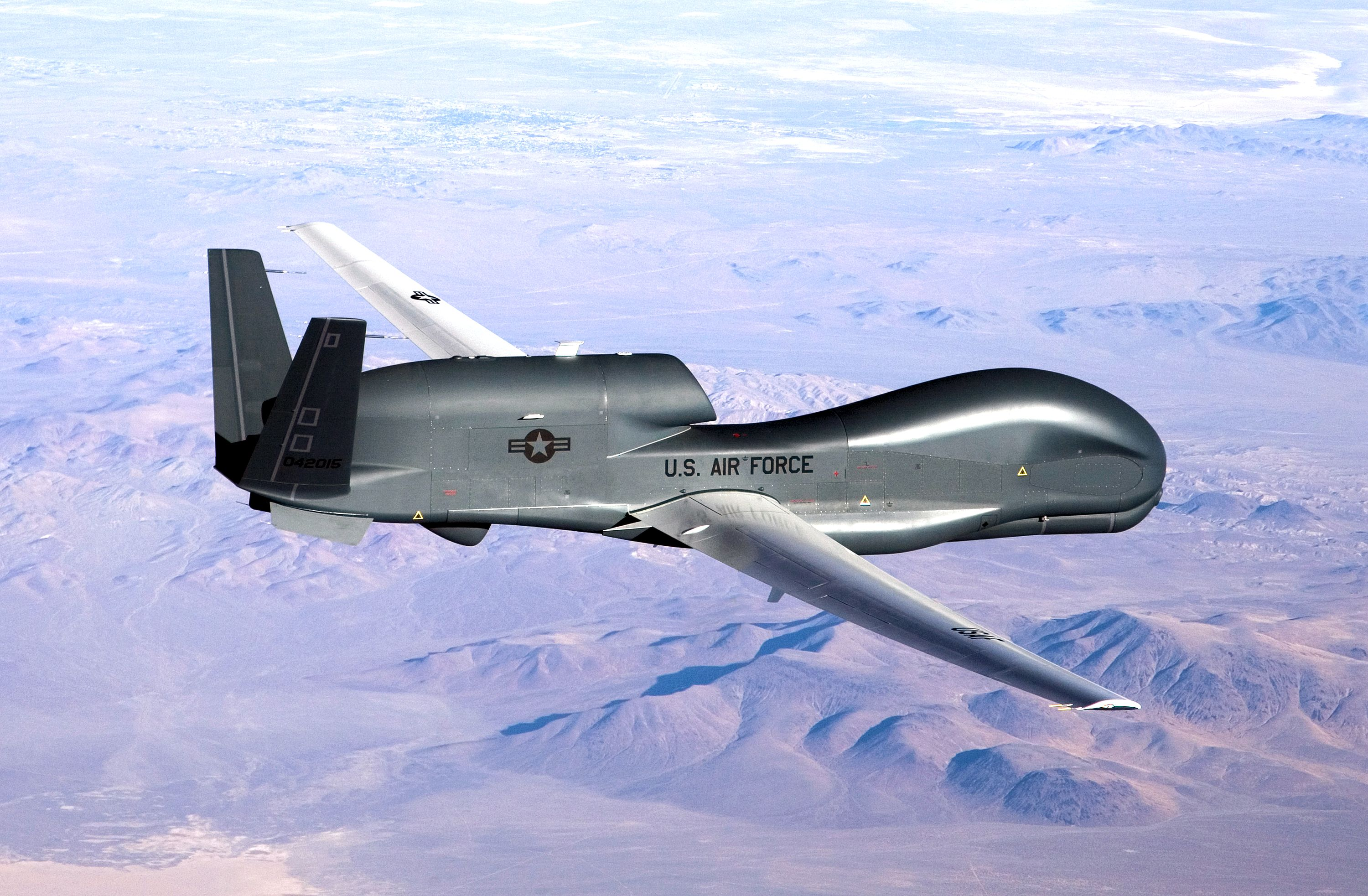
- A Northrop Grumman RQ-4B similar to that used in the KQ-X aerial refuelling trials.

General information
- Project for: Autonomous aerial refueling
- Issued by: DARPA

History
- Initiated: July 1, 2010
- Concluded: September 2012

KQ-X was a $33 million DARPA program awarded to Northrop Grumman on July 1, 2010. KQ-X investigated and developed autonomous aerial refueling techniques using two NASA Global Hawk high-altitude long endurance (HALE) unmanned aerial vehicles (UAVs).

== History ==
Northrop Grumman retrofitted two of the HALE UAVs, so that one aircraft can pump fuel into the other while in flight via a hose-and-drogue refueling system. Several aspects of the KQ-X program were considered revolutionary, not only would the aerial refueling be autonomous, but since Global Hawks are classified as HALE UAVs, the refueling tests would occur at an altitude higher than that typically performed using manned aircraft. The tests would also be the first time that HALE UAVs have been flown in formation.

Engineering work was completed at the Northrop Grumman Unmanned Systems Development Center in Rancho Bernardo, California. Pilots from NASA, NOAA, and Northrop Grumman flew the Global Hawks from the NASA Armstrong Flight Research Center at Edwards Air Force Base, also in California. Sargent Fletcher Inc. and Sierra Nevada Corporation were major KQ-X subcontractors.

Flight demonstrations occurred from January 11 to May 30, 2012. In these demonstrations, the aircraft extended and retracted the refueling hose, demonstrated precision control in formation with manual and automated breakaway maneuvers, flew in formation as close as 30 ft (9.1 m), and autonomously flew in close formation for over 2.5 hours under autonomous control within 100 ft (30 m) (one wingspan) of each other. In a departure from traditional refueling methods, the tanker is fitted with a refueling probe on the nose, which trails behind the receiving aircraft equipped with a hose-drum unit under the fuselage, plugging into the drogue and pushing the fuel upwards. Autonomous aerial refueling was expected to extend the Global Hawk's endurance from 30 to 35 hours to 120–125 hours, set by payload reliability more than engine oil consumption.

The KQ-X program ended in September 2012 without airborne fuel transfer occurring between the two UAVs. The two Global Hawks used in demonstrations were owned by NASA and jointly operated with Northrop Grumman. NASA required the two planes for atmospheric science missions in June 2012 after flight control testing and had to de-modify and reconfigure them to perform hurricane tracking flights after that. Further tests could have been performed, but NASA halted the use of the Global Hawks that June after a Navy operated version crashed. The May 30 flight was the ninth and final test of the program, with the two aircraft flying close at 44,800 ft (13,700 m) to measure aerodynamic and control interactions. Data from the flights were put into virtual simulations that concluded 60 percent of autonomous refueling attempts would result in contact between the refueling probe and receiver drogue. Further unmanned refueling tests were carried out under the Unmanned Combat Air System Demonstrator program with software from the Northrop Grumman X-47B UAV.

== See also ==
- Unmanned Carrier-Launched Airborne Surveillance and Strike
- CBARS
