= Shir Ahan =

Shir Ahan شيراهن
- Village
- Location within Iran
- Coordinates: 25°54′46″N 57°23′24″E
- Country: Iran
- Province: Hormozgan
- County: Jask
- Bakhsh: Central
- Rural District: Kangan

Population (2006)
  - Total: 59
- Time zone: UTC+3:30 (IRST)
  - Summer (DST): UTC+4:30 (IRDT)

Shir Ahan (Persian: شيراهن, also Romanized as Shīr Āhan; also known as Shīr Āhan-e Bīsheh and Shīrāhan-e Bīsheh) is a village in Kangan Rural District, in the Central District of Jask County, Hormozgan Province, Iran. At the 2006 census, its population was 59, in 11 families.
