= Sangari Mach =

Sangari Mach سنگارئ مچ
- Village
- Location within Iran
- Coordinates: 25°49′01″N 57°20′51″E
- Country: Iran
- Province: Hormozgan
- County: Jask
- Bakhsh: Central
- Rural District: Kangan

Population (2006)
  - Total: 205
- Time zone: UTC+3:30 (IRST)
  - Summer (DST): UTC+4:30 (IRDT)

Sangari Mach (Persian: سنگارئ مچ, also Romanized as Sangārī Mach and Sangāry Mach; also known as Kūh-e Mobārak) is a village in Kangan Rural District, in the Central District of Jask County, Hormozgan Province, Iran. At the 2006 census, its population was 205, in 34 families.
