= Tambaseyun-e Kuh Mobarak =

Tambaseyun-e Kuh Mobarak تم باسيون كوه مبارك
- Village
- Location within Iran
- Coordinates: 25°49′37″N 57°20′51″E
- Country: Iran
- Province: Hormozgan
- County: Jask
- Bakhsh: Central
- Rural District: Kangan

Population (2006)
  - Total: 119
- Time zone: UTC+3:30 (IRST)
  - Summer (DST): UTC+4:30 (IRDT)

Tambaseyun-e Kuh Mobarak (Persian: تم باسيون كوه مبارك, also Romanized as Tambāseyūn-e Kūh Mobārak; also known as Kooh Mobarak, Kūh-e Mobārak, Kūh-i-Mubarak, Kuhmobarak, Kūh Mobārak, Qal‘eh-ye Kūh-e Mobārak, and Tampāseyūn) is a village in Kangan Rural District, in the Central District of Jask County, Hormozgan Province, Iran. At the 2006 census, its population was 119, in 27 families.
