= Northrop Grumman RQ-4 Global Hawk =

Unmanned surveillance aircraft

RQ-4 Global Hawk
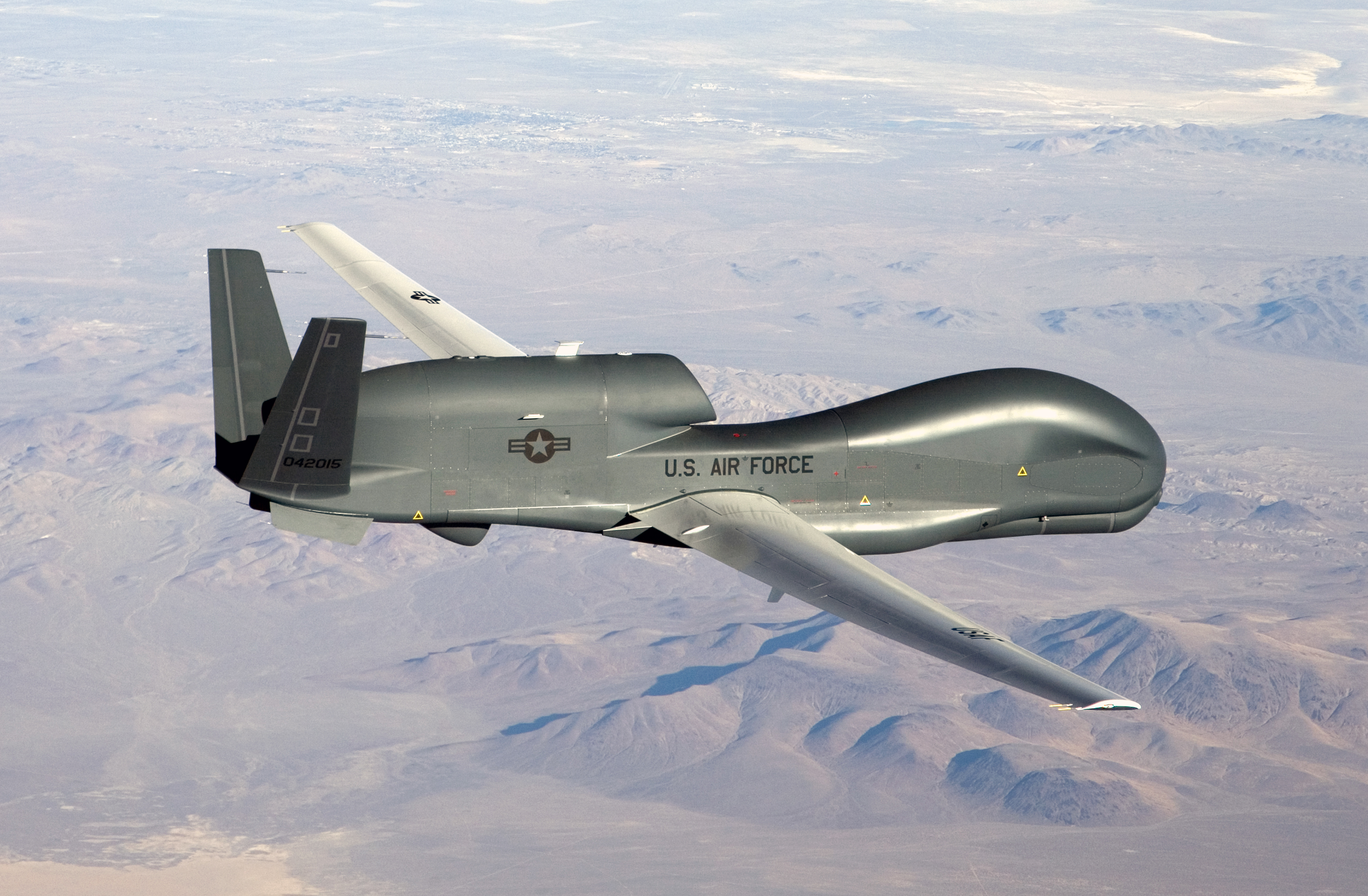
- An RQ-4 Global Hawk flying in 2007

General information
- Type: Unmanned surveillance and reconnaissance aerial vehicle
- National origin: United States
- Manufacturer: Northrop Grumman
- Status: In service
- Primary users: United States Air Force NASA; NATO
- Number built: 42 RQ-4Bs as of FY2013

History
- Manufactured: 1998–present
- Introduction date: November 2001
- First flight: 28 February 1998
- Developed into: Northrop Grumman MQ-4C Triton

The Northrop Grumman RQ-4 Global Hawk is a high-altitude, remotely-piloted surveillance aircraft introduced in 2001. It was initially designed by Ryan Aeronautical (now part of Northrop Grumman), and known as Tier II+ during development. The RQ-4 provides a broad overview and systematic surveillance using high-resolution synthetic aperture radar (SAR) and electro-optical/infrared (EO/IR) sensors with long loiter times over target areas.

The Global Hawk is operated by the United States Air Force (USAF). It is used as a high-altitude long endurance (HALE) platform covering the spectrum of intelligence collection capability to support forces in worldwide military operations. According to the USAF, the superior surveillance capabilities of the aircraft allow more precise weapons targeting and better protection of friendly forces.

Cost overruns led to the original plan to acquire 63 aircraft being cut to 45, and to a 2013 proposal to mothball the 21 Block 30 signals intelligence variants. The initial flyaway cost of each of the first 10 aircraft was US$10 million in 1994. By 2001, this had risen to US$60.9 million (~$106 million in 2025), and then to $131.4 million (flyaway cost) in 2013. The U.S. Navy has developed the Global Hawk into the MQ-4C Triton maritime surveillance platform. As of 2022, the U.S. Air Force plans to retire its Global Hawks in 2027.

== Development ==
=== Origins ===
In the 1990s, the Air Force was developing uncrewed aerial intelligence platforms. One was the stealthy Lockheed Martin RQ-3 DarkStar; another was the Global Hawk. Due to budget cuts, only one of the programs could survive. It was decided to proceed with the Global Hawk for its range and payload rather than go with the stealth Dark Star.

The Global Hawk took its first flight on 28 February 1998, at Edwards Air Force Base, California. The first seven aircraft were built under the Advanced Concept Technology Demonstration (ACTD) program, sponsored by DARPA, in order to evaluate the design and demonstrate its capabilities. Demand for the RQ-4's abilities was high in the Middle East; thus, the prototype aircraft were actively operated by the USAF in the War in Afghanistan. In an unusual move, the aircraft entered initial low-rate production while still in engineering and manufacturing development. Nine production Block 10 aircraft, sometimes referred to as RQ-4A, were produced; of these, two were sold to the US Navy and an additional two were deployed to Iraq to support operations there. The final Block 10 aircraft was delivered on 26 June 2006.

To increase the aircraft's capabilities, the airframe was redesigned, with the nose section and wings being stretched. The modified aircraft, designated RQ-4B Block 20, can carry up to 3,000 lb (1,360 kg) of internal payload. These changes were introduced with the first Block 20 aircraft, the 17th Global Hawk produced, which was rolled out in a ceremony on 25 August 2006. First flight of the Block 20 from the USAF Plant 42 in Palmdale, California, to Edwards Air Force Base took place on 1 March 2007. Developmental testing of Block 20 took place in 2008.

=== United States Navy version ===
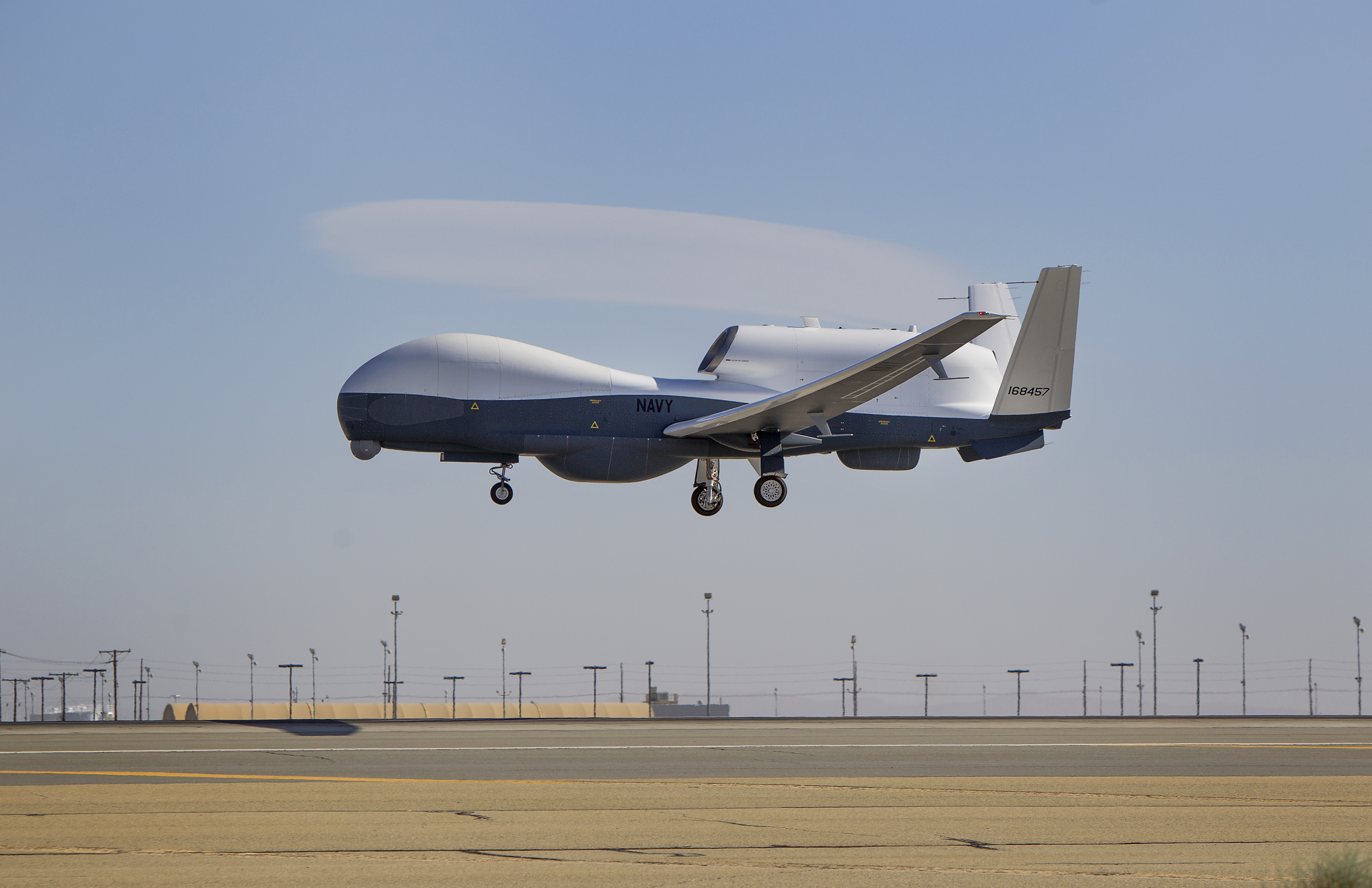
The prototype MQ-4C on its first flight

The United States Navy took delivery of two of the Block 10 aircraft to evaluate their maritime surveillance capabilities, designated N-1 (BuNo 166509) and N-2 (BuNo 166510). The initial navalised example was tested at Edwards Air Force Base briefly, before moving to Naval Air Station Patuxent River in March 2006 for the Global Hawk Maritime Demonstration (GHMD) program, operated by Navy squadron VX-20.

In July 2006, the GHMD aircraft flew in the Rim of the Pacific (RIMPAC exercise) for the first time. Although it was in the vicinity of Hawaii, the aircraft was operated from NBVC Point Mugu, requiring flights of approximately 2,500 mi (4,000 km) each way to the area. Four flights were performed, resulting in over 24 hours of persistent maritime surveillance coordinated with the aircraft carrier USS Abraham Lincoln and amphibious warfare ship USS Bonhomme Richard. For the GHMD program, the Global Hawk was tasked with maintaining maritime situational awareness, contact tracking, and imagery support of exercise operations. Images were transmitted to NAS Patuxent River for processing and then forwarded to the fleet off Hawaii.

Northrop Grumman entered an RQ-4B variant in the US Navy's Broad Area Maritime Surveillance (BAMS) UAV competition. On 22 April 2008, it was announced that Northrop Grumman's RQ-4N had won and that the Navy had awarded a US$1.16 billion (~$1.7 billion in 2025) contract. In September 2010, the RQ-4N was officially designated the MQ-4C.

The Navy MQ-4C differs from the Air Force RQ-4 mainly in its wing. While the Global Hawk remains at high altitude to conduct surveillance, the Triton climbs to 50,000 ft (15,000 m) to see a wide area and can drop to 10,000 ft (3,000 m) to get further identification of a target. The Triton's wings are specially designed to take the stresses of rapidly decreasing altitude. Though similar in appearance to the Global Hawk's wings, the Triton's internal wing structure is much stronger and has additional features including anti-icing capabilities and impact and lightning strike protection.

On 17 June 2022, the Navy brought its last deployed RQ-4A BAMS-D back from the Middle East, ending what started as a six-month experiment but turned into a 13-year deployment. The Navy had acquired five Block 10 RQ-4As and since 2009 at least one had been kept on rotation in the Persian Gulf region. The aircraft accrued over 42,500 flight hours in 2,069 missions; one was lost in an accident and another was shot down by Iran. The BAMS-D was replaced in Navy service with the MQ-4C.

=== Cost increases and procurement ===
Development cost overruns placed the Global Hawk at risk of cancellation. In mid-2006, per-unit costs were 25% over baseline estimates, caused by both the need to correct design deficiencies as well as to increase its capabilities. This caused concern over a possible congressional termination of the program if its national security benefits could not be justified. However, in June 2006, the program was restructured. Completion of an operational assessment report by the USAF was delayed from 2005 to 2007 due to manufacturing and development delays. The operational assessment report was released in March 2007 and production of the 54 air vehicles planned was extended by two years to 2015.

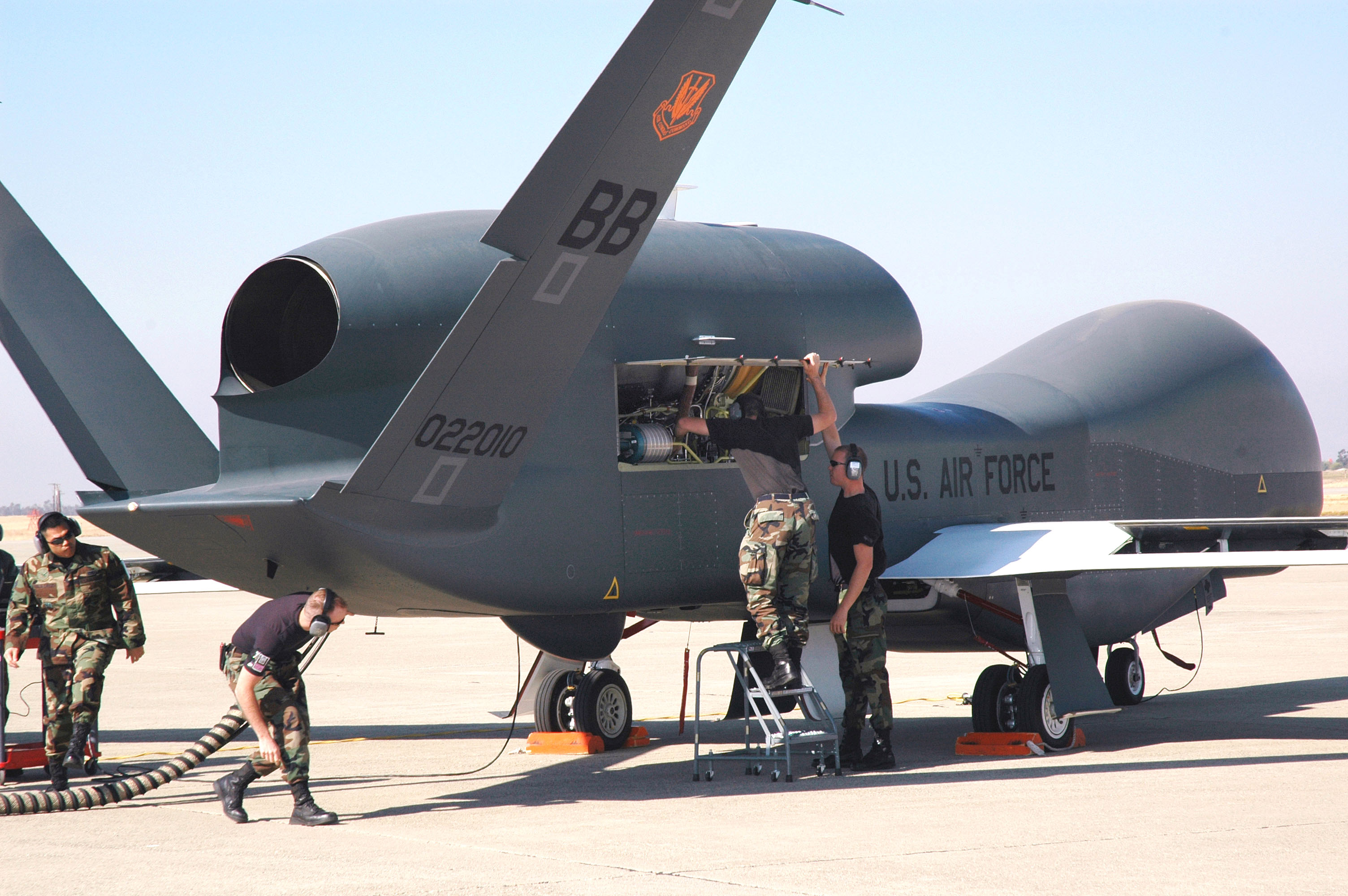
A maintenance crew preparing a Global Hawk at Beale Air Force Base

In February 2011, the USAF reduced its planned purchase of RQ-4 Block 40 aircraft from 22 to 11 in order to cut costs. In June 2011, the U.S. Defense Department's Director, Operational Test and Evaluation (DOT&E), found the RQ-4B "not operationally effective" due to reliability issues. In June 2011, the Global Hawk was certified by the Secretary of Defense as critical to national security following a breach of the Nunn-McCurdy Amendment; the Secretary stated: "The Global Hawk is essential to national security; there are no alternatives to Global Hawk which provide acceptable capability at less cost; Global Hawk costs $220M less per year than the Lockheed U-2 to operate on a comparable mission; the U-2 cannot simultaneously carry the same sensors as the Global Hawk; and if funding must be reduced, Global Hawk has a higher priority over other programs."

On 26 January 2012, the Pentagon announced plans to end Global Hawk Block 30 procurement as the type was found to be more expensive to operate and with less capable sensors than the existing U-2. Plans to increase procurement of the Block 40 variant were also announced. The Air Force's fiscal year 2013 budget request said it had resolved to divest itself of the Block 30 variant; however, the National Defense Authorization Act for Fiscal Year 2013 mandated operations of the Block 30 fleet through the end of 2014. The USAF plans to procure 45 RQ-4B Global Hawks as of 2013. Before retiring in 2014, ACC commander, General Mike Hostage said of the U-2's replacement by the drone that "The combatant commanders are going to suffer for eight years and the best they're going to get is 90 percent".

During 2010–2013, costs of flying the RQ-4 fell by more than 50%. In 2010, the cost per flight hour was $40,600, with contractor logistic support making up $25,000 per flight hour of this figure. By mid-2013, cost per flight hour dropped to $18,900, contractor logistic support having dropped to $11,000 per flight hour. This was in part due to higher usage, spreading logistics and support costs over a higher number of flight hours. In 2015, the RQ-4 was planned to replace the U-2 by 2019, though Lockheed Martin stated the U-2 can remain viable until 2050. As of January 2018, the U.S. Air Force budget for 2018 had indefinitely postponed the retirement of the U-2. In February 2020, the U.S. Air Force submitted budget documents with confusing language suggesting that it could begin retiring U-2s in 2025 but clarified afterwards that no retirement is planned.

In July 2022, the US Air Force announced plans to retire the Global Hawk in 2027.

=== EuroHawk ===
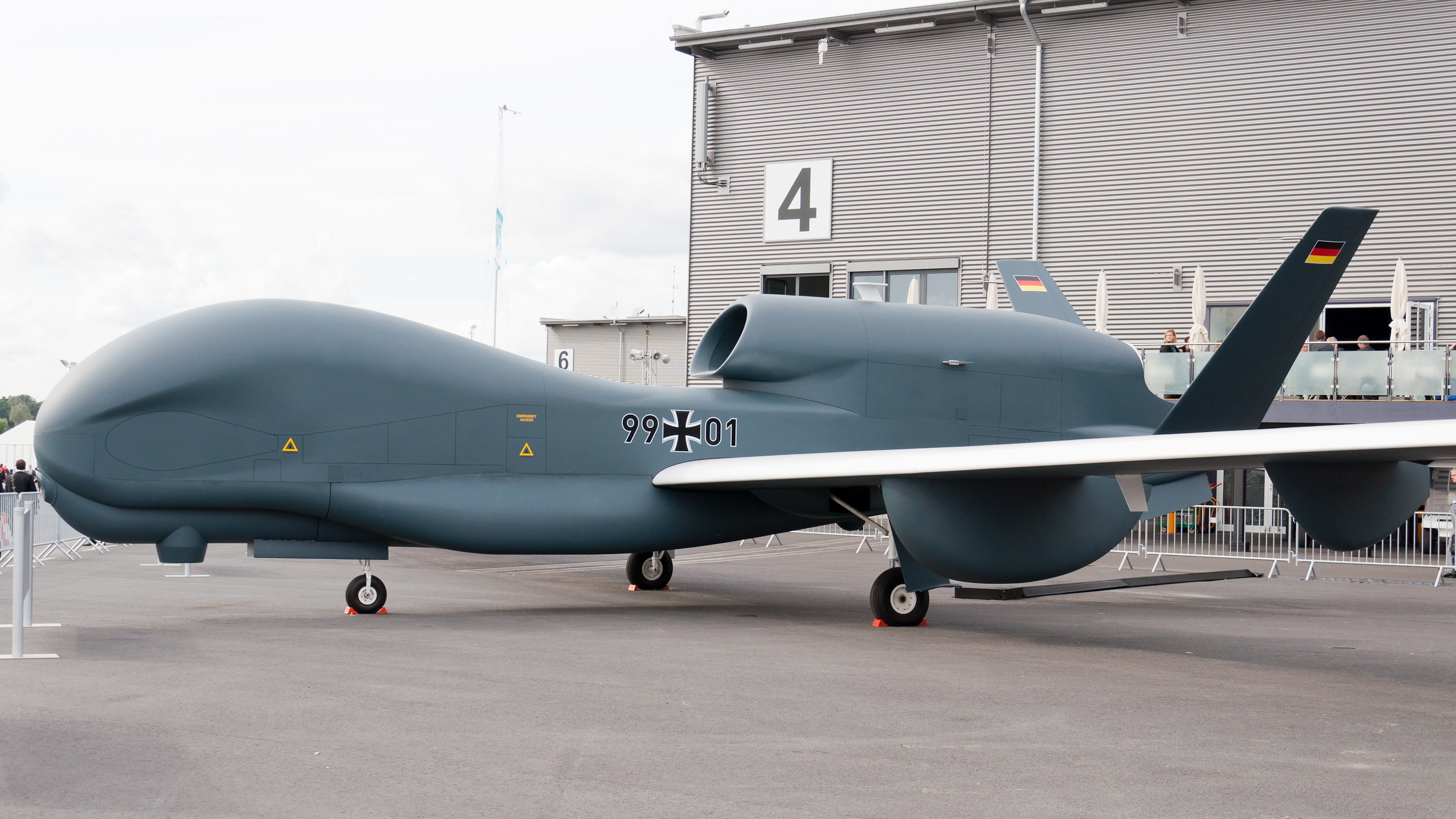
EuroHawk at the ILA 2012

The German Air Force (Luftwaffe) ordered a variant of the RQ-4B, to be equipped with a customized sensor suite, designated "EuroHawk". The aircraft was based on the RQ-4B Block 20/30/40 and was to be equipped with an EADS-built signals intelligence (SIGINT) package; it was intended to fulfill Germany's requirement to replace their aging Dassault-Breguet Atlantique electronic surveillance aircraft of the Marineflieger (Naval Air arm of the German Navy). The EADS sensor package is composed of six wing-mounted pods; reportedly these sensor pods could potentially be used on other platforms, including crewed aircraft.

The EuroHawk was officially rolled out on 8 October 2009 and its first flight took place on 29 June 2010. It underwent several months of flight testing at Edwards Air Force Base. On 21 July 2011, the first EuroHawk arrived in Manching, Germany; after which it was scheduled to receive its SIGINT sensor package and undergo further testing and pilot training until the first quarter of 2012. The Luftwaffe planned to station the type with Taktisches Luftwaffengeschwader 51 ("Reconnaissance wing 51"). In 2011 the German Ministry of Defence was aware of difficulties with the certification for use within the European airspace. During flight trials, problems with the EuroHawk's flight control system were found; the German certification process was also complicated by Northrop Grumman refusing to share technical data on the aircraft with which to perform evaluations.

On 13 May 2013, German media reported that the EuroHawk would not be certifiable under ICAO rules without an anti-collision system; thus preventing any operations within European airspace or the airspace of any ICAO member. The additional cost of certification was reported to be more than €600 million (US$780 million). On 15 May 2013, the German government announced the immediate termination of the program, attributing the cancellation to the certification issue. Reportedly, the additional cost to develop the EuroHawk to the standards needed for certification may not have guaranteed final approval for certification.

German defense minister Thomas de Maizière stated EuroHawk was "very important" for Germany in 2012, then referred to the project as being "a horror without end" in his 2013 statement to the Bundestag. The total cost of the project before it was canceled was €562 million. Northrop Grumman and EADS have described reports of flight control problems and high costs for certification as "inaccurate"; they have stated their intention to provide an affordable plan to complete the first EuroHawk's flight testing and produce the remaining four aircraft.

On 8 August 2013, the EuroHawk set an endurance record by flying continuously in European airspace for 25.3 hours, reaching an altitude of 58,600 feet (17,900 m). It was the longest flight by an unrefueled UAS weighing more than 30,000 lb (14,000 kg) in European skies. On 5 October 2014, German Minister of Defence Ursula von der Leyen was reportedly considering reactivating the EuroHawk program to test its reconnaissance abilities over a long period at altitudes of up to 20,000 m (66,000 ft). Attempting to test the recon system on Airbus aircraft and an Israeli drone as alternate platforms had proven unsuccessful.

The Bundeswehr would use it to detect, decrypt, and potentially interfere with enemy communications signals. If tests prove successful, a carrier would be purchased, likely "similar" to the U.S. Global Hawk. Germany is considering installing the EuroHawk's SIGINT payloads onto the U.S. Navy MQ-4C Triton Global Hawk derivative, as the electronic and communications intelligence sensors would be more difficult to place on other substitute aircraft. It already has icing and lightning-strike protection, and was built with certification over civilian airspace in mind, meeting the STANAG 4671 requirements that had ended the EuroHawk program.

As of March 2021, Germany plans to put the single RQ-4E aircraft on display in the Bundeswehr Military History Museum by 2022.

=== Universal Payload Adapter and new payloads ===
In January 2014, President Obama signed a budget that included a $10 million (~$13.4 million in 2025) study on adapting the U-2's superior sensors for the RQ-4. In April 2015, Northrop Grumman reportedly installed the U-2's Optical Bar Camera (OBC) and Senior Year Electro-Optical Reconnaissance System (SYERS-2B/C) sensors onto the RQ-4 using a Universal Payload Adapter (UPA). Successful testing indicated that all RQ-4s could be similarly retrofitted.

On 14 July 2015, Northrop Grumman and the USAF signed an agreement to demonstrate an RQ-4B fitted with the U-2's OBC and SYERS-2C sensors. Two Global Hawks are to be fitted with the UPA, involving the installation of 17 payload adapter fixtures and a new payload bay cover, as well as software and mission system changes for each sensor. The UPA can support 1,200 lb (540 kg) of sensors and will create a canoe-shaped sensor bay on the fuselage's underside.

Northrop Grumman also expects to receive a contract to integrate the UTC Aerospace Systems MS-177 multispectral sensor used on the Northrop Grumman E-8C JSTARS onto the RQ-4. The MS-177 will replace the SYERS-2 and includes modernized optronics and a gimbaled rotation device to increase field of view by 20 percent. The RQ-4B flew with the SYERS-2 on 18 February 2016.

Raytheon developed the AN/ALR-89 self-protection suite consisting of the AN/AVR-3 laser warning receiver, AN/APR-49 radar warning receiver, and jamming system, along with the ALE-50 towed decoy for the Global Hawk.

=== Range Hawk ===
Although the Global Hawk is being retired from combat use, the Department of Defense's Test Resource Management Center (TRMC) is acquiring them to support the SkyRange program to test hypersonic missiles by 2024. Tests are currently monitored by ships, but it can take a ship 21 days to be positioned and outfitted for use, limiting flights to about a dozen airborne demonstrations a year. By using unmanned aircraft to track hypersonic systems, faster availability and deployment could support a test rate of up to one per week. To perform this new mission, the Global Hawk is retrofitted into the Range Hawk, which involves configuring it to look up rather than down by repositioning onboard avionics and installing new sensors and instrumentation suites to track an overhead hypersonic vehicle. The program will use four Block 20 and twenty Block 30 airframes retired from USAF service. Converted Block 10 Range Hawks supported 10 hypersonic flight tests in 2023, including two tests in spring 2023 over the Atlantic and Pacific Oceans taking place only 10 days apart.

== Design ==
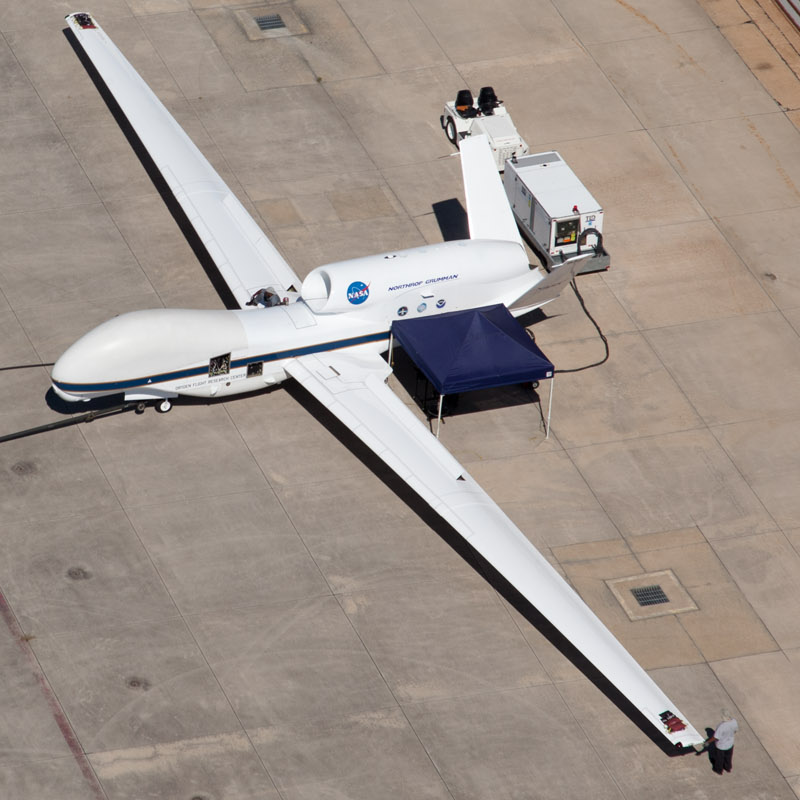
The Global Hawk has a high wing aspect ratio for efficiency, a single Rolls-Royce AE 3007 turbofan on top with the exhaust between its V-tail, and a front bulge housing its satellite antenna.

=== Overview ===
The Global Hawk UAV system comprises the RQ-4 air vehicle, which is outfitted with various equipment such as sensor packages and communication systems; and a ground element consisting of a Launch and Recovery Element (LRE), and a Mission Control Element (MCE) with ground communications equipment. Each RQ-4 air vehicle is powered by an Allison Rolls-Royce AE3007H turbofan engine with 7,050 lbf (31.4 kN) thrust, and carries a payload of 2,000 pounds (910 kilograms). The fuselage uses aluminum, semi-monocoque construction with a V-tail; the wings are made of composite materials.

There have been several iterations of the Global Hawk with different features and capabilities. The first version to be used operationally was the RQ-4A Block 10, which performed imagery intelligence (IMINT) with a 2,000 lb (910 kg) payload of a synthetic aperture radar (SAR) with electro-optical (EO) and infrared (IR) sensors. Seven A-model Block 10s were delivered and all were retired by 2011. The RQ-4B Block 20 was the first of the B-model Global Hawks, which has a greater 3,000 lb (1,400 kg) payload and employs upgraded SAR and EO/IR sensors. Four Block 20s were converted into communications relays with the Battlefield Airborne Communications Node (BACN) payload.

The RQ-4B Block 30 is capable of multi-intelligence (multi-INT) collecting with SAR and EO/IR sensors along with the Airborne Signals Intelligence Payload (ASIP), a wide-spectrum SIGINT sensor. The RQ-4B Block 40 is equipped with the multi-platform radar technology insertion program (MP-RTIP) active electronically scanned array (AESA) radar, which provides SAR and moving target indication (MTI) data for wide-area surveillance of stationary and moving targets.

The RQ-4 is capable of conducting sorties lasting up to 30 hours long and scheduled maintenance must be performed sooner than on other aircraft with less endurance. However, since it flies at higher altitudes than normal aircraft, it experiences less wear during flight. It can survey as much as 40,000 square miles (100,000 km^{2}) of terrain per day, an area the size of South Korea or Iceland.

=== System and ground facilities ===
Raytheon's Integrated Sensor Suite (ISS) consists of the following sensors:

- a synthetic aperture radar (SAR)
- electro-optical (EO)
- thermographic camera (IR)

Either the EO or the IR sensors can operate simultaneously with the SAR. Each sensor provides wide area search imagery and a high-resolution spot mode. The SAR has a ground moving target indicator (GMTI) mode, which can provide a text message providing the moving target's position and velocity. Both SAR and EO/IR imagery are transmitted from the aircraft to the MCE as individual frames, and reassembled during ground processing. An onboard inertial navigation system, supplemented by Global Positioning System updates, comprises the navigational suite.

The Global Hawk's camera is capable of identifying objects on the ground as small as 30 cm (12 in) in diameter from 20 km (66,000 ft) in the air.

The Global Hawk is capable of operating autonomously and "untethered". A military satellite system (X Band Satellite Communication) is used for sending data from the aircraft to the MCE. The common data link can also be used for direct down link of imagery when the UAV is within line-of-sight of compatible ground stations. For dense flight areas the autonomous navigation is switched off and the RQ-4 is remote controlled via the satellite link by pilots on the ground who are supplied with the same instrument data and who carry the same responsibilities as pilots in crewed planes.

The ground segment consists of a Mission Control Element (MCE) and Launch and Recovery Element (LRE), provided by Raytheon. The MCE is used for mission planning, command and control, and image processing and dissemination; an LRE for controlling launch and recovery; and associated ground support equipment. The LRE provides precision Differential GPS corrections for navigational accuracy during takeoff and landings, while precision coded GPS supplemented with an inertial navigation system is used during mission execution. By having separable elements in the ground segment, the MCE and the LRE can operate in geographically separate locations, and the MCE can be deployed with the supported command's primary exploitation site. Both ground segments are contained in military shelters with external antennas for line-of-sight and satellite communications with the air vehicles.

=== Sensor packages ===
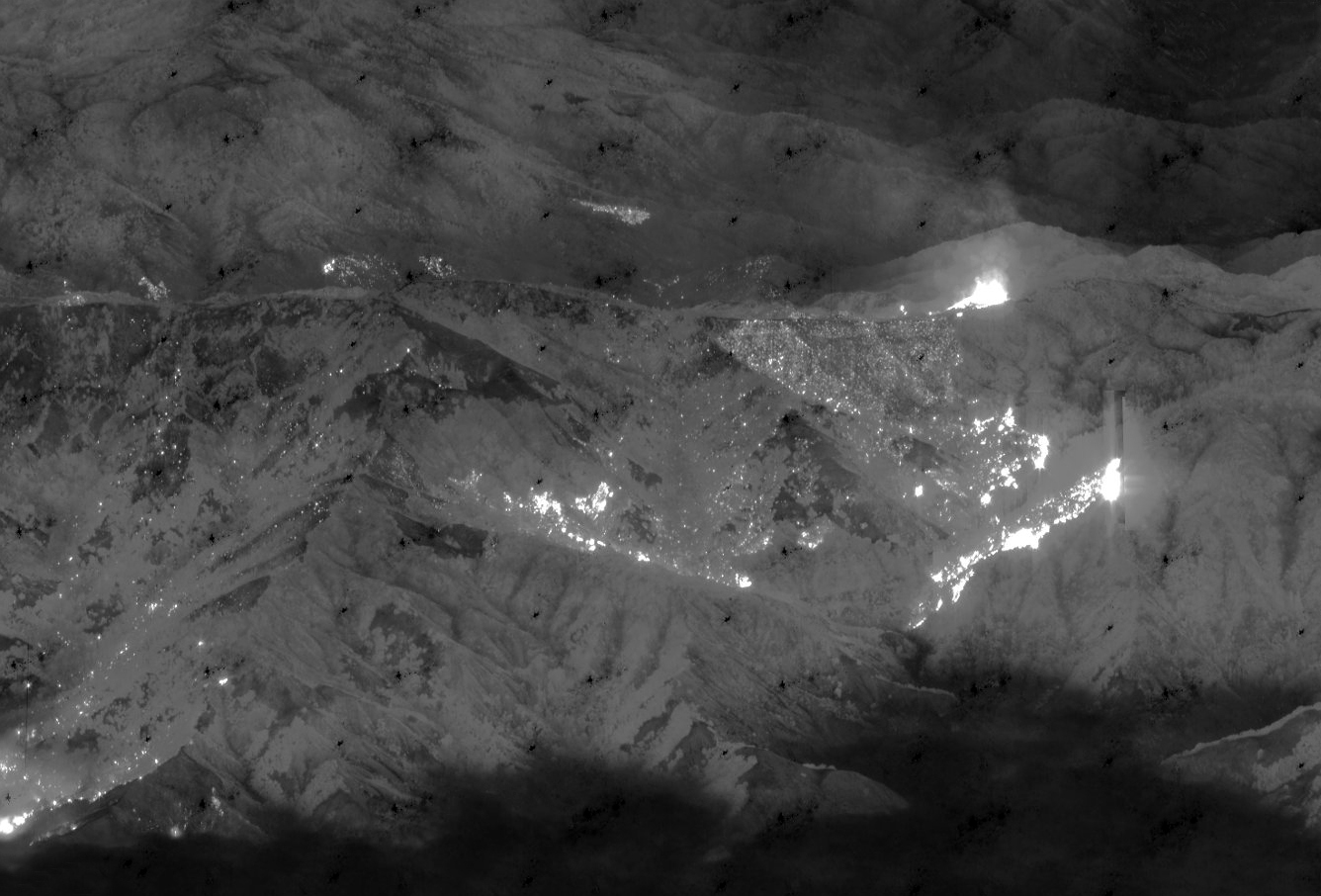
A photograph taken by US Navy Global Hawk with an aerial view of wildfires in Northern California, 2008

==== Radar ====
The Global Hawk carries the Hughes Integrated Surveillance & Reconnaissance (HISAR) sensor system. HISAR is a lower-cost derivative of the ASARS-2 package that Hughes developed for the U-2. It is also fitted to the US Army's de Havilland Canada RC-7B Airborne Reconnaissance Low Multifunction (ARLM) crewed aircraft, and is being sold on the international market. HISAR integrates a SAR-MTI system, along with an optical and a thermography imager.

All three sensors are controlled and their outputs filtered by a common processor and transmitted in real time at up to 50 Mbit/s to a ground station. The SAR-MTI system operates in the X band in various operational modes; such as the wide-area MTI mode with a radius of 62 mi (100 km), combined SAR-MTI strip mode provides 20 ft (6.1 m) resolution over 23 mi (37 km) wide sections, and a SAR spot mode providing 6 ft (1.8 m) resolution over 3.8 square miles (9.8 square kilometers).

In July 2006, the USAF began testing the Global Hawk Block 30 upgrades in the Benefield Anechoic Facility at Edwards AFB. Upgrades include the Advanced Signals Intelligence Payload, an extremely sensitive SIGINT processor. and a specialist AESA radar system, the Multi-Platform Radar Technology Insertion Program, or MP-RTIP. In 2010, Northrop disclosed the sensor capabilities of the new Block 40 aircraft, including the MP-RTIP radar, emphasising surveillance over reconnaissance.

On 14 April 2014, a Block 40 Global Hawk completed the first Maritime Modes program risk-reduction flight to enhance the Air Force's maritime surveillance capabilities. Maritime Modes is made up of a Maritime Moving Target Indicator and a Maritime Inverse synthetic aperture radar (MISAR) that function together to provide ISR information on vessels traveling on the water's surface. During the 11.5-hour flight off of the California coast, the MISAR collected data on over 100 items of interest. Maritime Modes is planned to be integrated with the RQ-4B's existing MP-RTIP radar to detect and produce synthetic aperture radar imagery of ground vehicles.

In November 2015, Northrop Grumman selected the Garmin International GSX 70 weather radar to be installed on Air Force Global Hawks. The GSX 70 is designed to provide operators with real-time weather information, offering horizontal scan angles of up to 120 degrees for better visibility into the strength and intensity of convective activity and a vertical scanning mode to analyze storm tops, gradients, and cell buildup activity. It also has a Turbulence Detection feature to identify turbulence in air containing precipitation and other airborne particulates and Ground Clutter Suppression that removes ground returns from the display so operators can focus on weather. Installation is expected to begin in early 2016. Installation of weather radars on the Global Hawk fleet completed in late 2019.

==== Visible light/infrared ====
The visible and infrared imagers share the same gimballed sensor package, and use common optics, providing a telescopic close-up capability. It can be optionally fitted with an auxiliary SIGINT package.

Some Block 30 aircraft have been retrofitted with the Collins Aerospace MS-177 multispectral sensor, which provides high-resolution imagery across seven spectral bands.

== Operational history ==
=== U.S. Air Force ===
Following the September 11th attacks, the normal acquisition process was bypassed almost immediately and early developmental Global Hawk models were employed in overseas contingency operations beginning in November 2001. Global Hawk ACTD prototypes were used in the War in Afghanistan and in the Iraq War. Since April 2010, they fly the Northern Route, from Beale Air Force Base over Canada to South-East Asia and back, reducing flight time and improving maintenance. While their data-collection capabilities have been praised, the program lost four prototype aircraft out of six or seven to accidents.

The crashes were reported to be due to "technical failures or poor maintenance", with a failure rate per hour flown over 100 times higher than the F-16 fighter. Northrop Grumman stated that it was unfair to compare the failure rates of a mature design to that of a prototype aircraft. In June 2012, a media report described the Global Hawk, the General Atomics MQ-1 Predator and the MQ-9 Reapers "... the most accident-prone aircraft in the Air Force fleet." On 11 February 2010, the Global Hawks deployed in the Central Command AOR accrued 30,000 combat hours and 1,500 plus sorties.

Initial operational capability was declared for the RQ-4 Block 30 in August 2011. The USAF did not plan to keep the RQ-4B Block 30 in service past 2014 due to the U-2 and other platforms being less expensive in the role. Congress sought to keep it in service until December 2016. The USAF had 18 RQ-4 Block 30s by the time of the passage of the National Defense Authorization Act for Fiscal Year 2013, which directed a further three RQ-4s to be procured as part of Lot 11. The USAF felt that additional aircraft were "excess to need" and likely become backup or attrition reserve models.

Despite the potential retirement of the Block 30 fleet due to low reliability, low mission readiness, and high costs, the USAF released a pre-solicitation notice in September 2013 for Lot 12 aircraft. In planning the USAF's FY 2015 budget, the Pentagon reversed its previous decision, shifting $3 billion from the U-2 to the RQ-4 Block 30, which had become more competitive with the U-2 due to increased flying hours. Factors such as cost per flight hour (CPFH), information gathering rates, mission readiness, adverse weather operational capability, distance to targets, and onboard power still favored the U-2.

After the 2011 Tōhoku earthquake and tsunami, RQ-4s flew 300 hours over the affected areas in Japan. There were also plans to survey the No. 4 reactor at the Fukushima Daiichi Nuclear Power Plant.

By November 2012, Northrop Grumman had delivered 37 Global Hawks to the USAF. By March 2014, 42 Global Hawks were in use around the world, with 32 in use by the USAF.

The USAF stated that U-2 pilot and altitude advantages allow better functionality in the stormy weather and airspace restrictions of the East Asia region and its altitude and sensor advantages allow it to see further into hostile territory. In October 2013, the U.S. secured basing rights to deploy RQ-4s from Japan, the first time that basing rights for the type had been secured in Northeast Asia. RQ-4s are stationed at Andersen Air Force Base in Guam, but bad weather often curtailed flights. Basing in Japan as opposed to Guam enhances spying capabilities against North Korea by eliminating range as a factor.

Two RQ-4s moved from Anderson AFB to Misawa Air Base in mid-2014 in the type's first deployment to Japan. They were speculated to have focused on maritime patrol missions. The two RQ-4s successfully performed their missions from Misawa AB during a six-month deployment, with none cancelled due to poor weather. It was the first time that they had operated out of a civil-military airport, sharing airspace and runways with commercial aircraft safely without additional restrictions, usually taking off and landing during quieter periods of air traffic. Officials only stated that they had operated at "various places around the Pacific."

On 19 September 2013, the RQ-4 Block 40 Global Hawk conducted its first wartime flight from Grand Forks Air Force Base.

In November 2013, an USAF RQ-4 deployed to the Philippines after Typhoon Haiyan to assist in relief efforts. It flew from Andersen Air Force Base in Guam to relay imagery of afflicted areas to response personnel and ground commanders.

In planning for the FY 2015 budget, the U-2 was to be retired in favor of the RQ-4, made possible by reductions of RQ-4 operating costs and would be the first time an uncrewed aircraft would completely replace a crewed aircraft. The U-2 will continue to fly through 2018 without replacement.

In May 2014, a U.S. Global Hawk conducted a surveillance mission over Nigeria as part of the search for the kidnapped Nigerian schoolgirls. The Global Hawk joined MC-12 crewed aircraft in the search.

The Global Hawk was used in Operation Inherent Resolve (OIR) against the Islamic State of Iraq and the Levant (ISIL). The aircraft provided real-time imagery and signals intelligence to identify friendly and enemy forces, do long-term target development, and track enemy equipment movement, enabling combatant commanders to act on better information and make key decisions. The BACN version allowed ground troops to contact aircraft when they were in need of assistance, such as close air support.

On 11 November 2015, an EQ-4 became the first Global Hawk aircraft to reach 500 sorties. All three EQ-4s in operation supported OIR. Upon landing, maintainers could complete ground maintenance and make the aircraft mission ready again within five hours. Missions could last up to 30 hours, with each aircraft getting a "day off" in between combat flights. On 1 April 2017, the EQ-4 program completed 1,000 continuous sorties, without incurring a single maintenance cancellation, while supporting OIR.

On 4 April 2016, it was reported that a USAF Global Hawk had completed its third flight over Germany under an initiative (the European Reassurance Initiative) to reassure NATO members concerned over the Russo-Ukrainian war. Germany opened its airspace for up to five Global Hawk flights a month until the middle of October 2016. The Naval Air Station Sigonella, Sicily-based Global Hawk flies over Italian and French airspace and an air corridor through Germany with its sensors switched off on its way to its area of operations over the Baltic Sea.

In 2017, the USAF decided to begin the process of training enlisted airmen to fly the RQ-4 due to a shortage of pilots and an increased demand for the Global Hawk's capabilities. The RQ-4 is currently the only aircraft enlisted pilots are flying.

On 16 August 2018, a Global Hawk, assigned to 12th Reconnaissance Squadron, took off from Beale AFB, California, and landed at Eielson Air Force Base, Alaska for Red Flag – Alaska. This was the first time an RQ-4 had landed in Alaska during a simulated combat training exercise.

On 21 April 2021, a Global Hawk was reported to have made a reconnaissance flight in an airspace off the coast of southern Crimea which Russia had temporarily closed up to 19,000 metres (62,000 ft) from Sevastopol to Feodosiya, issuing a relevant NOTAM. The Global Hawk reportedly departed from Naval Air Station Sigonella in Sicily.

On 22 February 2022, a Global Hawk was reported to have made a reconnaissance flight over Southeastern Ukraine coinciding with a NOTAM order by Ukrainian government and increased Russian military activity. The Global Hawk departed from Naval Air Station Sigonella on Sicily.

Iran claimed that a Global Hawk entered the country's airspace over the Gulf region prior to retreating during the 2026 Iran war.

==== Records ====
On 24 April 2001, a Global Hawk flew non-stop from Edwards AFB to RAAF Base Edinburgh in Australia, making history by being the first pilotless aircraft to cross the Pacific Ocean. The flight took 22 hours, and set a world record for absolute distance flown by a UAV, 13,219.86 kilometers (8,214.44 mi).

On 22 March 2008, a Global Hawk set the endurance record for full-scale, operational uncrewed aircraft UAVs by flying for 33.1 hours at altitudes up to 60,000 feet over Edwards AFB.

From its first flight in 1998 to 9 September 2013, the combined Global Hawk fleet flew 100,000 hours. 88 percent of flights were conducted by USAF RQ-4s, while the remaining hours were flown by NASA Global Hawks, the EuroHawk, the Navy BAMS demonstrator, and the MQ-4C Triton. Approximately 75 percent of flights were in combat zones; RQ-4s flew in operations over Afghanistan, Iraq, and Libya; and supported disaster response efforts in Haiti, Japan, and California.

From 10 to 16 September 2014, the RQ-4 fleet flew a total of 781 hours, the most hours flown by the type during a single week. 87 percent of flights were made by USAF RQ-4s, with the rest flown by the Navy BAMS-D and NASA hurricane research aircraft.

The longest Global Hawk combat sortie lasted 32.5 hours.

==== Downing by Iran ====
On 19 June 2019, a U.S. Navy BAMS-D RQ-4A from NAS Patuxent River flying over the Persian Gulf near the Strait of Hormuz was shot down by a 3rd Khordad surface-to-air missile fired from near Garuk, Iran. Iranian Foreign Minister Javad Zarif said the drone was in Iranian airspace, while the United States maintained the drone was in international airspace 18 nautical miles (34 km) away from Iran.

=== NASA ===
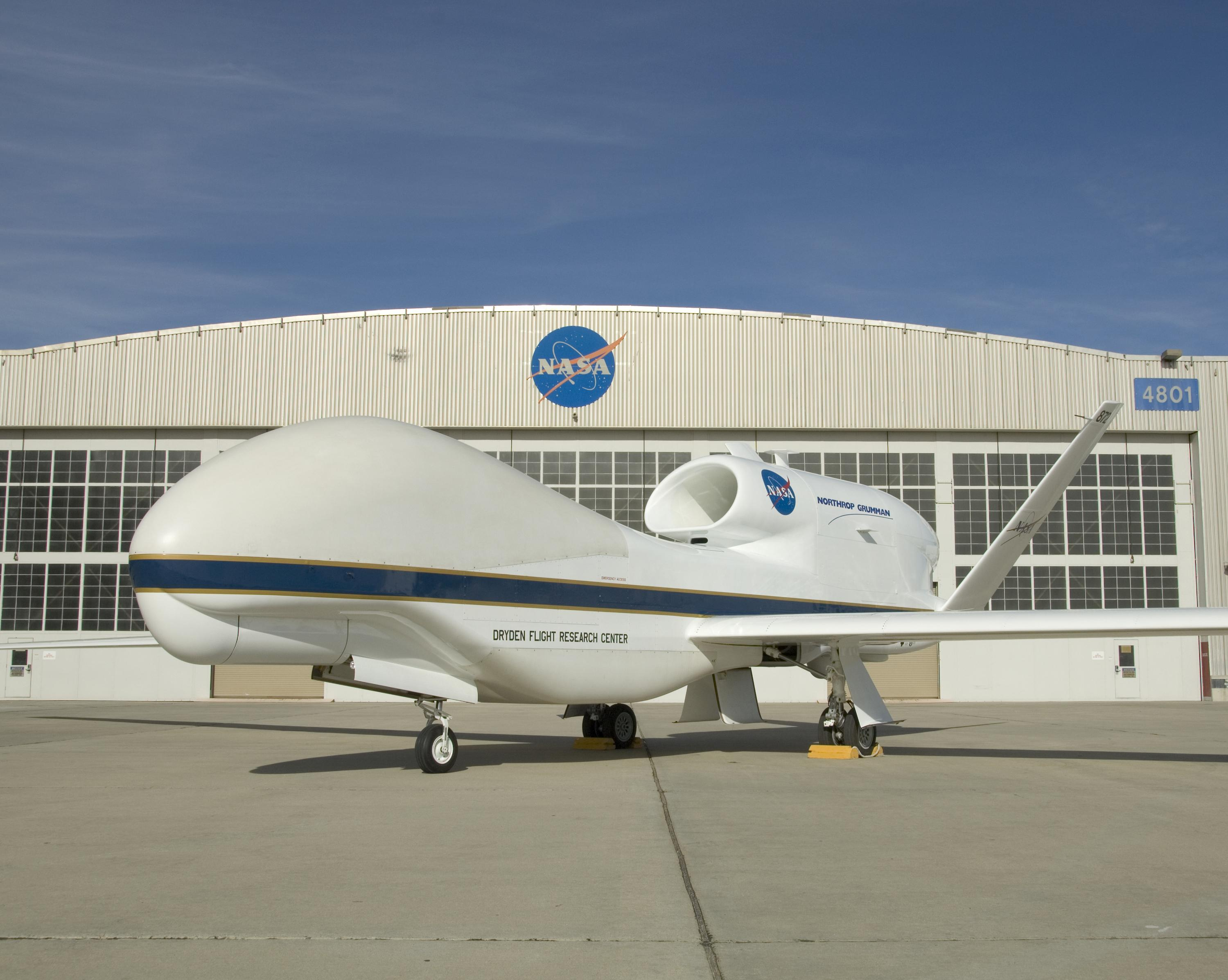
A Global Hawk at NASA's Dryden Flight Research Center

In December 2007, two Global Hawks were transferred from the USAF to NASA's Dryden Flight Research Center at Edwards AFB. Initial research activities beginning in the second quarter of 2009 supported NASA's high-altitude, long-duration Earth science missions. The two Global Hawks were the first and sixth aircraft built under the original DARPA Advanced Concept Technology Demonstration program, and were made available to NASA when the Air Force had no further need for them. Northrop Grumman is an operational partner with NASA and will use the aircraft to demonstrate new technologies and to develop new markets for the aircraft, including possible civilian uses.

It was reported in the March 2010 issue of Scientific American that NASA's Global Hawks were to begin scientific missions that month, and had been undergoing tests in late 2009. Initial science applications included measurements of the ozone layer and cross-Pacific transport of air pollutants and aerosols. The author of the Scientific American article speculates that it could be used for Antarctic exploration while being based in Chile. In August–September 2010, one of the two Global Hawks was loaned for NASA's GRIP (Genesis and Rapid Intensification Program) mission.

Its long-term on station capabilities and long range made it a suitable aircraft for monitoring the development of Atlantic basin hurricanes. It was modified to equip weather sensors including Ku-band radar, lightning sensors and dropsondes. It successfully flew into Hurricane Earl off the United States East Coast on 2 September 2010.

=== NATO ===
In 2009, NATO announced it expected to have a fleet of up to eight Global Hawks by 2012 to be equipped with MP-RTIP radar systems. NATO had budgeted US$1.4 billion (€1 billion) for the project, and a letter of intent was signed. NATO signed a contract for five Block 40 Global Hawks in May 2012. 12 NATO members are participating in the purchase. On 10 January 2014, Estonia revealed it wanted to participate in NATO Global Hawk usage. In July 2017, the USAF assigned the Mission Designation Series (MDS) of RQ-4D to the NATO AGS air vehicle.

The first RQ-4D aircraft arrived at Sigonella Air Base on 21 November 2019. At that time, all five aircraft were undergoing developmental test flights. Initial operational capability was expected in the first half of 2020.

In October 2018, Italy certified five of the drones for use in Sigonella, Sicily, in 2020. However, by 23 December 2019, there were regulatory issues for the Global Hawks concerning shared space between Germany and Italy. German government officials criticized the new drones for their lack of technology to avoid collisions with other aircraft.

=== South Korea ===
In 2011, South Korea's Defense Acquisition Program Administration (DAPA) expressed interest in acquiring at least four RQ-4Bs to increase intelligence capabilities following the exchange of the Wartime Operational Control from the U.S. to the Republic of Korea. Officials debated on the topic of the Global Hawks and domestic UAV programs. In September 2011, the US and South Korea discussed aircraft deployments near its land border to view North Korea and the North Korea–China border.

In January 2012, DAPA announced it would not proceed with a purchase due to a price rise from US$442M to US$899M, and that other platforms such as the AeroVironment Global Observer or the Boeing Phantom Eye were being investigated. However, in December 2012, South Korea notified Congress of a possible Foreign Military Sale of 4 RQ-4 Block 30 (I) Global Hawks with the Enhanced Integrated Sensor Suite (EISS) at an estimated cost of $1.2 billion (~$1.66 billion in 2025). On 5 July 2013, the Korean National Assembly advised the government to re-evaluate the RQ-4 purchase, again citing high costs.

On 17 December 2014, Northrop Grumman was awarded a $657 million contract by South Korea for four RQ-4B Block 30 Global Hawks. The first RQ-4 arrived on 23 December 2019 at a base near Sacheon. The second arrived on 19 April 2020, and the third by June. The fourth and final Global Hawk was delivered in September 2020.

=== Japan ===
On 24 August 2013, Japan announced the Japan Air Self-Defense Force planned to operate one Global Hawk jointly with the U.S. by 2015. On 21 November 2014, the Japanese Ministry of Defense officially decided to procure the Global Hawk instead of the General Atomics Guardian ER; Japan has also been interested in the purchase of three aircraft. The first Japanese Global Hawk landed at Misawa Air Base on 12 March 2022.

=== Potential operators ===
Australia considered the purchase of a number of Global Hawks for maritime and land surveillance. The Global Hawk was to be assessed against the General Atomics MQ-9 Mariner in trials in 2007. The Global Hawk aircraft would have operated in conjunction with crewed Boeing P-8 Poseidon aircraft, as a replacement of aging Lockheed AP-3C Orion aircraft. In the end, the Australian government decided not to proceed and canceled the order. In 2012, a procurement effort for seven UAVs by 2019 was initiated. In May 2013 the Australian government confirmed its interest in acquiring the MQ-4C Triton maritime surveillance variant.

Canada has also been a potential customer, looking at the Global Hawk for maritime and land surveillance as either a replacement for its fleet of Lockheed CP-140 Aurora patrol aircraft or to supplement crewed patrols of remote Arctic and maritime environments, before withdrawing from the joint effort in August 2011. Spain has a similar requirement, and has existing contacts with Northrop Grumman.

The New Zealand Defence Force is studying the Global Hawk, which has the range to conduct surveillance in the Southern Ocean around Antarctica, and in the Pacific Islands. The acquisition process has not moved beyond an expression of interest.

The Indian Navy has expressed interest in acquiring six to eight MQ-4C Maritime Surveillance Unmanned Aircraft Systems.

In September 2018, Transport Canada was looking into buying a former German Air Force EuroHawk for surveillance missions in the Arctic. The EuroHawk cannot currently fly and has no equipment inside such as GPS and navigation tools.

== Variants ==
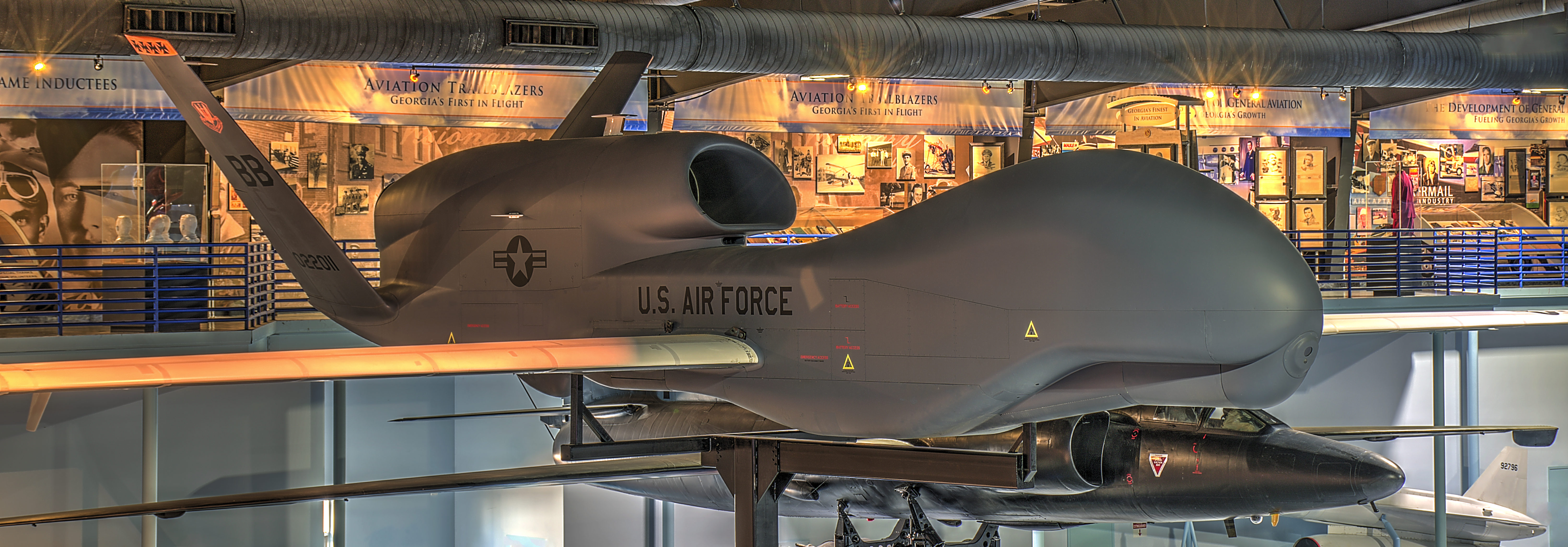
RQ-4A on display at the Museum of Aviation, Robins AFB

RQ-4A
Initial production version for the USAF, 16 built.
RQ-4B
Improved version with increased payload, wingspan increased to 130.9 ft (39.9 m) and length increased to 47.7 ft (14.5 m). Due to the increased size and payload the range is reduced to 8,700 nmi (16,100 km).
RQ-4D Phoenix
NATO Alliance Ground Surveillance (AGS).
RQ-4E Euro Hawk
Version for the Bundeswehr based on RQ-4B and equipped with an EADS reconnaissance payload for SIGINT. Germany canceled its order in May 2013; it received one of five Euro Hawks originally ordered.
MQ-4C Triton
For USN Broad Area Maritime Surveillance (BAMS) role; previously known as the RQ-4N; 4 ordered, 68 total planned.
EQ-4B
Equipped with the Battlefield Airborne Communications Node (BACN) system.

KQ-X
Proposed autonomous tanker variant.

Model 396
Scaled Composites and Northrop Grumman also offered an armed, 50% smaller version of the RQ-4A, known as the Scaled Composites Model 396, as part of the USAF Hunter-Killer program. The aircraft was rejected in favor of the MQ-9 Reaper.

== Operators ==
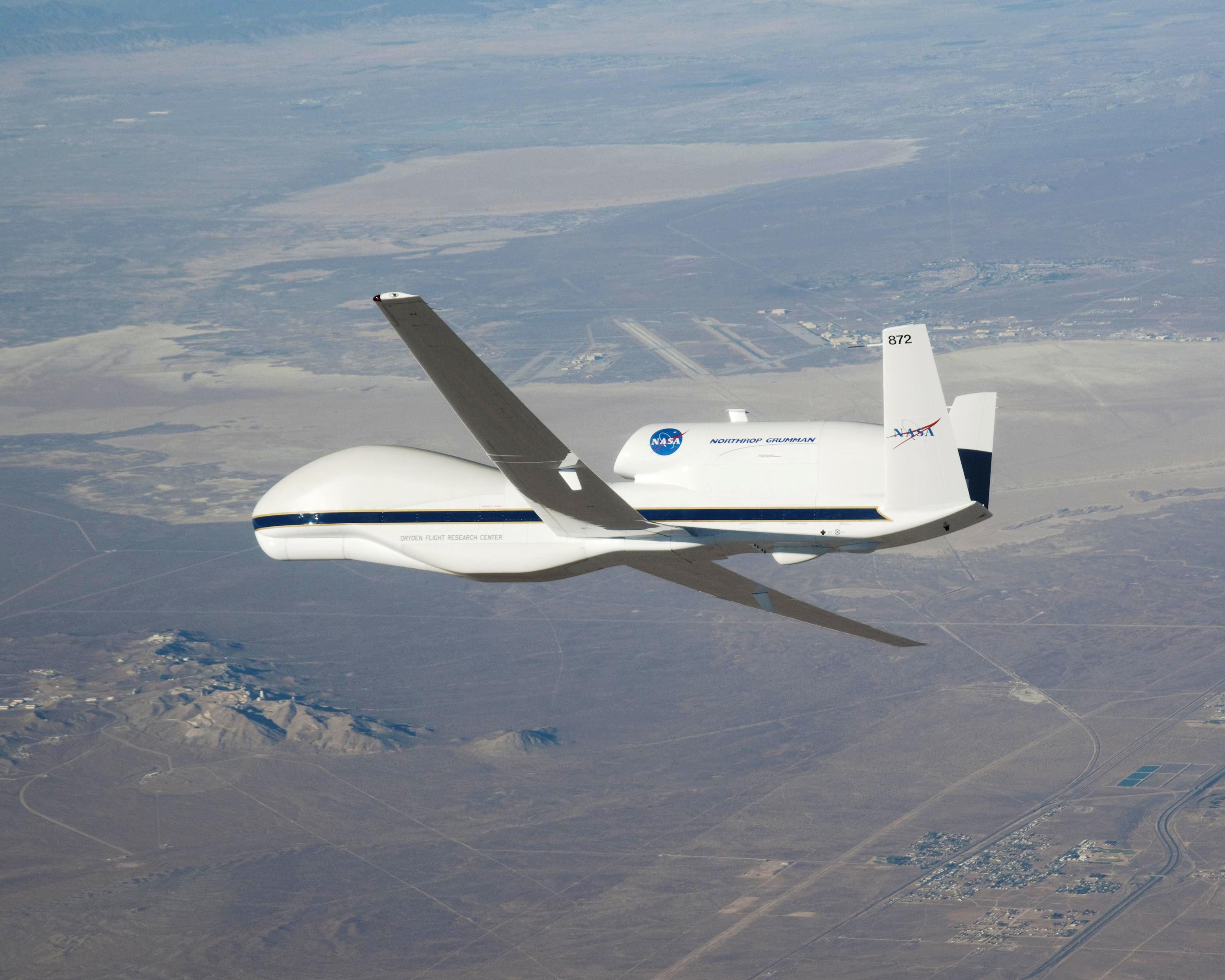
A NASA Global Hawk in flight

Republic of Korea

- Republic of Korea Air Force – Ordered 4 in 2014. First aircraft delivered on 23 December 2019.

Japan

- Japan Air Self-Defense Force – Ordered 3 in November 2018, to be delivered by 1 September 2022. The purchase was made under a contract worth $USD1.2 billion.

NATO

- Alliance Ground Surveillance – Ordered 5 aircraft, first delivered 21 November 2019.

United States

- United States Air Force
  - Air Combat Command
    - 319th Reconnaissance Wing – Grand Forks Air Force Base, North Dakota
      - 319th Operations Group
        - 4th Reconnaissance Squadron – Andersen Air Force Base, Guam
        - 7th Reconnaissance Squadron – Naval Air Station Sigonella, Italy
        - 12th Reconnaissance Squadron – Beale Air Force Base, California (2004-2022)
        - 348th Reconnaissance Squadron – Grand Forks Air Force Base, North Dakota
    - 53d Wing
      - 53d Test and Evaluation Group
        - 31st Test and Evaluation Squadron – Edwards Air Force Base, California
  - Air Force Reserve Command
    - 940th Wing – Beale Air Force Base, California
      - 940th Operations Group
        - 13th Reconnaissance Squadron – Beale Air Force Base, California
  - 380th Expeditionary Operations Group – Al Dhafra AB, United Arab Emirates since early 2002
    - RQ-4B (Block 30), RQ-4B (Block 40), EQ-4B (BACN), RQ-4A (BAMS-D)
- NASA
  - Dryden Flight Research Center

== Accidents and notable incidents ==
- 29 March 1999: USAF RQ-4A 95-2002 crashed at China Lake Naval Weapons Center.
- 30 Dec 2001: USAF RQ-4A 98-2005 crashed while returning to al-Dhafra Air Base, UAE.
- 10 Jul 2002: USAF RQ-4A 98-2004 crashed near Shamsi AB, Pakistan due to engine failure.
- 21 August 2011: USAF EQ-4B crashed southeast of Jalalabad, Afghanistan.
- 11 June 2012: USN RQ-4A assigned to the Navy's BAMS program crashed near Naval Air Station Patuxent River, Maryland, US.
- 21 June 2017: USAF RQ-4B crashed near Lone Pine, California, US.
- 26 June 2018: USAF RQ-4B crashed into the sea off Naval Station Rota, Spain.
- 20 June 2019: An RQ-4A aircraft was shot down by the Islamic Revolutionary Guard Corps (IRGC), near Mogh-e Qanbareh-ye Kuh Mobarak in Hormozgan province, using the Sevom Khordad air defense missile system.
- August 2021: USAF RQ-4B crashed near Grand Forks Air Force Base, North Dakota, US.
- September 2026: JASDF RQ-4B crashed into the Sea of Japan.

== Specifications (RQ-4B Block 30/40) ==
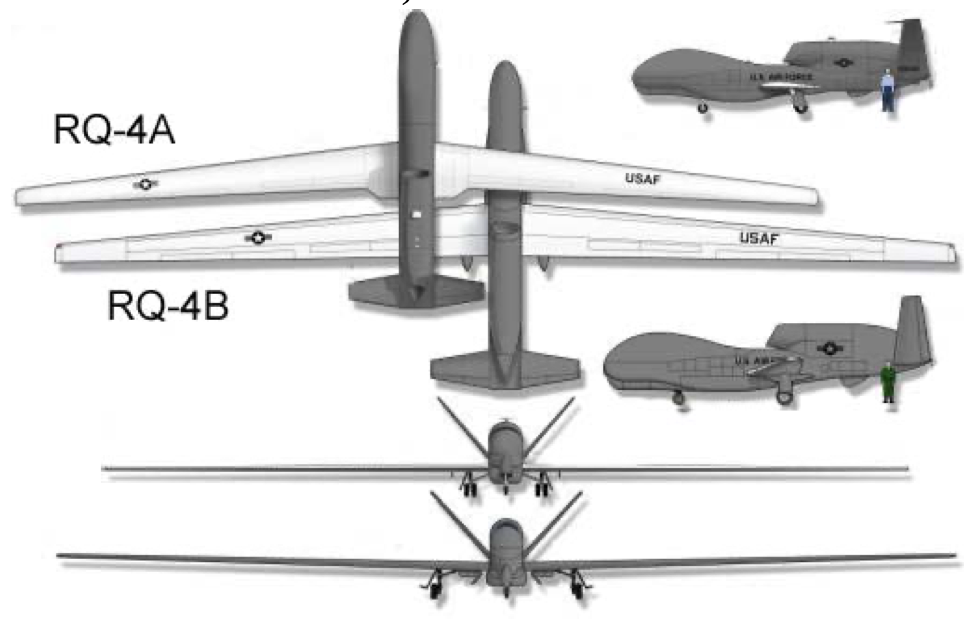
Size comparison for the RQ-4A and RQ-4B models

Data from Northrop Grumman, USAF

General characteristics

- Crew: 0 onboard (3 remote: Launch and Recovery Element (LRE) pilot; Mission Control Element (MCE) pilot and sensor operator)
- Capacity: 3,000 lb (1,360 kg)
- Length: 47 ft 7 in (14.5 m)
- Wingspan: 130.9 ft (39.9 m)
- Height: 15.3 ft (4.7 m)
- Empty weight: 14,950 lb (6,781 kg)
- Gross weight: 32,250 lb (14,628 kg)
- Powerplant: 1 × Rolls-Royce F137-RR-100 turbofan engine, 7,600 lbf (34 kN) thrust

Performance

- Maximum speed: 391 mph (629 km/h, 340 kn)
- Cruise speed: 357 mph (570 km/h, 310 kn)
- Range: 14,200 mi (22,800 km, 12,300 nmi)
- Endurance: 34+ hours
- Service ceiling: 60,000 ft (18,000 m)
- Lift-to-drag: 33

== See also ==
- KQ-X
- Unmanned aerial vehicle
- Unmanned combat aerial vehicle

Related development

- Northrop Grumman MQ-4C Triton

Aircraft of comparable role, configuration, and era

- Chengdu WZ-10
- EADS Talarion
- General Atomics MQ-9 Reaper
- Guizhou WZ-7 Soaring Dragon
- Lockheed Martin RQ-3 DarkStar
- Shenyang WZ-9

Related lists

- List of active United States military aircraft
