= Pelena-1 =

Russian ground-based jamming system

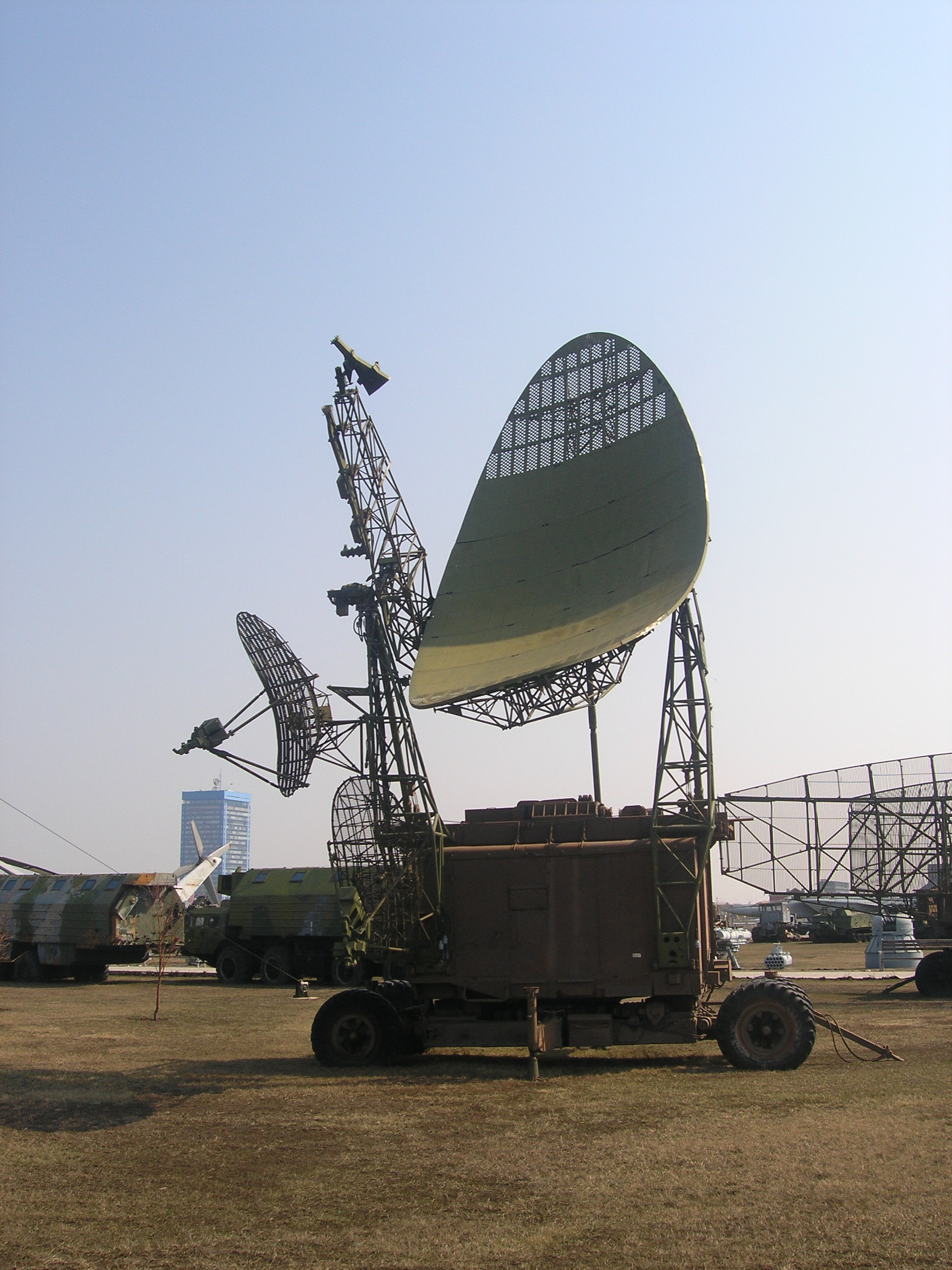
A PRV-17 radar height finder looks very similar to Pelena-1 system, the Tolyatti Technical museum, Russia

The Pelena-1 (in Russian means "Shroud") is a Russian ground-based jamming system.

Designed for jamming the AN/APY-2 radar, the primary component of the airborne warning and control system (AWACS), by automatically inducing a jamming frequency on radar carrier frequencies operating in the fast frequency hopping mode. Pelena-1 disrupts the radar capability of detecting targets with RCS of up to 10 - 15 sq.m. The effective jamming range is up to 250 km.

== Basic characteristics ==
- Jamming sector: deg ±45
- Probability of:
  - radar suppression: at least 0.8
  - system kill by antiradar missiles: up to 0.2
- Scanning range, deg:
  - azimuth: 0 - 360
  - elevation: -1 to +25
- Sector of automatic azimuth scanning, deg: 30; 60; 120
- Power consumption: 80 kW
- Crew: 7
