= Gavan-e Pain =

Village in Hormozgan province, Iran

Gavan-e Pain Persian: گوان پايين
- Village
- Location within Iran
- Coordinates: 26°05′05″N 57°16′57″E
- Country: Iran
- Province: Hormozgan
- County: Jask
- District: Central
- Rural District: Kangan

Population (2016)
  - Total: 991
- Time zone: UTC+3:30 (IRST)

Gavan-e Pain (Persian: گوان پايين) (Note: Also romanized as Gavān-e Pā'īn; also known as Gashar) is a village in Kangan Rural District of the Central District of Jask County, Hormozgan province, Iran.

== Demographics ==
=== Population ===
At the time of the 2006 National Census, the village's population was 881 in 150 households. The following census in 2011 counted 1,002 people in 202 households. The 2016 census measured the population of the village as 991 people in 235 households. It was the most populous village in its rural district.
