= Shir Ahan Shahr =

Shir Ahan Shahr شيراهن شهر
- Village
- Location within Iran
- Coordinates: 25°58′19″N 57°22′42″E
- Country: Iran
- Province: Hormozgan
- County: Jask
- Bakhsh: Central
- Rural District: Kangan

Population (2006)
  - Total: 82
- Time zone: UTC+3:30 (IRST)
  - Summer (DST): UTC+4:30 (IRDT)

Shir Ahan Shahr (Persian: شيراهن شهر, also Romanized as Shīr Āhan Shahr and Shīrāhan-e Shahr; also known as Shīr Āhan) is a village in Kangan Rural District, in the Central District of Jask County, Hormozgan Province, Iran. At the 2006 census, its population was 82, in 20 families.
