= Automated aerial refueling =

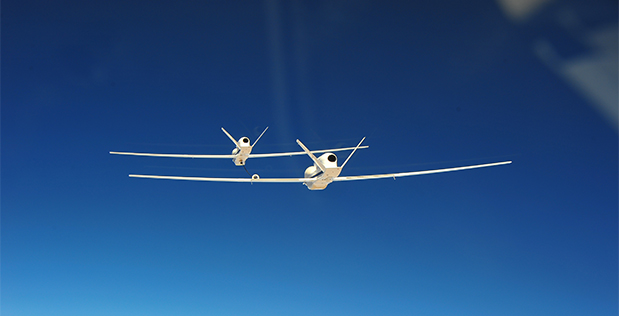
DARPA demonstration of fully autonomous refueling of unmanned air vehicles in 2012.

Automated aerial refueling (AAR) refers to methods for autonomous refueling of crewed and uncrewed aircraft.

== History ==
An Air Force Research Laboratory program was started in 2004 at the AFRL Air Vehicles Directorate. The initial program was the evaluation of technologies that could be used for AAR. The key new concept is the use of precision GPS. The AAR program has since held several flight tests. The important factors were the software and communication systems that kept the aircraft at the proper altitude and speed.

In 2007, the Defense Advanced Research Projects Agency (DARPA), with the help of NASA, demonstrated automatic refuelling from a conventional tanker by a high-performance aircraft. A pilot was on board to supervise, so the demonstration was not entirely automated. It served as the basis for DARPA's Autonomous High-Altitude Refueling (AHR) program which, in 2012, demonstrated the potential for fully autonomous aerial refueling of uncrewed high-altitude long-endurance aircraft. The final test involved two modified Northrop Grumman RQ-4 Global Hawk aircraft flying in close formation less than 100 feet from a tanker, close enough for refueling to take place, at 44,800 feet altitude.

== Automated flight control ==
Appropriate flight control systems (FCS) include sensors to detect the position of the tanker and its refueling drogue along with rules to control the client aircraft. Several different techniques have been proposed for controlling the refueling process. One proposal involves the use of LED beacons on the drogue and an optical sensor on the tanker to determine the drogue's position and attitude. A second involves treating the drogue's position as fixed, ignoring turbulence with the help of a low-pass filter in the control system.
