= Kandijan =

Kandijan كنديجان
- Village
- Location within Iran
- Coordinates: 28°40′52″N 53°03′49″E
- Country: Iran
- Province: Fars
- County: Jahrom
- Bakhsh: Simakan
- Rural District: Posht Par

Population (2006)
  - Total: 264
- Time zone: UTC+3:30 (IRST)
  - Summer (DST): UTC+4:30 (IRDT)

Kandijan (Persian: كنديجان, also Romanized as Kandījān; also known as Kandenjān and Kangān Jān) is a village in Posht Par Rural District, Simakan District, Jahrom County, Fars province, Iran. At the 2006 census, its population was 264, in 57 families.
