= Myer Kangan =

Australian public servant and educationist (1917–1991)

Myer Kangan AO OBE (12 July 1917 – 4 October 1991) was an Australian public servant and educationist, who is considered the founder of the technical and further education (TAFE) system after he conducted an inquiry into technical education in Australia on behalf of the Whitlam government.

Kangan was born in Brisbane, Queensland in 1917 and was of Russian Jewish descent. He attended Brisbane State High School, and then graduated with a Bachelor of Arts from the University of Queensland. He joined the Commonwealth public service during World War II on an aircraft design project, and later joined the Department of Labour.

In 1973, the federal minister for education, Kim Beazley, agreed to a proposal by the Technical Teachers' Association of Australia to hold an inquiry into technical education in Australia. Beazley convened the Australian Committee on Technical and Further Education, and appointed Kangan—then a senior public servant with the Department of Labour—as the chair. The Kangan Report, produced in 1974, provided a blueprint for the development of TAFE systems across the country over the next fifteen years, and emphasised individual development and free choice of vocational needs.

After his retirement, Kangan founded the Jewish Centre on Ageing in Sydney, for elderly members of the Jewish community to continue living in a traditional manner outside of nursing homes. He died of heart disease on 4 October 1991, aged 74. The Victorian TAFE college Kangan Institute was named after him in honour of his contribution to technical and further education.
