= Mogh-e Qanbareh-ye Kuh Mobarak =

Mogh-e Qanbareh-ye Kuh Mobarak مغ قنبره كوه مبارك
- Village
- Location within Iran
- Coordinates: 25°50′09″N 57°20′30″E
- Country: Iran
- Province: Hormozgan
- County: Jask
- Bakhsh: Central
- Rural District: Kangan

Population (2006)
  - Total: 160
- Time zone: UTC+3:30 (IRST)
  - Summer (DST): UTC+4:30 (IRDT)

Mogh-e Qanbareh-ye Kuh Mobarak (Persian: مغ قنبره كوه مبارك, also Romanized as Mogh-e Qanbareh-ye Kūh Mobārak; also known as Kūh-e Mobārak and Mogh-e Qanbareh) is a village in Kangan Rural District, in the Central District of Jask County, Hormozgan Province, Iran. At the 2006 census, its population was 160, in 30 families.
