= Kangan Institute =

TAFE provider in Melbourne, Australia

- Motto: Bound to industry. Bound to succeed.
- Type: TAFE Institute
- Established: 1997 with historical antecedents from 1925
- CEO: Sally Curtain
- Administrative staff: 1500
- Students: 30000
- Location: Melbourne, Victoria, Australia
- Campus: Broadmeadows, Docklands, Richmond, Moonee Ponds, Essendon
- Colors: Yellow, Black
- Website: http://www.kangan.edu.au/

Kangan Institute is a TAFE (technical and further education) provider in Melbourne, Australia.

== History ==
Kangan Institute was established as the Broadmeadows College of TAFE on 28 February 1986, when it was formally opened by Prime Minister Bob Hawke. It was originally built to cater for 3000 students at a cost of $13.5 million. It subsequently acquired a series of other campuses in its first decade, including at Avondale Heights, Essendon and Moreland.

In August 1995, the institution was renamed the Kangan Institute of TAFE in honour of Myer Kangan, the founder of the TAFE system in Australia. On 1 July 1997, it merged with the John Batman College of TAFE to form Kangan Batman TAFE. The merger resulted in the closure of the former John Batman TAFE's campus in Gaffney Street, Coburg, but the amalgamated body expanded again in 1998 when it absorbed the Richmond Automotive Campus of Barton TAFE after a major state government review.

The Avondale Heights campus closed in 2005. The "Automotive Centre of Excellence" campus at Docklands initially opened in September 2006; the completion of the three-stage Docklands development in 2011 resulted in the closure of the remaining Coburg campus (Dawson Street). The organisation reverted to the "Kangan Institute" name in 2010, dropping the reference to "Batman" from the 1997 merger.

In 2014, it formally merged with Bendigo TAFE to form the Bendigo Kangan Institute. The two organisations retained their separate operational branding, but formed a shared administration based in Bendigo. The then state opposition Labor Party and the Australian Education Union criticised the merger over process and funding concerns.

== Campuses ==
Kangan Institute operates five campuses: Broadmeadows, Essendon, a health campus at Moonee Ponds, a creative industries campus in Richmond and the Automotive Centre of Excellence in Docklands.
