= Pazard, Jask =

Pazard پازرد
- Village
- Location within Iran
- Coordinates: 25°51′31″N 57°29′21″E
- Country: Iran
- Province: Hormozgan
- County: Jask
- Bakhsh: Central
- Rural District: Kangan

Population (2006)
  - Total: 166
- Time zone: UTC+3:30 (IRST)
  - Summer (DST): UTC+4:30 (IRDT)

Pazard (Persian: پازرد, also Romanized as Pāzard; also known as Kangān-e Naşrī) is a village in Kangan Rural District, in the Central District of Jask County, Hormozgan Province, Iran. At the 2006 census, its population was 166, in 29 families.
