= Weapons platform =

Structure that can carry weapons

A weapons platform is generally any structure, vehicle or mechanism on which a weapon can be installed (via various mounting mechanisms) for optimal stability and performance. The mounted weapons, the platform and all other associated supporting equipments together form the weapon system.

In more general use, a weapons platform could be structured around a gun, such as a gun turret on a ship, or bracing on an aircraft. For example, a jet aircraft is a weapons platform for missiles, bombs or autocannons, and the resultant weapon system is the fighter jet; a motorboat can serve as a weapons platform for automatic weapons, torpedoes and flamethrowers, resulting in weapon systems such as gunboats and fast attack crafts. Land vehicles, either wheeled, tracked or mixed, are also considered weapons platforms for grenade launchers, machine guns, recoilless guns and some missile launchers, which transform the vehicles into weapon systems such as armored cars (such as the Humvee), IFVs and technicals (improvised from civilian pickup trucks). In addition, artificial satellites have been proposed as potential space weapon platforms. These satellites could carry an arsenal of weapons, such as to threaten other countries with the possibility of an orbital nuclear strike (see Rods from God).

The earliest weapons platforms were chariots, followed by war wagons. The ancient Greek Helepolis, a massive siege tower which mounted catapults, could also be considered a weapons platform. The next attempt to mount weapons on platforms was made at sea, with catapults and eventually cannon mounted on their final form as ships of the line before the advent of ironclad warships mounting turrets.

On land, the attempt to mount weapons on mobile platforms in the modern period was first made with railway guns. These, as forms of artillery, were the last vestiges of development of the super-weapon thinking before the advent of the tanks that changed the use of weapons platforms in warfare, although the largest railway guns were still used during the Second World War on the Eastern Front.
