= Kangan, South Khorasan =

Kangan كنگان
- Village
- Location within Iran
- Coordinates: 32°40′59″N 59°52′19″E
- Country: Iran
- Province: South Khorasan
- County: Sarbisheh
- Bakhsh: Central
- Rural District: Momenabad

Population (2006)
  - Total: 160
- Time zone: UTC+3:30 (IRST)
  - Summer (DST): UTC+4:30 (IRDT)

Kangan (Persian: كنگان, also Romanized as Kangān) is a village in Momenabad Rural District, in the Central District of Sarbisheh County, South Khorasan Province, Iran. At the 2006 census its population was 160 in 53 families.
