= Kangan, Hormozgan =

Village in Hormozgan province, Iran

Kangan Persian: گنگان
- Village
- Location within Iran
- Coordinates: 25°51′46″N 57°27′44″E
- Country: Iran
- Province: Hormozgan
- County: Jask
- District: Central
- Rural District: Kangan

Population (2016)
  - Total: 509
- Time zone: UTC+3:30 (IRST)

Kangan (Persian: گنگان) (Note: Also romanized as Kangān; also known as Gangān and Gankān) is a village in, and the capital of, Kangan Rural District of the Central District of Jask County, Hormozgan province, Iran.

== Demographics ==
=== Population ===
At the time of the 2006 National Census, the village's population was 213 in 47 households. The following census in 2011 counted 499 people in 66 households. The 2016 census measured the population of the village as 509 people in 96 households.
