= Kangan Rural District =

Rural district in Hormozgan province, Iran

Kangan Rural District Persian: دهستان كنگان
- Rural District
- Location within Iran
- Coordinates: 25°58′18″N 57°28′26″E
- Country: Iran
- Province: Hormozgan
- County: Jask
- District: Central
- Capital: Kangan

Population (2016)
  - Total: 7,421
- Time zone: UTC+3:30 (IRST)

Kangan Rural District (Persian: دهستان كنگان) is in the Central District of Jask County, Hormozgan province, Iran. Its capital is the village of Kangan.

== Demographics ==
=== Population ===
At the time of the 2006 National Census, the rural district's population was 6,121 in 1,080 households. There were 7,069 inhabitants in 1,438 households at the following census of 2011. The 2016 census measured the population of the rural district as 7,421 in 1,858 households. The most populous of its 30 villages was Gavan-e Pain, with 991 people.
