= Garuk =

Garuk or Goruk (Persian: گروك) may refer to:

- Garuk, Hormozgan
- Garuk-e Bala, Hormozgan Province
- Garuk-e Pain, Hormozgan Province
- Garuk, Narmashir, Kerman Province
- Garuk, Ravar, Kerman Province
- Garuk, Eskelabad, Khash County, Sistan and Baluchestan Province
- Garuk, South Khorasan
