= Garak, Iran =

Garak or Gorak (Persian: گرك) may refer to:

- Garak, Hamadan, a village in Hamadan Province, Iran
- Garak, Kerman, a village in Kerman Province, Iran
- Garak, Khuzestan, a village in Khuzestan Province, Iran
- Gorak, Kohgiluyeh and Boyer-Ahmad, a village in Kohgiluyeh and Boyer-Ahmad Province, Iran
- Garak-e Bala, a village in Hormozgan Province, Iran
- Garak-e Pain, a village in Hormozgan Province, Iran
