= Fabrykant Oak =

Oak tree in Łódź, Poland

- Dąb Fabrykant
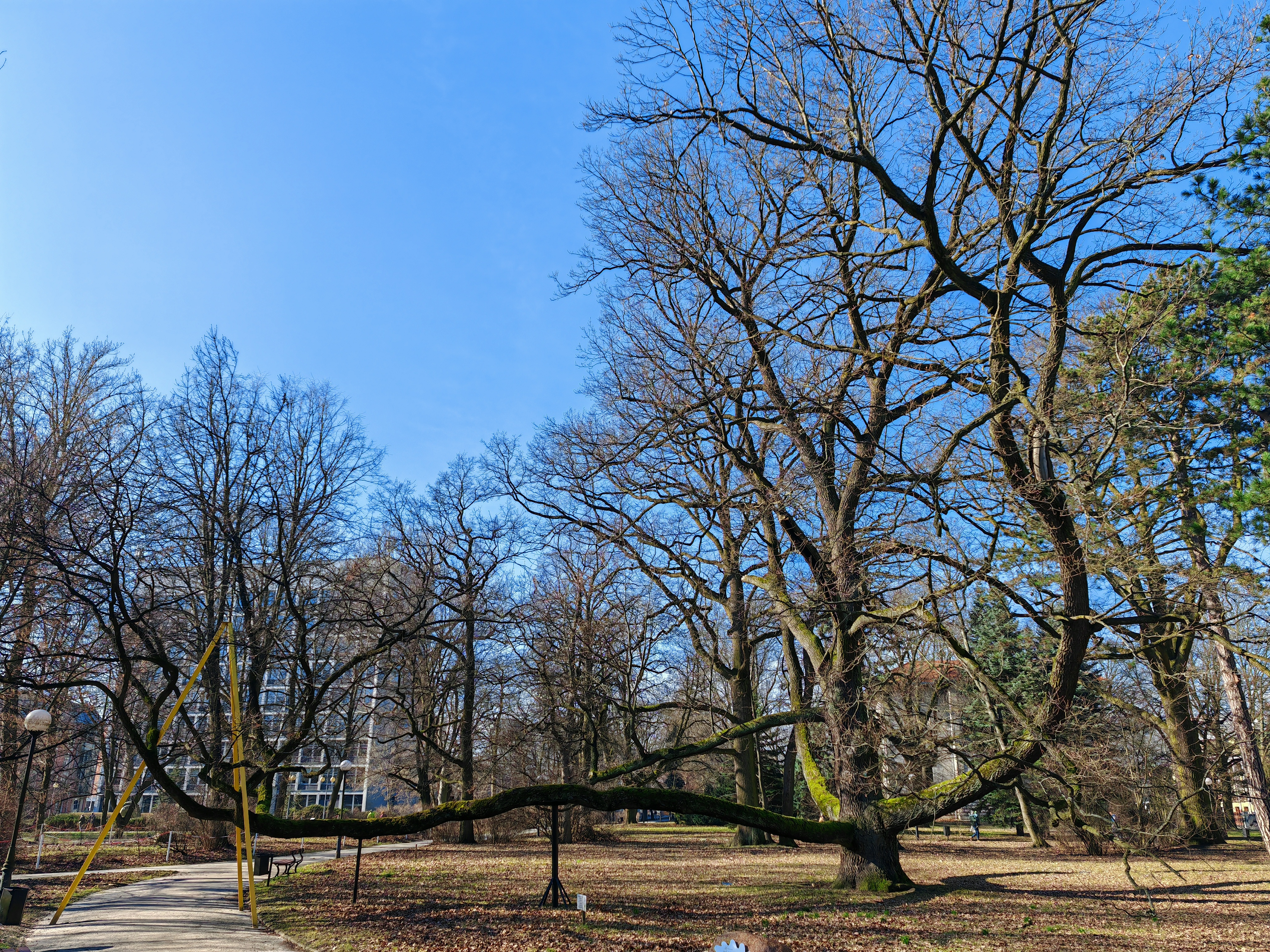
- Interactive map of Fabrykant Oak
- Location: Łódź, Poland
- Coordinates: 51°44′54.80″N 19°27′15.77″E
- Type: natural monument, pedunculate oak
- Height: 455 cm (14.93 ft)
- Inauguration date: 1990

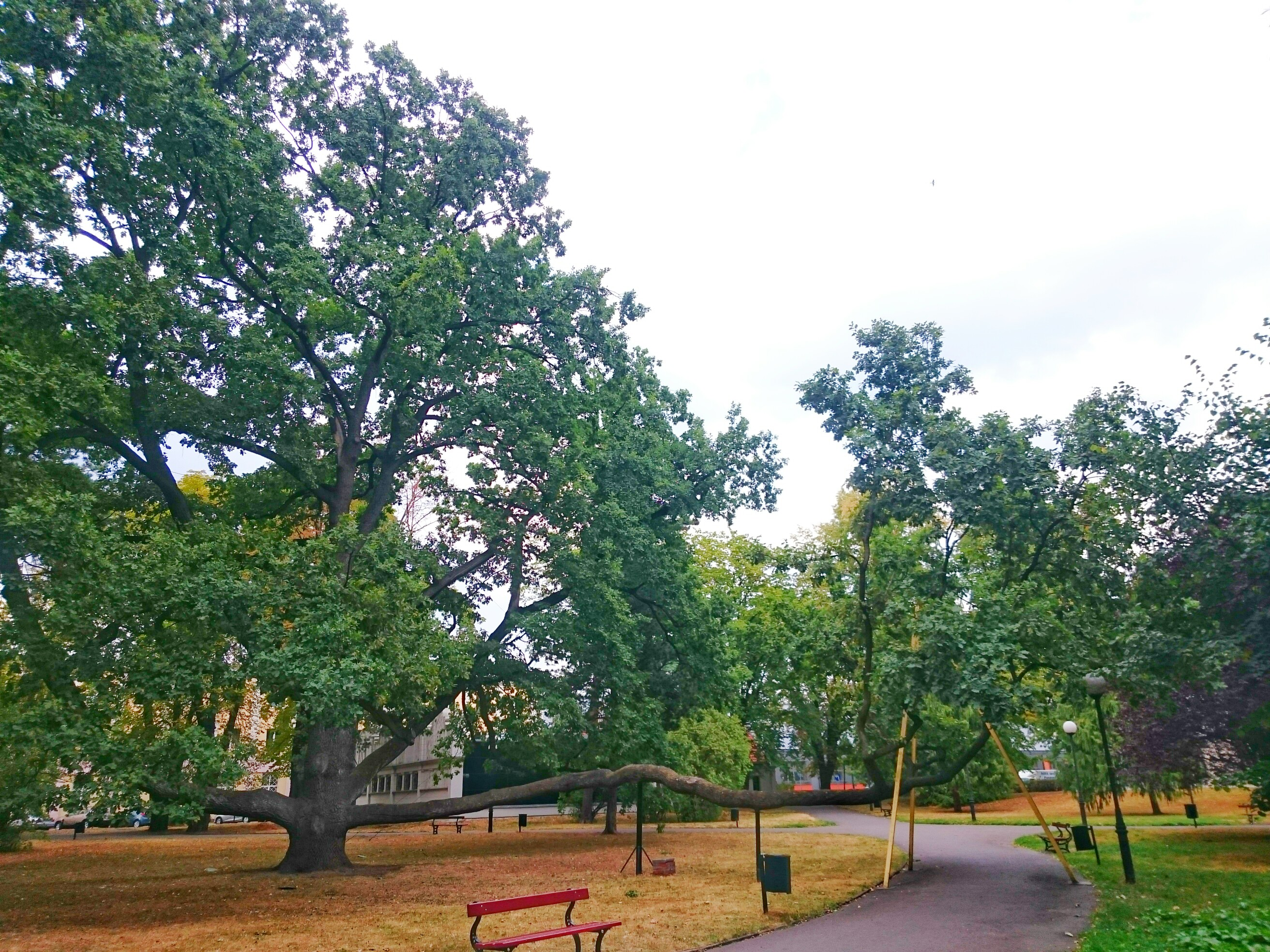
Tree visible from the west

The Fabrykant Oak, also known as Jagosz, is a monumental pedunculate oak located in Michał Klepacz Park in Łódź. It is a characteristic tree of the city of Łódź. Its massive, long branches extend almost perpendicular from the main trunk, spreading horizontally at a height of about 1.5 meters. The oak's girth exceeds 450 cm. The tree is located in the central part of the park, which also contains 23 other monumental trees. The oak has been protected since 1990, with the current legal foundation being the resolution of the Łódź City Council from 2015.

== Characteristics ==
=== Age ===
The oak has not been studied using dendrochronological methods, and its age is estimated to be between 150 and 200 years. Based on archival measurements, the tree is thought to be approximately 165 years old. This is plausible since the Richter family garden, where the tree stands, was established in the second half of the 19th century, and the oak may have been among the first trees planted on the site. However, it is also possible that the Fabrykant Oak is older and grew naturally.

=== Girth ===
In 2015, the tree's girth measured 455 cm. Measuring the girth is challenging due to three large branches diverging from the trunk at a height of about 1–2 meters (approximately 1.5 meters).

Year of measurement	Girth		
Year of measurement	height of measurement		
Year of measurement	0.5 m	0.8 m	unknown
1961	–	–	330 cm
1989	–	–	425 cm
2005	–	452 cm	–
2009	–	–	460 cm
2013	445 cm	–	–
2014	450 cm	–	450 cm
2015	455 cm	–	–

=== Height and other dimensions ===
The Fabrykant Oak reaches a height of between 22 and 22.5 meters. Its crown spans over 30 meters (approximately 33 meters), and its longest branch, supported by additional structures, exceeds 20 meters in length. The branch, along with two others, diverges from the trunk at a height of about 1.5 meters. This growth pattern indicates that the tree has always grown in an open space without pruning, allowing it to develop its distinctive shape.

== History ==
=== Park ===
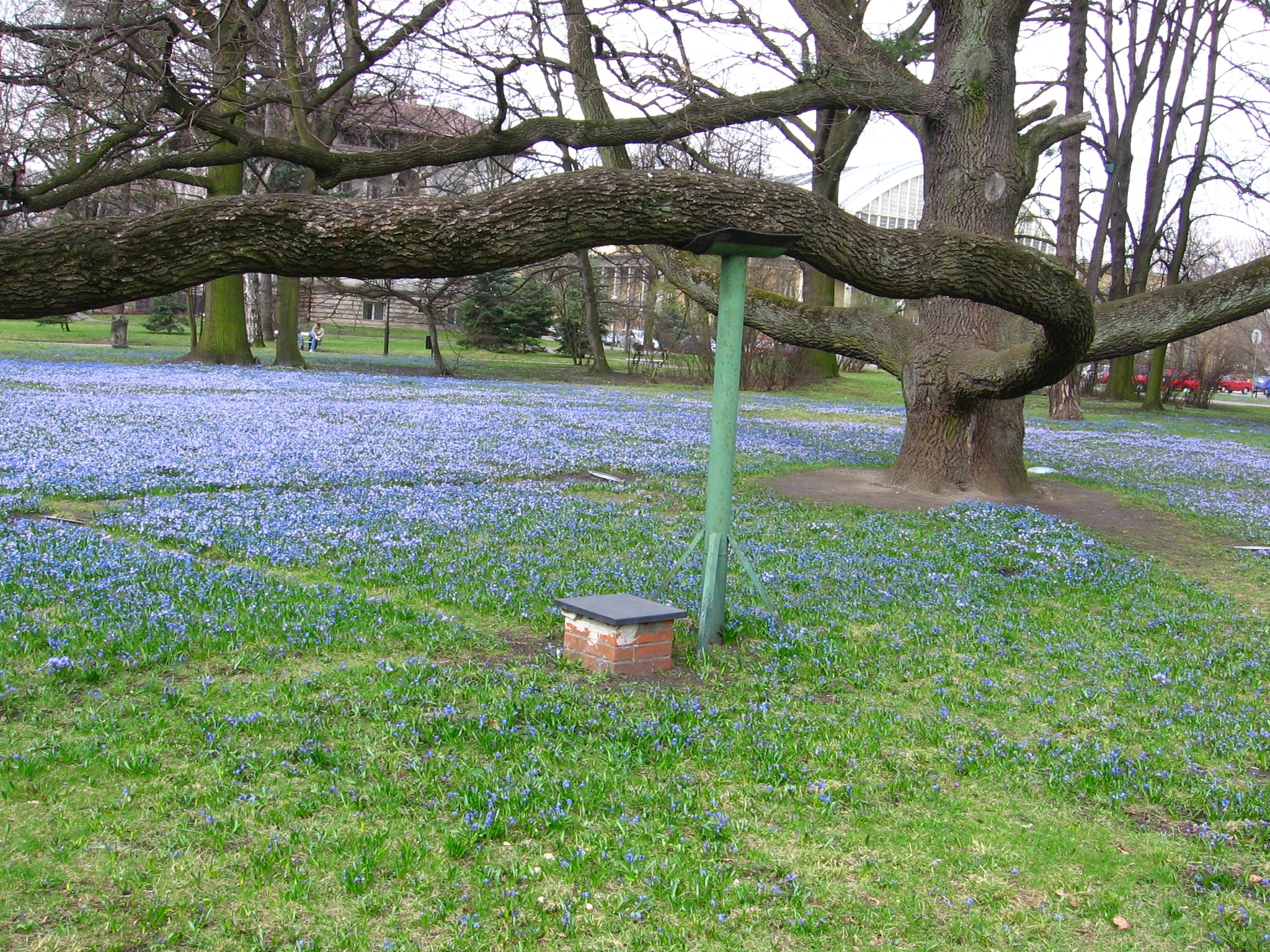
Siberian squills under the longest branch of the Fabrykant Oak

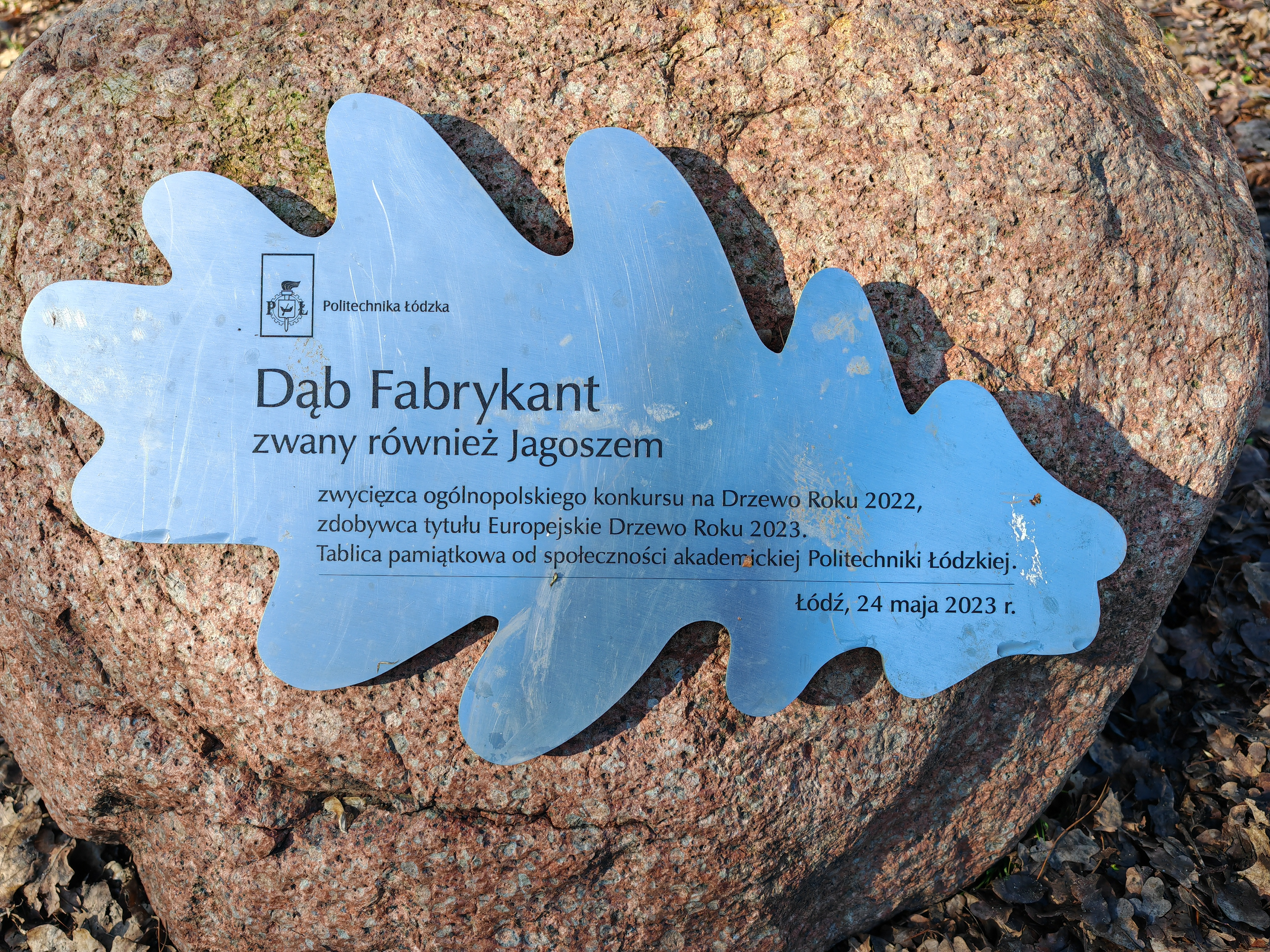
Plaque commemorating the tree's competition wins

In the late 19th century, the lands now forming the park were acquired by the industrialist Richter family, who built two villas and established ornamental gardens around them. Some of the existing trees were preserved, including the Fabrykant Oak. The tree stands at the center of this park, which bore the name of Stanisław Worcell until 1994.

=== Events ===
During World War II, the tree faced the threat of destruction. Allegedly, officials from the Ministry of Public Security intended to uncover a treasure believed to be buried under the oak by the Richter family, but ultimately, this plan was not carried out.

On 15 June 2007, the entire park was handed over for use by the Łódź University of Technology. This was achieved after two years of efforts. It was assured that the area would be fenced, locked at night, and would remain accessible to the public. Since then, the university sought to obtain full ownership of the park from the city. In 2017, the park was officially transferred to the university through a notarized deed. In 2019, the university fenced off the park and simultaneously dismantled the barrier between the park and its Campus B.

The Fabrykant Oak was named Tree of the Year 2022 in a national competition organized by the Ecological and Cultural Association Klub Gaja. In 2023, it won the European Tree of the Year contest.

=== Oak in literature ===
The Fabrykant Oak was first mentioned as a "giant oak" in the 1962 publication Parki Łodzi by Jakub Mowszowicz, a professor of biology at the University of Łódź. A photograph of the oak and its circumference of 330 cm were presented.

The Fabrykant Oak was also described in two albums on notable trees. In Pomniki przyrody województwa łódzkiego (2010), authored by Ireneusz Burzyński, Grażyna Ojrzyńska, and Piotr Wypych, three photographs of the oak are shown along with a circumference measurement of 460 cm. The oak was also included in the 2014 album Drzewa Polski by Krzysztof Borkowski, which features a photograph and another measurement of the oak's circumference – 445 cm.

The tree has been frequently mentioned in local press, including Gazeta Wyborcza, Express Ilustrowany, Ziemia Łódzka, and Dziennik Łódzki. The latter devoted an entire article to the oak in the 25 April 1996 edition. Jan Teofil Siciński, a biology professor at the University of Łódź and the author of the text, described the Fabrykant Oak as follows:

(...) Since the oak is considered the king of plants, Fabrykant can be regarded as the king of Łódź oaks. Its robust size, unique shape, the arrangement of its branches, and excellent condition confirm this title.

=== Origin of the tree's names ===
The name "Fabrykant" was proposed by biologist Professor Jan Siciński from the Faculty of Biology and Environmental Protection at the University of Łódź. It was first used in the aforementioned article in Dziennik Łódzki in 1996. The name refers to the industrial history of the city, as the park where the oak grows was once surrounded by the factories (fabryki) of the Richter family.

The oak is also referred to as Jagosz, in honor of Mieczysław Jagoszewski. He was a long-time journalist for Express Ilustrowany and Dziennik Łódzki, whose editorial offices are located near the park. Jagoszewski was also a co-founder of the Society of Friends of Łódź and the initiator of the reconstruction of the Tadeusz Kościuszko monument, which had been destroyed by the Nazis on Freedom Square.

== Legal protection and conservation measures ==
The oak has been a natural monument since 1990, according to the decree issued by the President of Łódź at that time. In subsequent resolutions by the City Council of Łódź from 2010 and 2013, Fabrykant was included in the list of natural monuments, with the most recent one dating back to 2015.

Conservation work was carried out in 1997 and 2000. The longest branch is supported structurally. Lighting was also installed around the oak to illuminate the tree after dusk.

In December 2013, the oak was damaged by Hurricane Ksawery. One of the branches broke off, and firefighters had to intervene.

== Location and surroundings ==
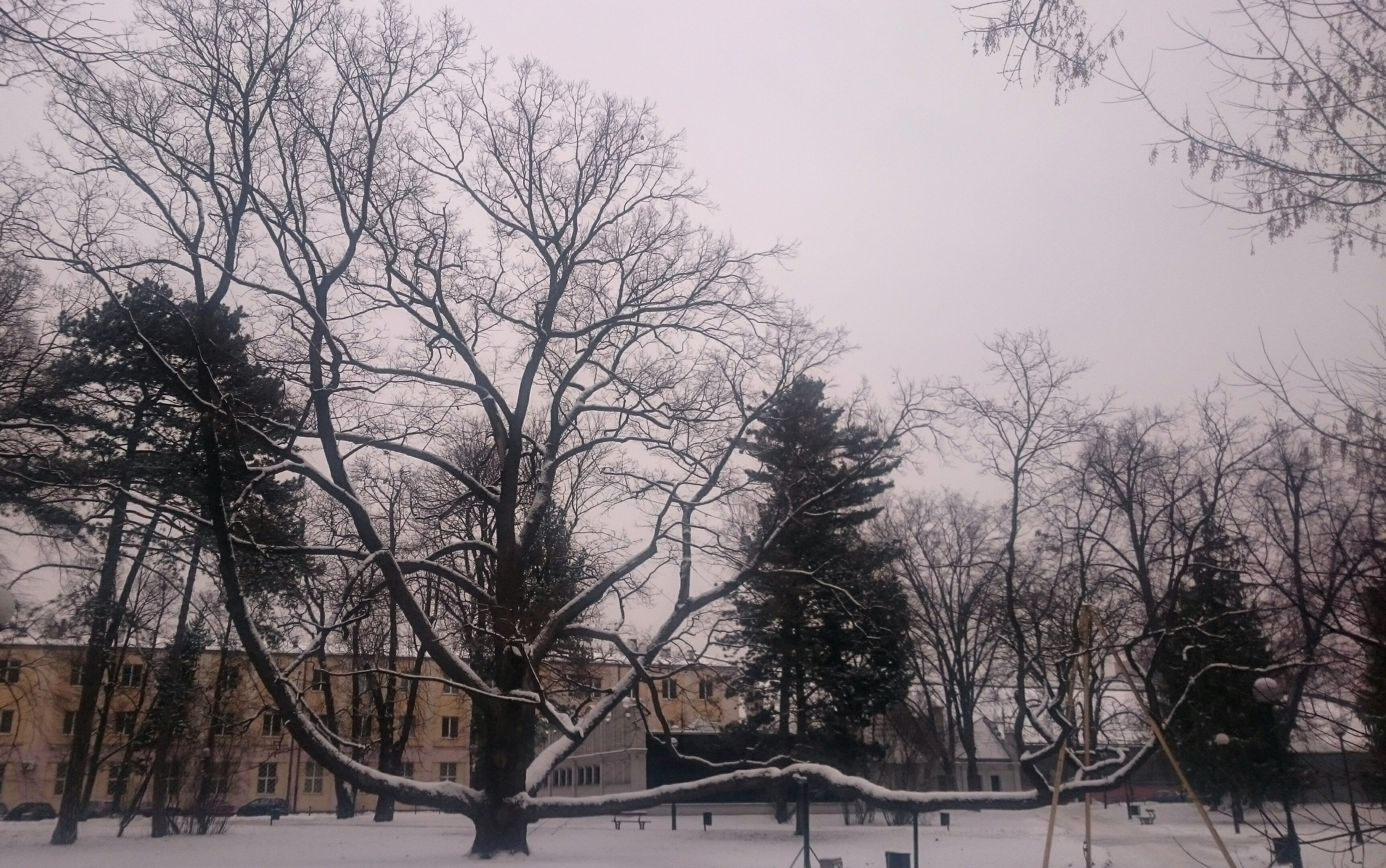
Fabrykant Oak in winter, with Austrian pine and Swiss pine in the background

The oak is located in the center of Łódź, in the Michał Klepacz Park, at the border of the Polesie and Śródmieście districts. The tree, growing along the main avenue between the two former factory owner villas of Reinhold and Józef Richter, is surrounded in early spring by a patch of Siberian squill.

To the west and north of the oak, there are several other monumental oaks, horse chestnut trees, and an Austrian pine. To the east of Fabrykant, one can find a Swiss pine as well as two Nootka cypress trees.

== See also ==
- List of individual trees

== Bibliography ==
- Olaczek, Romuald, ed. (2014). Park imienia ks. bp. Michała Klepacza [Michał Klepacz Park] (in Polish). Łódź: Film-Przyroda-Kultura. ISBN 978-83-92403-15-9.
