= Górak =

Górak is a Polish surname. Notable people with the surname include:

- Andrzej Górak (born 1951), Polish engineer
- Daniel Górak (born 1983), Polish table tennis player
- Stanisław Górak (born 1959), Polish athlete

== See also ==
- Gorak (disambiguation)
