= Gorak =

Gorak may refer to:

- Górak, a surname
- Gorak, Iran (disambiguation), any one of several places with the same name

== People with the surname ==
- Chris Gorak, American film director

== See also ==
- Garak (disambiguation)
