= Jan Anuszczyk =

Polish scientist and professor (born 1948)

- Born: 1948 (age 77–78); Kraszew, Poland
- Citizenship: Poland
- Education: Lodz University of Technology
- Scientific career
- Fields: chemistry
- Workplaces: Lodz University of Technology

Jan Anuszczyk (born 1948 in Kraszew) is a Polish scientist and professor working in the technical disciplines of electrical engineering and power engineering and transport. He has been head of the Transport and Energy Conversion Department at the Institute of Electrical Power Engineering at Lodz University of Technology since 2007.

== Career ==
He originates from the Institute of Electrical Machines and Transformers of Lodz University of Technology (now the Institute of Mechatronics and Information Systems). He is an expert in the fields of properties of ferromagnetic materials and magnetic circuits, electrical machinery (including wind generators), drive means of transport, and modeling and simulation of field phenomena in power systems and transportation.

He is the author of over 150 scientific publications and of 20 projects and unpublished studies on the above topics. He has supervised four doctoral students in technical sciences. He is an associate member of the Section of Electrical Traction at the Committee of Electrical Engineering of the Polish Academy of Sciences.

== Lodz University ==
He has been working for Lodz University of Technology since 1974, being employed in the following positions: 1974-1982 Senior Assistant, Assistant Professor 1982–1992, 1992-1995 Assistant Professor with the degree of Dr. assistant professor, 1995 associate professor. In 2011 he was awarded the title of professor.

== Professional activity ==
In his professional activity he served as Deputy Dean of the Faculty of Electrical and Electronic Engineering in Lodz University of Technology (1996–2002) and director of the Educational Centre of TUL in Bełchatów (2002–2009). He was a member of the Council of Technology and Industrial Park in Bełchatów (2002–2008) and in 2002-2004 a member of the group of experts and the secretary of the assessment team of the Accreditation Commission of Technical Universities (KAUT) in the field of Electrical Engineering. As part of his scientific-organizational activity in Lodz University of Technology he was the coordinator of the interdepartmental Committee for the Multiannual Programme Project "Railways to the Twenty-First Century" and for the Centre for Rail Transport CTS CETRANS.

He is a member of the Polish Society of Theoretical and Applied Electrical Engineering, the Polish Society of Applied Electromagnetics and Lodz Scientific Society.

== Bibliography ==
- Ewa Chojnacka; Zbigniew Piotrowski; Ryszard Przybylski (2006). Profesorowie Politechniki Łódzkiej 1945–2005 (in Polish). Łódź: Wydawnictwo Politechniki Łódzkiej. p. 11.
