= Mieczysław Serwiński =

Prof. Mieczysław Serwiński MP

Personal details
- Born: April 28, 1918 Zakrzew, Poland
- Died: July 30, 1999
- Party: independent
- Education: Lodz University of Technology
- Profession: chemist

Mieczysław Serwiński (28 April 1918 in Zakrzew – 30 July 1999), is a Polish politician, a member of parliament of the 6th, 8th and 9th term in the Polish People's Republic, an honoris causa doctor at the Lodz University of Technology, a chairman of the National Council of the City of Łodź.

== Biography ==
He was awarded a professor’s degree in chemistry. He worked at the Lodz University of Technology. In the period of 1952-1956 he was the Dean of the Faculty of Biotechnology and Food Sciences. From 1962 to 1968 he was an Associate Rector and from 1968 to 1975 he held the position of Rector.

In 1972 he became a deputy of the 6th term of the Sejm (the lower chamber of the Polish Parliament).

He ran for elections in the Łódź Bałuty constituency and did not belong to any political party. He was a member of the Committee of Mining, Energy and Chemistry and the Committee of Science and Technical Progress. In 1980 and 1985 he was re-elected an MP. In the 8th term he ran for elections in the Łódź Śródmieście constituency, and in the 9th term in the Łódź Bałuty constituency. In the 8th term of the Sejm he was a member of the Committee of Mining, Energy and Chemistry, the Committee of Science and Technical Progress, the Extraordinary Committee on reviewing the National Councils and Local Government Bill, the Extraordinary Committee on reviewing the Constitution Bill in respect of extension of the Sejm term of office and the Committee on Education, Science and Technical Progress while in the 9th term he was on the Committee on Building, Spatial Planning, Municipal and Social Housing, the Committee on Science and Technical Progress, the Extraordinary Committee on reviewing bills changing regulations connected with national councils and local government as well as the Extraordinary Committee on reviewing municipal property bills. As a representative of the government and the coalition parties he co-chaired the Committee on the housing policy during the debates of the Polish Round Table.

In the 80s he presided over the works of the National Council of the City of Łódź. On 10 November 1995 he was conferred the title of honoris causa doctor of the Lodz University of Technology.

== Honours ==
- Order of the Banner of Labour, 1st Class
- Order of the Banner of Labour, 2nd Class
- Officer’s Cross of the Order of Polonia Restituta
- Knight’s Cross of the Order of Polonia Restituta
- Gold Cross of Merit
- The Medal of the 10th Anniversary of Polish People’s Republic
- Polish State Millennium Badge
- Badge of Honour of the City of Lodz

He was buried at the Bródno Cemetery in Warsaw.

== Bibliography ==
- Sejm website of the MP of 9th term of office
- Ewa Chojnacka, Zbigniew Piotrowski, Ryszard Przybylski (editors): Profesorowie Politechniki Łódzkiej 1945–2005. Łódź: The Technical University Press, 2006, p. 227.
