= Jan Eugeniusz Krysiński =

Polish scientist (1935–2025)

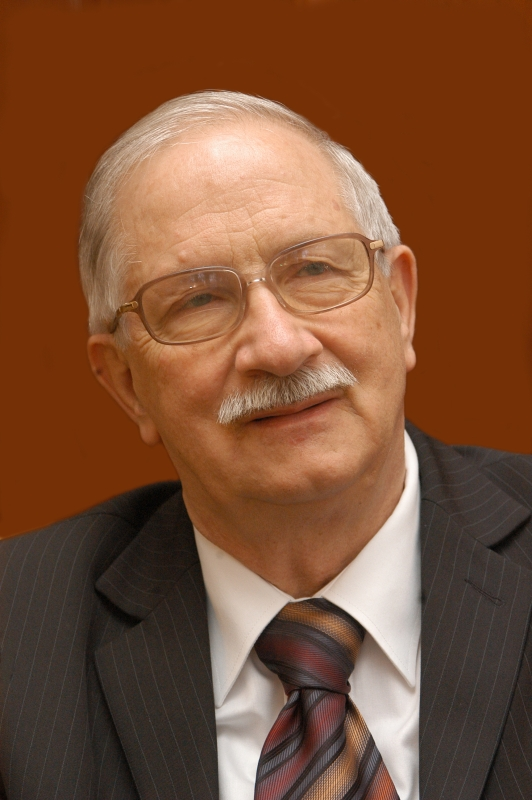

Jan Eugeniusz Krysiński (29 August 1935 – 19 February 2025) was a Polish scientist, specialising in fluid mechanics and turbomachinery research, and rector of Łódź University of Technology.

Krysiński was a graduate of General Secondary School number three under the patronage of Tadeusz Kosciuszko in Lodz. In 1957 he completed his studies at the Technical University of Lodz, where he then started his scientific work. Since that time, he has remained employed at the university. He defended his PhD dissertation in 1965 and habilitation in 1975. In 1980 he was awarded the title of a professor in technical sciences. Since 1991 he held the position of a full professor. Between 1987–1990 he was the Dean of the Faculty of Mechanical Engineering. He was elected Rector of TUL four times in the years 1990-1993-1996 and 2002-2005-2008.

He specialised in research on turbines, gas bearings and renewable energy. He has published more than 80 scientific papers. In 2009, in the elections to the European Parliament he unsuccessfully ran for the deputy mandate from the list of the Civic Platform in the district of Lodz.

Krysiński died on 19 February 2025, at the age of 89.

== Honours and awards ==
Krysiński was awarded, among others, the Knight's Cross (1980), the Commander’s Cross (1995) and the Commander’s with Star Cross (2005), the Order of Polonia Restituta, the French Knight's Orders of Academic Palms and the Legion of Honour (1995 and 2005). He was honored with the titles of doctor honoris causa by the University of Strathclyde in Glasgow (1992), the Polytechnic University of Saint Petersburg (2003), the Jean Moulin University Lyon 3 (2004), the University of Coventry (2005) and the University of Technology in Bielsko-Biala (2005).

== Selected publications ==
- Jan Krysiński (co-author), Low-power Gas Turbines, Ed. Scientific and Technical, 1963.
- Jan Krysiński (co-author), Handbook of Mechanical Engineer Ed. Scientific and Technical, 1969 (two chapters).
- Jan Krysiński (co-author), Gas Bearings and Microturbine Drive, Ed. Scientific and Technical, 1981.
- Jan Krysiński, Turbomachines – théorie générale. Of . des Publications Universitaires, Algiers in 1986 and 1995.

== Bibliography ==
- Ewa Chojnacka; Zbigniew Piotrowski; Ryszard Przybylski (2006). Profesorowie Politechniki Łódzkiej 1945–2005 (in Polish). Łódź: Wydawnictwo Politechniki Łódzkiej. p. 132.
- "Z prac Senatu" (in Polish). Politechnika Śląska. April 2005. Archived from the original on 2 April 2015.
- "Profesor dr hab. inżynier Jan Krysiński" (in Polish). uml.lodz.pl. September 2013.
