= Tomasz Kubiak (Polish mechanical engineer) =

Polish engineer

- Occupation: Academic Teacher
- Title: Professor, D.Sc., Eng. (Technical Sciences)

Academic background
- Education: PhD 1998 – Technical Sciences, Łódź University of Technology Habilitation 2008 – Mechanics, Łódź University of Technology Professorship 2014

Academic work
- Discipline: Mechanics
- Institutions: Łódź University of Technology

Tomasz Kubiak is a Polish mechanical engineer, academic teacher, and professor of technical sciences. He is affiliated with Łódź University of Technology, where he serves as the Head of the Department of Strength of Materials at the Faculty of Mechanical Engineering. His areas of expertise include materials mechanics, stability of thin-walled structures, and the analysis of composite structures. Since 2024, he has served as Chair of the Advisory Team for Research Infrastructure appointed by the Minister of Science.

== Biography ==
In 1992, he graduated from the Faculty of Mechanical Engineering at Łódź University of Technology with a degree in Mechanical Engineering and Machine Design (specialization: Applied Mechanics). In the same year, he joined his alma mater as an assistant at the Department of Strength of Materials and Structures. In 1998, he obtained a PhD in Technical Sciences in the discipline of Mechanics, and in 2008, he earned his habilitation degree in the same field.

In 2011, he was appointed Associate Professor at Łódź University of Technology. By a decision of the President of the Republic of Poland dated 19 December 2014, he was awarded the title of Professor of Technical Sciences.

From 2008 to 2012, he served as Vice-Dean for Student Affairs at the Faculty of Mechanical Engineering of Łódź University of Technology, and from 2012 to 2016 as Vice-Dean for Education and Accreditation. Between 2016 and 2024, he held the position of Dean of the Faculty of Mechanical Engineering. Since 2015, he has been Head of the Department of Strength of Materials.

Between 2019 and 2024, he served as Chair of the Scientific Discipline Council for Mechanical Engineering, and from 2020 to 2024 as Chair of the Council of Deans of Mechanical Engineering Faculties at Polish Technical Universities. In 2024, he was appointed by the Minister of Science as Chair of the Advisory Team for Research Infrastructure for the 2024–2028 term.

== Scientific activity ==
His research focuses on the nonlinear stability of thin-walled structures subjected to static and dynamic loading. In his scientific work, he applies concepts from materials mechanics and elasticity theory, including the theory of isotropic and orthotropic thin plates as well as composite laminates. His research addresses structural stability, post-buckling behaviour, and load-carrying capacity. He employs both analytical and numerical methods, particularly the finite element method. He also conducts experimental studies on thin-walled structures made of GFRP and CFRP composite laminates.

Tomasz Kubiak is listed in the World's Top 2% Scientists ranking, developed by Stanford University and Elsevier, which recognizes researchers with the highest global citation impact.

He is the author or co-author of more than 150 scientific publications and monographs on the stability of thin-walled structures, including the Springer book Static and Dynamic Buckling of Thin-Walled Plate Structures. He has published in leading journals in the fields of structural and materials mechanics, including Thin-Walled Structures, Composite Structures, and International Journal of Mechanical Sciences.

He has led research projects funded by the National Science Centre (NCN), including four projects carried out under the OPUS funding scheme. He has also participated in projects financed through the Innovative Economy Operational Programme. Furthermore, he has collaborated with international research institutions, including the University of Calabria, the German Aerospace Center (DLR), and the University of Bath.

He is a member of the Committee on Mechanics of the Polish Academy of Sciences. He is involved in international scientific cooperation in structural mechanics and has served as an expert and member of bodies responsible for the evaluation and development of research in the field of mechanics.
