= Józef Mayer =

Polish chemist

- Born: 21 May 1939; Łódź, Poland
- Died: 19 November 2016 (aged 77)
- Citizenship: Poland
- Education: Lodz University of Technology
- Awards: Knight's Cross of the Order of Polonia Restituta; Gold Cross of Merit
- Scientific career
- Fields: Radiation chemistry
- Workplaces: Lodz University of Technology

Józef Mayer (21 May 1939 – 19 November 2016) was a Polish chemist, specializing in radiation chemistry, the Rector of Lodz University of Technology in 1996–2002.

Józef Mayer graduated from the Faculty of Chemistry of Lodz University of Technology (TUL), in 1961. In the same year he started work in the Department of Physical Chemistry. Józef Mayer presented his PhD thesis in 1968. In 1988 he became Associate Professor and in 1994 he received the title of Professor of TUL.

Mayer's research was focused on radiation chemistry and involved work on the matter of excited state and ion recombination admixtures in liquid hydrocarbons. He also did research on the process of reactivity transmission in solid polymers by means of impulse methods.

He wrote 110 articles and presented 120 reports and papers at conferences in Poland and abroad. He promoted four doctors. He was a member of "Journal of Radioanalytical and Nuclear Chemistry" editorial committee, the Polish Chemical Society, the president of Polish Radiation Society in years 1989–1995. Józef Mayer was also a member of Miller Trust for Radiation, the Science Committee of Nuclear Institute in Warsaw, the Science Committee in Polish Academy of Sciences of Polymer Chemistry in Zabrze and the State Committee for Atomics, and also a member of the Department Committee of Polish Academy of Sciences in Łódź.

In years 1994-2007 Józef Mayer held the post of president of the Institute of Applied Radiation Chemistry of TUL. In years 1987-1990 he was Associate Dean and in 1990-1993 he was the Dean of the Faculty of Chemistry of TUL. Józef Mayer held a position of students' affairs dean in 1993–1996. He was the Rector of TUL in 1996–2002. He retired in 2008 and died on 19 November 2016.

== Awards and badges of merit ==
- Gold Cross of Merit (1983)
- Knight's Cross of the Order of Polonia Restituta (2002)
- National Education Committee Medal (1996)
- Prime Minister Laurels (2001)
- Honorary Badge of Łódź (1990)
- Honorary Badge of Łódź Voivodeship (2002)
- Badge in merit to TUL (1987)
- Honorary Badge in Merit to Bielskie Voivodeship (1997)
- Badge in Merit to Akademia Techniczno-Humanistyczna in Bielsko- Biała (2004)
- Medal of M. Sklodowska-Curie Polish Radiation Society for scientific research (1989)

== Bibliography ==
- Ewa Chojnacka; Zbigniew Piotrowski; Ryszard Przybylski (2006). Profesorowie Politechniki Łódzkiej 1945–2005 (in Polish). Łódź: Wydawnictwo Politechniki Łódzkiej. p. 165.
- Stefan Karolczak; Jan Perkowski (2013). "Zeszyty Historyczne Politechniki Łódzkiej: 50 lat chemii radiacyjnej w Politechnice Łódzkiej (zeszyt 14)". Zeszyty Historyczne Politechniki Łódzkiej (in Polish). Łódź: Wydawnictwo Politechniki Łódzkiej: 28. ISSN 1731-6553.
- "Prof. dr hab. inż. Józef Mayer" (in Polish). Archived from the original on 14 July 2014.
