= Kraszew, Brzeziny County =

Kraszew
- Village
- Location within Poland
- Coordinates: 51°53′44″N 19°49′21″E
- Country: Poland
- Voivodeship: Łódź
- County: Brzeziny
- Gmina: Dmosin

Kraszew [ˈkraʂɛf] is a village in the administrative district of Gmina Dmosin, within Brzeziny County, Łódź Voivodeship, in central Poland.

== Notable people ==
- Jan Anuszczyk (born 1948), scientist and professor
