= Henryk Bem =

Polish chemist

- Born: 1940; Łódź, Poland
- Died: 21 August 2025 (aged 84–85)
- Citizenship: Poland
- Education: Lodz University of Technology
- Scientific career
- Fields: chemistry
- Workplaces: Lodz University of Technology

Henryk Bem (Polish pronunciation: [ˈxɛn.rɨk bɛm]; 1940–21 August 2025) was a Polish chemist and professor at Lodz University of Technology.

In 1962 he graduated from Lodz University of Technology, Faculty of Chemistry, where in 1979 he obtained a Ph.D. degree in chemistry. Since then, he worked in the Department of Physical Chemistry until 1987. After the reorganization, he worked in the Institute of Applied Radiation Chemistry. In the years 1979-1984, he completed an internship and then worked as a research associate at Dalhousie University in Canada. In 1987 he obtained a postdoctoral degree. From 1989 to 1995, he stayed in Kuwait in the Ministry of Health as a consultant for radiological protection. In 1997 he held a position as an associate professor in the Institute of Applied Radiation Chemistry and in 2003 was awarded the title of Professor of Chemical Sciences.

His scientific interests concentrated on new methods for the quantitative determination of radionuclides in environmental samples, as well as the impact of technical activities on natural radioactive decay levels and the additional degree of radiation hazard.

He was the author of over 80 scientific papers and three monographs and was a fivefold doctoral advisor. From 1999 to 2005, he was the deputy dean for education, and in the years 2005-2008, the dean of the Faculty of Chemistry at Lodz University of Technology.

== Bibliography ==
- Ewa Chojnacka; Zbigniew Piotrowski; Ryszard Przybylski (2006). Profesorowie Politechniki Łódzkiej 1945–2005 (in Polish). Łódź: Wydawnictwo Politechniki Łódzkiej. p. 20.
