= Bolesław Konorski =

- Born: 14 April 1892; Łódź, Poland
- Died: 20 October 1984 (aged 92); Łódź, Poland
- Citizenship: Poland
- Education: University of Vienna
- Scientific career
- Fields: Electrotechnics
- Workplaces: Lodz University of Technology

Bolesław Konorski (14 April 1892 – 12 February 1986) was a Polish engineer and electrotechnician. He was Rector of the Lodz University of Technology in 1952–1953.

He graduated from the Vienna University of Technology in 1918. In 1946 he started work at the Lodz University of Technology (TUL), where he largely contributed to the organising of the didactic process for electricians. He was a founder and then Head of the Fundamentals of Electrotechnology Department. From 1948 to 1952 he was Pro-Rector of the TUL, then Rector in 1952–1953. He became a full professor in 1951.

Konorski published nearly 100 works in the field of theoretical electrotechnology, in which he made a generalisation of Coulomb's law and specified and expanded the concept of molecular capacity in power cables. His four-volume monograph on the fundamentals of electrotechnology and theoretical electrotechnology was the first academic course-book in the field in post-war Poland. He also published a book on the elements of relativity theory and relativistic mechanics and electrodynamics. He was an author and editor of Kalendarzyk Elektrotechniczny.

Konorski was a co-founder of the Polish Association of Theoretical and Applied Electrotechnology, a member of the Polish Academy of Sciences' Science Council in the Institute of Basic Problems in Technology, and a member of the Lodz Scientific Association.

From 1952 to 1957 he was a member of the Central Membership Committee. In 1979 he became a member of Scientific Training Association (Towarzystwo Kursów Naukowych).

== Bibliography ==
- Ewa Chojnacka; Zbigniew Piotrowski; Ryszard Przybylski (2006). Profesorowie Politechniki Łódzkiej 1945–2005 (in Polish). Łódź: Wydawnictwo Politechniki Łódzkiej. p. 112.
- Kto jest kim w Polsce 1984 (in Polish). Warszawa: Wydawnictwo Interpress. pp. 420–421. ISBN 8322320736.
