= Reinhold Richter Villa =

Coordinates: 51.7486°N 19.4553°E

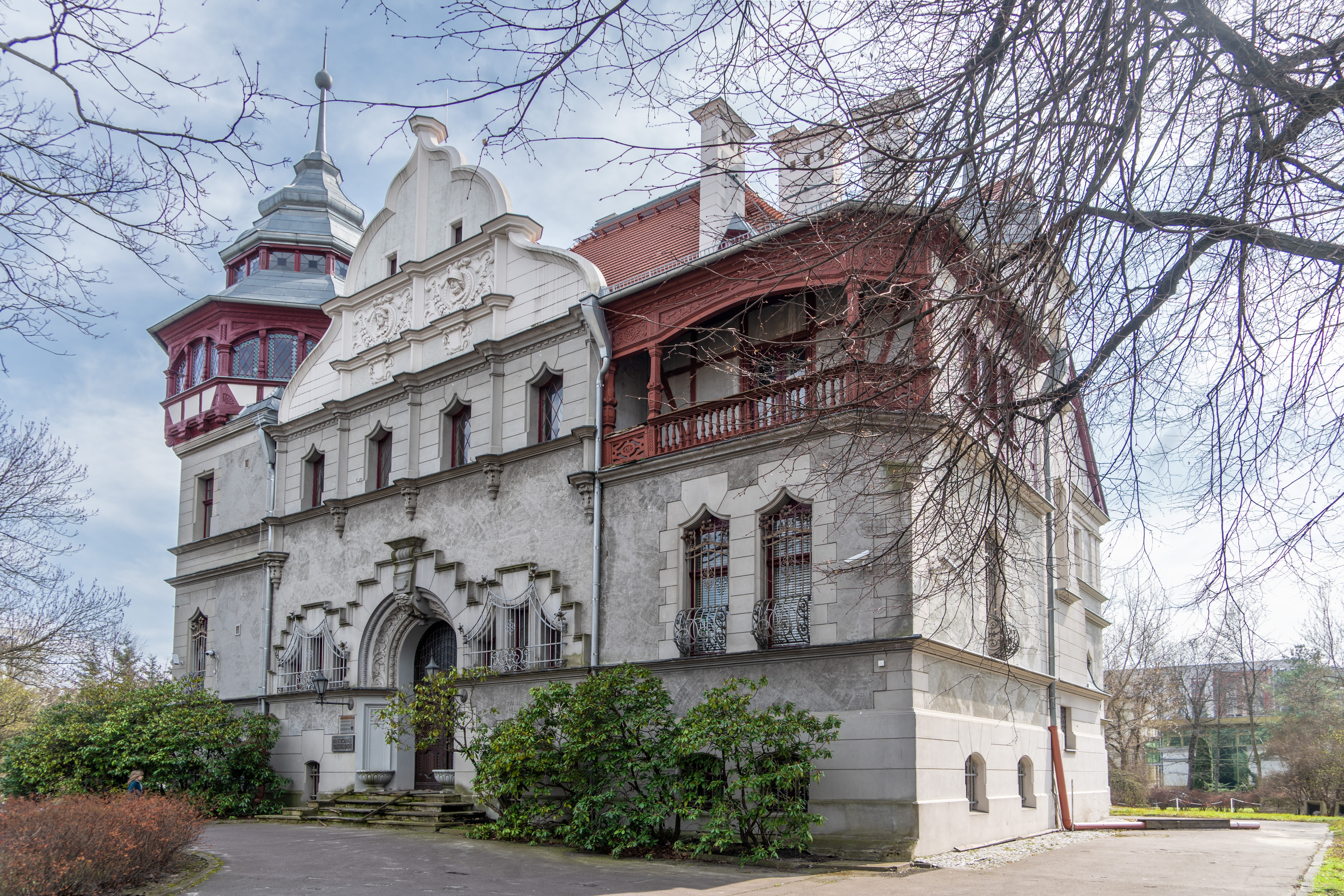
Reinhold Richter Villa

Reinhold Richter Villa at Skorupki Street 6/8 in Łódź, Poland in a park named after the bishop Michał Klepacz is now the main office of the Rector of Lodz University of Technology (TUL).

The villa was built by an architect Ignatius Stebelski in the years 1903–1904 at then Placowa Street. The building was designed according to German and English examples of "irregular architecture" for Reinhold Richter. His brother, Joseph Richter, had built his villa in the vicinity a few years earlier, so the park joined both buildings.

After the death of Reinhold Richter in 1930, his wife Matilda, and their five children co-owned the villa. After the death of Matilda there was a further division of the property. Jadwiga Scheibler née Richter was the last inhabitant till the Second World War. After the war, the villa was taken over by the Association of Workers’ Universities. From 1951 to 1956 it housed the Preparatory Centre for Higher Schools. On 23 November 1954 a document transferring the ownership of the building to Lodz University of Technology was drawn up, but the transfer finally took place in the first half of 1956, when it became the seat of the newly created Faculty of Civil Engineering. From 1969 to 1976 the villa housed the Publications Department of TUL. In 1977 it was decided that the building will be used as the Rector’s main office. One year later the repair and maintenance work started which lasted, with a few years break, until April 1985. The official transfer of the building took place on the 40th anniversary of TUL on 24 May 1985.

== Bibliography ==
- "Richter's Villa. The seat of the Rectorate of Lodz University of Technology".
- Edyta Białas. "Willa Reinholda Richtera w Łodzi" (in Polish).
