= Mieczysław Klimek =

- Born: 1913; Pabianice, Poland
- Died: 1995 (aged 81–82); Warsaw
- Citizenship: Poland
- Education: Warsaw University of Technology
- Awards: Commander's Cross with Star of the Order of Polonia Restituta, Officer's Cross of the Order of Polonia Restituta
- Scientific career
- Fields: electrical and thermal devices
- Workplaces: Lodz University of Technology

Mieczysław Klimek (1913 in Pabianice – 1995) was a Polish specialist in electrical and thermal devices in textile applications, a former rector of Lodz University of Technology (TUL).

In 1939, he graduated from Warsaw University of Technology, the Faculty of Electrical Engineering. In 1939–1941, he was a prisoner of Nazi concentration camp. After the liberation in 1945, he joined the textile industry and became the chief engineer at the plant "Krusche and Ender" in Pabianice, and since 1947 the director of the Scientific and Research Institute of Textiles. Then he became a part of the organizing team at the Technical University of Lodz in Poland, the first Textile Faculty. In 1948, he was awarded the title of professor and entrusted the creation and management of the Faculty of Textile Design at TUL, where he worked until his retirement in 1984. Since 1949, he was the director of the Institute of Textiles. In 1954, he received the title of associate professor, and in 1963 the title of professor.

His research interests include issues related to industrial applications. He promoted 6 doctors.

From 1956, he was a member of the Council for Higher Education. In 1952, he was elected rector of the College of Engineering in Lodz which was running part-time courses, in the years 1953–1962 he held the position of rector of the Technical University od Lodz for 3 terms.

He was awarded, among others, the Commander's Cross and the Officer's Cross of the Order of Polonia Restituta.

== Bibliography ==
- Ewa Chojnacka; Zbigniew Piotrowski; Ryszard Przybylski (2006). Profesorowie Politechniki Łódzkiej 1945–2005 (in Polish). Łódź: Wydawnictwo Politechniki Łódzkiej. pp. 107–108.
- Ewa Chojnacka (2013). "Faculty honored Mieczyslaw Klimek". The Life of the University: Technical University of Lodz Newsletter (in Polish). 126. Łódź: Politechnika Łódzka: 15. ISSN 1425-4344.
