= Jerzy Kroh =

Polish chemist

- Born: 28 August 1924; Warsaw, Poland
- Died: 15 February 2016 (aged 91)
- Citizenship: Poland
- Education: Lodz University of Technology
- Awards: Commanders of the Order of Polonia Restituta; Knight's Cross of the Order of Polonia Restituta
- Scientific career
- Fields: Radiation chemistry
- Workplaces: Lodz University of Technology

Jerzy Kroh (28 August 1924 – 15 February 2016) was a Polish chemist, the founder of a radiation chemistry school in Łódź, and the author or co-author of about 400 publications and several books.

From 1981 to 1987, Kroh was rector of the Technical University of Lodz, and from 1962 to 1994 was in charge of the Interministerial Institute of Applied Radiation, of which he was a founder. From 1996 to 1998, Kroh was Vice President of Łódź, responsible for science and education. He received honorary doctorates from the University of Leeds and the University of Strathclyde in the United Kingdom, the University of Pavia in Italy, and the Technical University of Lodz.

Kroh has many other awards as well, including the Knight's Cross of the Order of Polonia Restituta, Knight Commander of the Order of the Rebirth of Poland, and the Imperial Japanese Order of the Silver and Gold Star. He is an honorary member of the Royal Society of Edinburgh HFRS, of the Polish Academy of Sciences, and of the Scientific Society of Lodz. He died on 15 February 2016 at the age of 91.

== Bibliography ==
- Ewa Chojnacka; Zbigniew Piotrowski; Ryszard Przybylski (2006). Profesorowie Politechniki Łódzkiej 1945–2005 (in Polish). Łódź: Wydawnictwo Politechniki Łódzkiej. pp. 127–128.
- Józef Mayer (1994). "Profesor Jerzy Kroh". Sylwetki łódzkich uczonych (Zeszyt 13). Łódzkie Towarzystwo Naukowe. ISSN 1230-4328.
