= Stanisław Bielecki =

Polish chemist

- Born: 9 November 1946 (age 79); Sandomierz, Poland
- Citizenship: Poland
- Education: Lodz University of Technology
- Awards: Officer's Cross of the Order of Polonia Restituta
- Scientific career
- Fields: Biochemistry, biotechnology, enzymology
- Workplaces: Lodz University of Technology

Stanisław Bielecki (Polish pronunciation: [staˈɲiswav bjɛˈlɛt͡skʲi]; born 9 November 1946 in Sandomierz) is a Polish chemist who specialises in technical biochemistry, biotechnology and enzymology, since 2008 he has held the position of the Rector of Lodz University of Technology.

In 1965 Stanisław Bielecki passed his secondary school leaving exams in Technical Secondary School of Fruit and Vegetable Processing. Since the beginning of studies he has been devoted to the Faculty of Food Sciences, and subsequently to the Faculty of Biotechnology and Food Sciences, both at Lodz University of Technology. In 1970 he was awarded the MSc degree and in 1978 he completed his doctoral studies. Having defended the dissertation entitled "Biosynthesis and characteristics of streptomyces sp.1228 lytic complex of 1,3-beta-glucanases and their activity in the yeast zymolysis process" he was awarded the PhD title with 'habilitation' specialising in food sciences in the field of agricultural sciences. In 1999 he was conferred the professor title in the field of technical sciences.

Stanisław Bielecki started his scientific activity in 1970. In 1993 he was conferred the title of associate professor and in 2002 he was awarded the title of full professor in the Institute of Technical Biochemistry. In 1993 Stanisław Bielecki became the associate dean, and between 1996 – 2002 he held the position of dean of the Faculty of Biotechnology and Food Sciences. From 2002 to 2008 he was the Associate Rector responsible for Research and Development. In 2008 he was appointed the Rector for a 4-year term at Lodz University of Technology. 2012 brought him the second term in the same position. Stanisław Bielecki is the author of over 180 publications, 4 patents and over 20 patent applications. He has been awarded by the President of Poland the Order of Polonia Restituta.

== Bibliography ==
- Ewa Chojnacka; Zbigniew Piotrowski; Ryszard Przybylski (2006). Profesorowie Politechniki Łódzkiej 1945–2005 (in Polish). Łódź: Wydawnictwo Politechniki Łódzkiej. pp. 21–22.
