= Andrzej Górak =

Polish process engineer

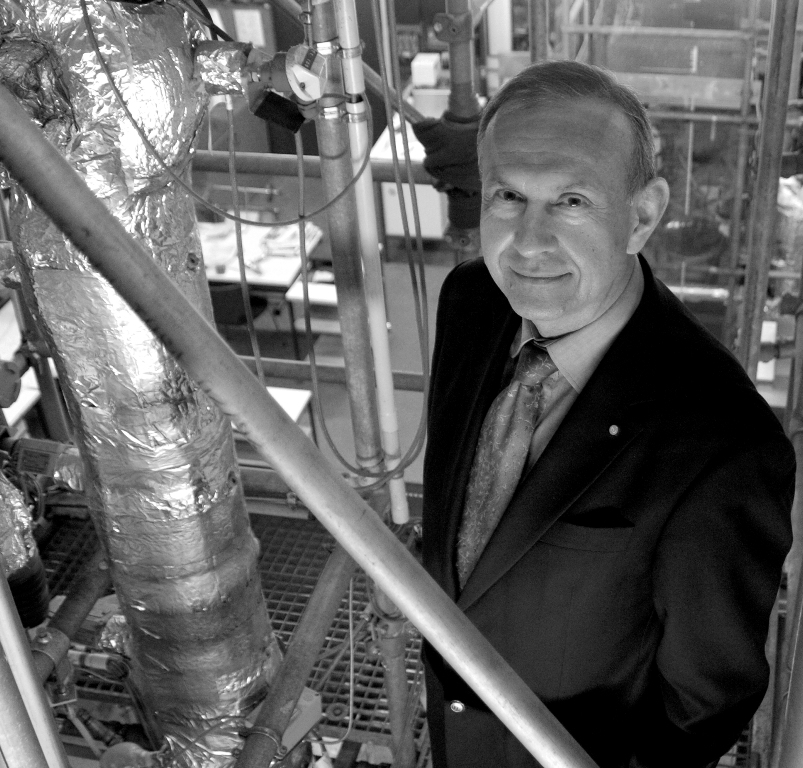
- Picture of Andrzej Górak
- Born: 15 February 1951 (age 75); Andrychów, Poland
- Scientific career
- Fields: Process Engineering

Andrzej Górak (born February 15, 1951, in Andrychów, Poland) is a Polish process engineer and the Head of Laboratory of Fluid Separations at the Department of Biochemical and Chemical Engineering at the TU Dortmund University.

== Career ==
Professor Andrzej Górak studied chemistry at the Technical University of Lodz in Poland. He obtained his Ph.D. from the Faculty of Process Engineering in 1979. His thesis treated continuous distillation of multi-component mixtures. He worked at the same faculty as senior researcher until 1988. The following four years he spent as a researcher at Henkel KGaA in Düsseldorf. Having completed his “habilitation” at RWTH Aachen in 1989 and at Technical University Warsaw in 1990, Andrzej Górak became professor at the chair of fluid separation processes at TU Dortmund University in 1992. In 1996 he took over the chair of fluid separation processes at the University of Essen. Four years later, in 2000, he returned to TU Dortmund University to become the head of Laboratory of Fluid Separations, former chair of fluid separation processes. Apart from this, he has been full professor at the Technical University of Lodz since 2003. Since 2009 he has been decan of the Faculty of Biochemical and Chemical Engineering until the University Council of TU Dortmund University elected him as prorector for research in April 2011. He kept this position until January 2014. Between 2010 and 2012 he was member of Council of National Centre for Research and Development, appointed by Polish minister of science.

The scientific activities of professor Andrzej Górak are focused on the computer aided simulation and experimental validation of integrated reaction and separation processes, like reactive distillation and reactive absorption as well as on the analysis of hybrid separation processes. Professor Górak is an editor of the journal "Chemical Engineering and Processing: Process Intensification“. In 2010 he was awarded the Federal Cross of Merit on ribbon (Verdienstkreuz am Bande) of the Federal Republic of Germany on 29 June 2010 for his contributions to international understanding between Poland and Germany. In 2013 President of Republic Poland awarded him with Order of Merit of the Republic of Poland. In 2014 he was also awarded by DECHEMA and Verein Deutscher Ingenieure with Kirschbaum-Medaille for his outstanding achievements in fluid separations. He is also editor of the series of three books on distillation (2014), which are the most comprehensive review on this technology ever published. In 2018 professor Górak received the North Rhine-Westphalia order of merit in recognition of his social commitment.

== Research Overview ==
Conventional Fluid Separations

- Distillation, absorption and extraction
- Mass and heat transfer in multi-component systems
- Experimental determination of model parameters
- Rigorous modelling and simulation (continuous and batch)

Reactive Separations

- Reactive distillation, absorption and extraction
- Modelling, simulation and experimental investigation
- Process design and -optimization

Membrane Separations

- Pervaporation and vapour permeation
- Nanofiltration and membrane reactors
- Detailed modelling and simulation
- Experimental determination of model parameters

Hybrid Separations

- Combination of conventional fluid separations
- Membrane-assisted separation processes
- Modelling, simulation, optimisation and experimental investigation

Process Intensification

- Using reactive and hybrid separations
- Combining membranes with reactive separations
- Investigation of rotating packed bed separations

Bioseparations

- Application of ionic liquids for bioextraction
- Bioalcohol separation by organophilic membranes
- Optimisation of downstream processing

== Honours and awards ==
- 2018: Order of Merit of North Rhine-Westphalia
- 2016: Member of the German National Academy of Science and Engineering
- 2014: Emil Kirschbaum-Medal
- 2013: "Kavalierskreuz" of the order of merit of the Republic of Poland for his commitment for the German-Polish-Corporation
- 2012: "Second Best project award 2012" for the EU project AIMs (Advanced Interactive Materials by Design)
- 2010: Order of Merit of the Federal Republic of Germany for great service to the international understanding among Poland and Germany
- 1992: "Friedrich-Wilhelm-Award" for the habilitation treatise at the RWTH Aachen
- 1983: Awarded by the scientific secretary of the Polish Academy of Science for technology transfer
- 1979: Award for doctoral thesis
- 1974: Award for the best practice-oriented diploma thesis in Poland

== Book chapters ==
- A. Górak, H. Schoenmakers: Distillation: Operation and applications, Academic Press, 2014
- A. Górak, Z. Olujic: Distillation: Equipment and processes, Academic Press, 2014
- A. Górak, E. Sorensen: Distillation: Fundamentals and principles, Academic Press, 2014
- E.Y. Kenig, A. Górak: Modeling of Reactive Distillation. In: Modeling of Process Intensification. (Ed. F. J. Keil), Wiley-VCH, Weinheim, 2007
- J. Richter, A. Górak: E. Y. Kenig: Reactive distillation. In: Integrated Reaction and Separation Operations. (Eds. H. Schmidt-Traub & A. Górak), Springer, Heidelberg, 2006
- K. Hölemann, A. Górak: Absorption. In: Fluid Verfahrenstechnik. Grundlagen, Methodik, Technik, Praxis. (Ed. R. Goedecke), Willey-VCH, Weinheim, 2006
- E. Y. Kenig, A. Górak: Reactive Absorption. In: Integrated Chemical Processes . (Eds. K. Sundmacher, A. Kienle & A. Seidel-Morgenstern), Willey-VCH, Weinheim, 2005
- E. Y. Kenig, A. Górak, H.-J. Bart: Reactive separations in fluid systems. In: Re-engineering the chemical processing plant. (Eds. A. Stankiewicz & J. Moulijn), Marcel Dekker Inc., New York, 2003
- A. Górak: Simulation thermischer Trennverfahren fluider Vielkomponentengemische. In: Prozeßsimulation. (Ed. H. Schuler), Verlag Chemie, Mannheim, 1995

== Publications and patents ==
Górak has well over 450 publications and patents.

== Selected functions ==
- Since 2010: Regional coordinator, SFB TR63 InPrompt, founded by DFG
- Since 2000: European Federation of Chemical Engineering, Working Party on Distillation, Absorption and Extraction, Process Intensification
- Since 1995: Editor of Chemical Engineering and Processing: Process Intensification
- 2005-2010: ProcessNet, member of executive board
- 2005-2010: ProcessNet, Section Fluid Dynamics and Separation Technology, chairman
- 2002-2008: ProcessNet, Technical Committee on Fluid Process Engineering, chairman
- 1999-2005: DECHEMA, Working Committee on Process Simulation und Synthesis, chairman
