= Garuk, Ravar =

Garuk گروك
- Village
- Location within Iran
- Coordinates: 30°45′45″N 57°03′07″E
- Country: Iran
- Province: Kerman
- County: Ravar
- Bakhsh: Kuhsaran
- Rural District: Heruz

Population (2006)
  - Total: 183
- Time zone: UTC+3:30 (IRST)
  - Summer (DST): UTC+4:30 (IRDT)

Garuk (Persian: گروك, also Romanized as Garūk; also known as Gorūg) is a village in Heruz Rural District, Kuhsaran District, Ravar County, Kerman Province, Iran. At the 2006 census, its population was 183, in 52 families.
