= Joseph Richter Villa =

Coordinates: 51°44′55″N 19°27′11″E

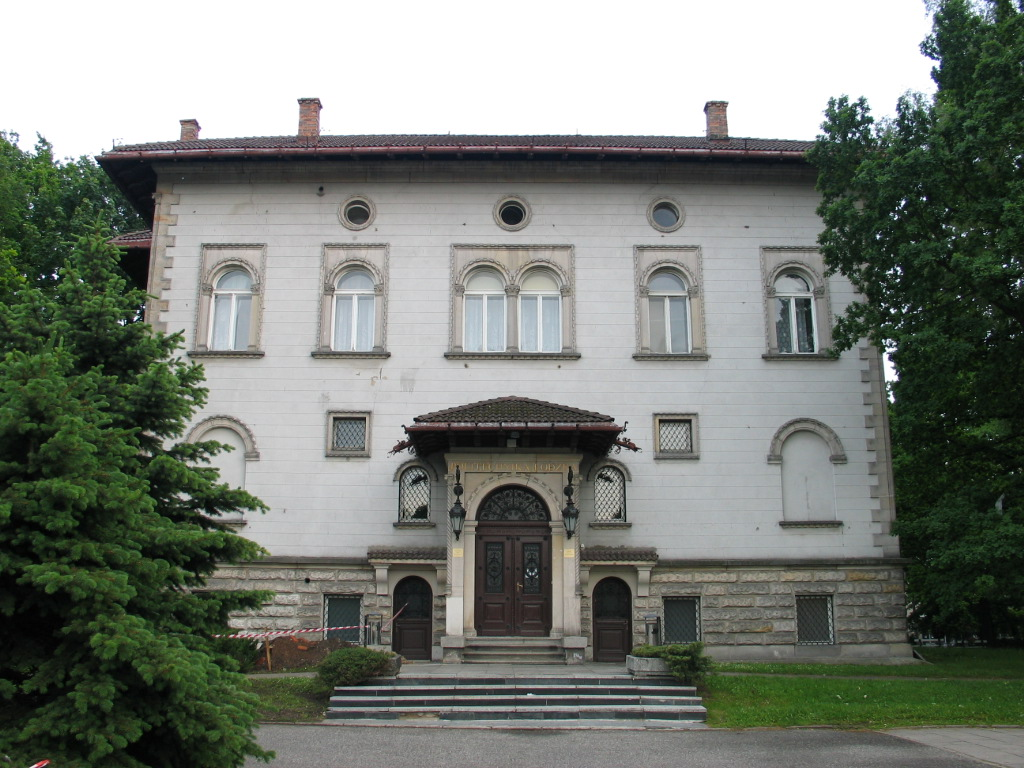
Joseph Richter Villa

The Joseph Richter Villa is in Łódź, Poland at Skorupki Street (formerly Placowa St.) 10/12, in Bishop Michał Klepacz Park. It is a listed historical monument.

Designed by Piotr Brukalski, the villa was constructed for Joseph Richter in 1888–89. The building, following the standards of the Italian Renaissance, has a loggia facing the garden. It was designed as a single family residence. It shared a park with the neighbouring villa of Reinhold Richter.

In 1933, the villa was the residence of Łódź voivode Aleksander Hauke-Nowak. In 1939, Gertrude Paula Ramisch (the last member of the Richter family) sold the villa with the furniture and homeware to Helmut Biedermann. After the Second World War, the building became an orphanage, Thereafter, Lodz University of Technology bought it and kept it a seat of the International Faculty of Engineering until 2007. Since 2009, the building has been the seat for the rector’s administration.
