= Łódź University of Technology =

University of technology in Łódź, Poland

- Politechnika Łódzka
- Latin: Scientiarum Technicarum Schola Lodziensis
- Former name: Technical University of Lodz
- Type: Public
- Established: 1945
- Affiliations: Campus Europae, ECIU, Erasmus, Leonardo da Vinci, SEFI
- Rector: Krzysztof Jóźwik
- Students: 10,284 (12.2023)
- Location: Żeromskiego 116, 90-924, Łódź, Poland; 51°45′11″N 19°27′00″E
- Website: www.p.lodz.pl/en

University rankings

Regional – Overall
- QS Emerging Europe and Central Asia: 93 (2022)

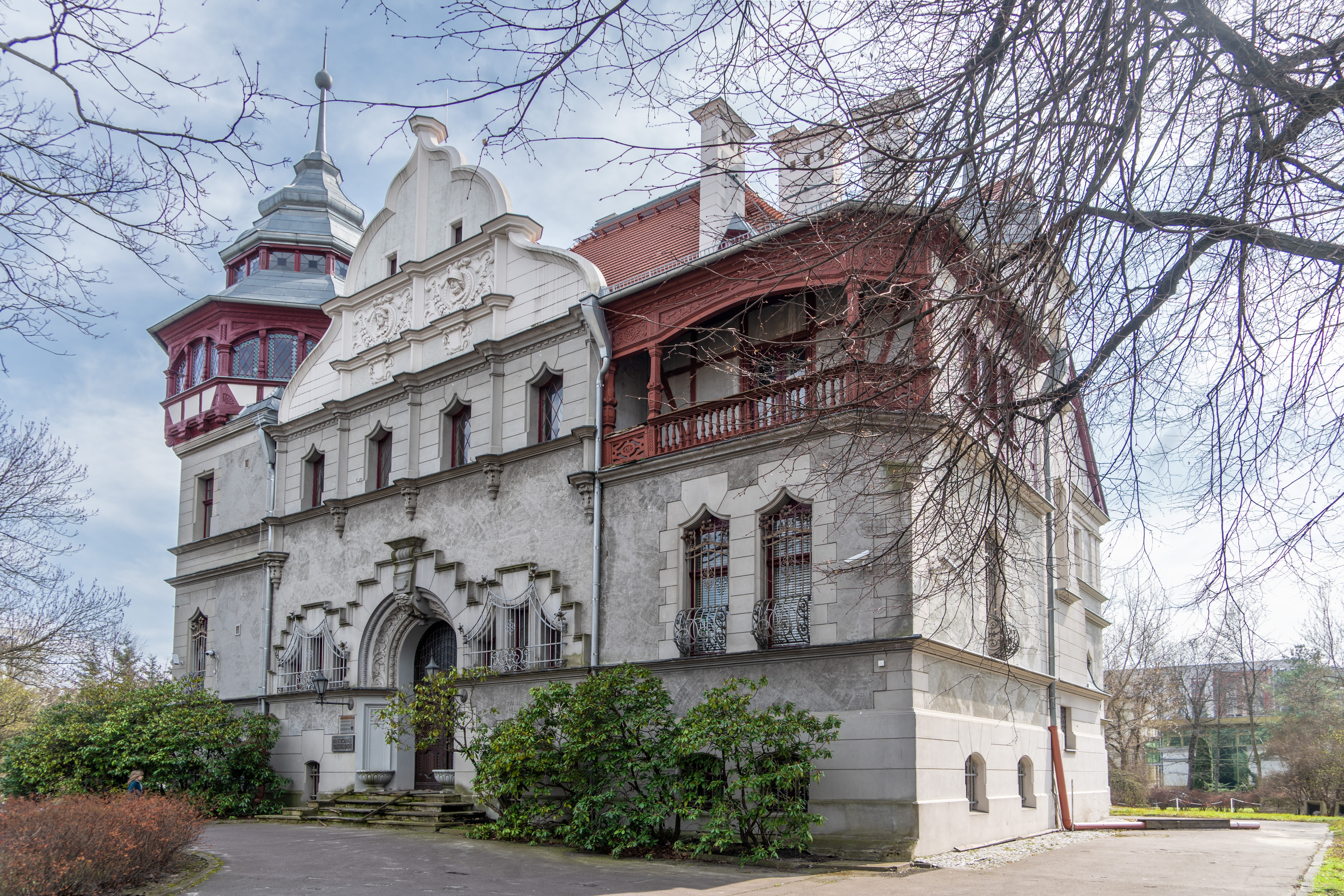
Former The Rector's Office of Lodz University of Technology in Reinhold Richter Villa

Łódź University of Technology (Polish: Politechnika Łódzka, lit. 'Łódź Polytechnic') was created in 1945 and has developed into one of the biggest technical universities in Poland. Originally located in an old factory building, today it covers nearly 200,000 sq. meters in over 70 separate buildings, the majority of which are situated in the main University area. As of 2018, around 15,000 students studied at the university. The educational and scientific tasks of the university are carried out by about 3,000 staff members.

University rankings

Global – Overall
- THE World: 1001+ (2020)

== Faculties ==
=== Faculty of Mechanical Engineering ===
The Faculty of Mechanical Engineering is one of the first departments of the Lodz University of Technology conducting research activity and teaching. The Faculty offers full-time, part-time, doctoral and postgraduate studies. It educates students in seven study areas being part of technical sciences, both full-time and part-time.

Organizational units

The faculty comprises 3 institutes and 6 departments:

- Institute of Materials Science and Engineering
- Institute of Machine Tools and Production Engineering
- Institute of Turbomachinery
- Department of Vehicles and Fundamentals of Machine Design
- Department of Strength of Materials
- Department of Dynamics
- Department of Manufacturing Engineering
- Department of Automation, Biomechanics and Mechatronics
- Department of Materials Engineering and Production Systems

Fields of study

The Faculty of Mechanical Engineering offers full-time and part-time, first and second cycle studies in seven fields of study:

- Automation and Robotics
- Energy
- Mechanical Engineering
- Mechatronics
- Materials Engineering
- Production Engineering
- Transportation

The faculty also offers third cycle studies in the following fields of study:

- Construction and Operation of Machines
- Mechanics
- Materials Engineering

=== Faculty of Electrical, Electronic, Computer and Control Engineering ===
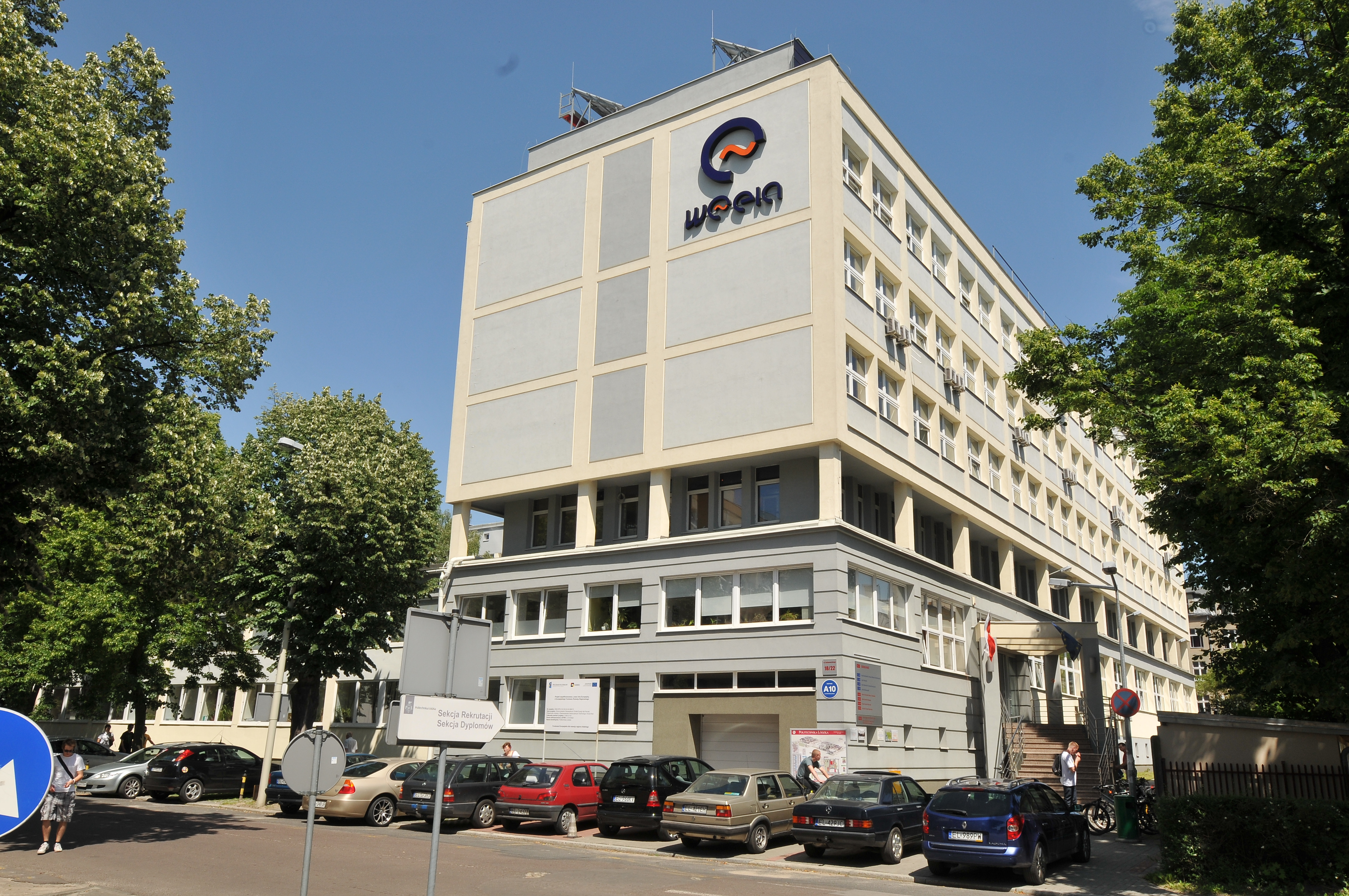
Faculty of Electrical, Electronic, Computer and Control Engineering

The Faculty of Electrical, Electronic, Computer and Control Engineering is one of the largest faculties of Lodz University of Technology. It came into existence in 1945. The faculty educates students in the fields of Automation and Robotics, Electronics and Telecommunications, Electrical Engineering, Power Engineering, Information Technology, Occupational Safety Engineering, Biomedical Engineering, Mechatronics and Transport.

Organisational units

The faculty comprises the following units:

- Institute of Electrical Engineering Systems
- Institute of Automatic Control
- Institute of Mechatronics and Information Systems
- Institute of Electrical Power Engineering
- Institute of Electronics
- Institute of Applied Computer Science
- Department of Electrical Apparatus
- Department of Microelectronics and Computer Science
- Department of Semiconductors and Optoelectric Devices

Fields of study

The Faculty of Electrical, Electronic, Computer and Control Engineering offers full-time and part-time, first and second cycle studies in the following fields of study:

- Automation and Robotics
- Electronic and Telecommunication Engineering (both in Polish and English)
- Electrical Engineering
- Power Engineering
- Information Technology (in Polish and English)
- Computer Science (in Polish and English)
- Data Science (in English only)
- Occupational Safety Engineering
- Biomedical Engineering (in Polish and English)
- Mechatronics
- Transport

The faculty also offers postgraduate courses and trainings for persons who want to improve their skills.

=== Faculty of Chemistry ===
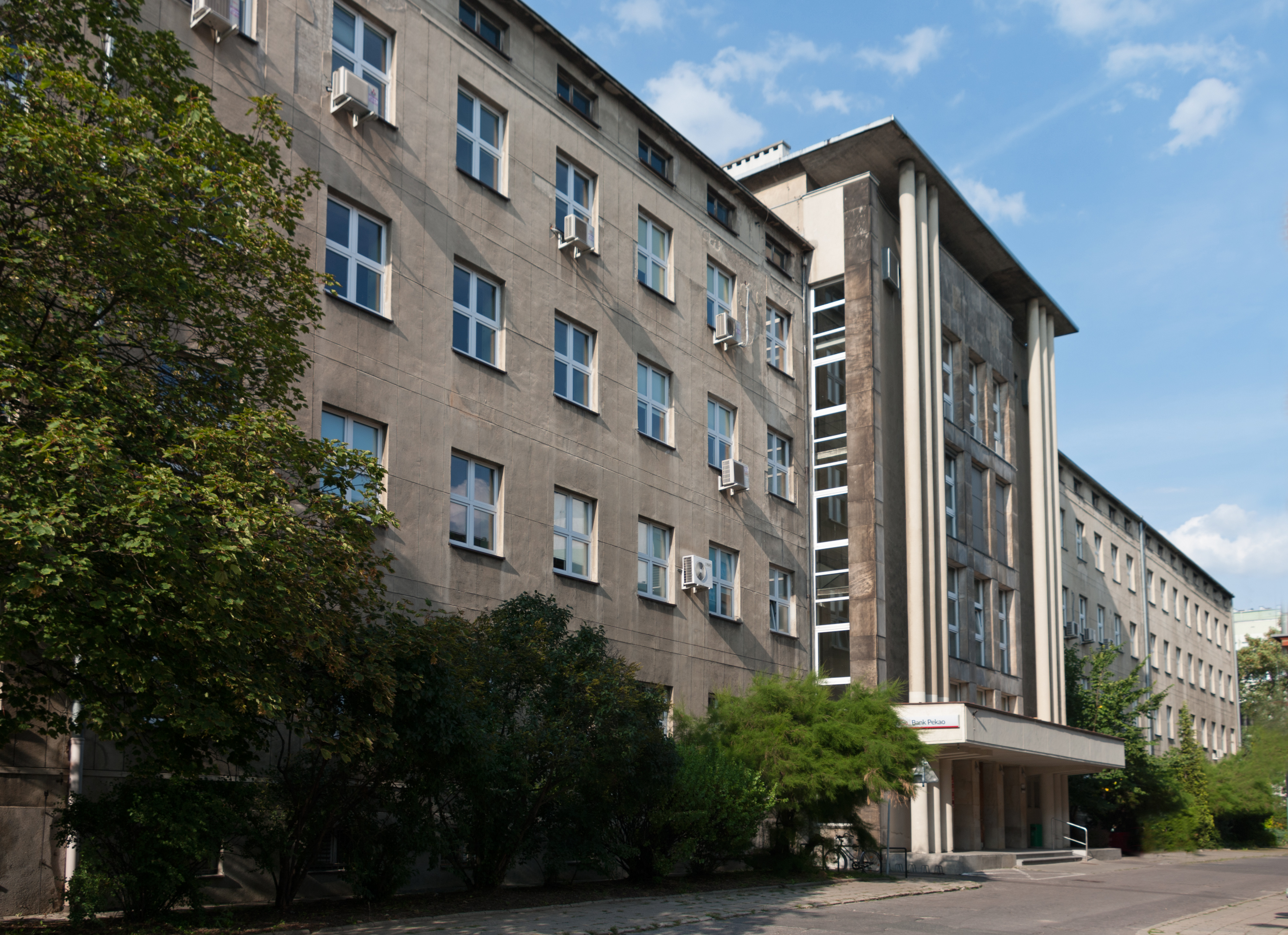
Faculty of Chemistry

The Faculty of Chemistry is one of the faculties of Lodz University of Technology educating in the field of chemical science and technology.

Organizational units

- Institute of General and Ecological Chemistry
- Institute of Organic Chemistry
- Institute of Applied Radiation Chemistry
- Institute of Polymer and Dye Technology
- Department of Molecular Physics

Fields of study

The faculty offers the following full-time studies:

- Analytical Chemistry - first cycle studies
- Chemistry – first and second cycle studies
- Chemistry of Building Materials (since 2011 in cooperation with AGH University of Science and Technology in Cracow and Gdańsk University of Technology), first and second cycle studies
- Chemistry in Forensics - second cycle studies
- Chemical Technology – first and second cycle studies
- Information Technology in Environmental Protection - first cycle studies
- Nanotechnology – first and second cycle studies
- Technologies of modern functional materials - second cycle studies

Previously offered full-time studies:

- Chemistry and Special Purpose Material Engineering (since March 2015, interdisciplinary, the field shared with the second degree studies of the Faculty of Chemistry of Adam Mickiewicz University in Poznań and the Department of New Technologies and Chemistry at Military University of Technology in Warsaw)
- Environmental Protection – first cycle studies

The Faculty of Chemistry also offers postgraduate courses on Nuclear Energy and Radiation Safety.

=== Faculty of Textiles and Design ===
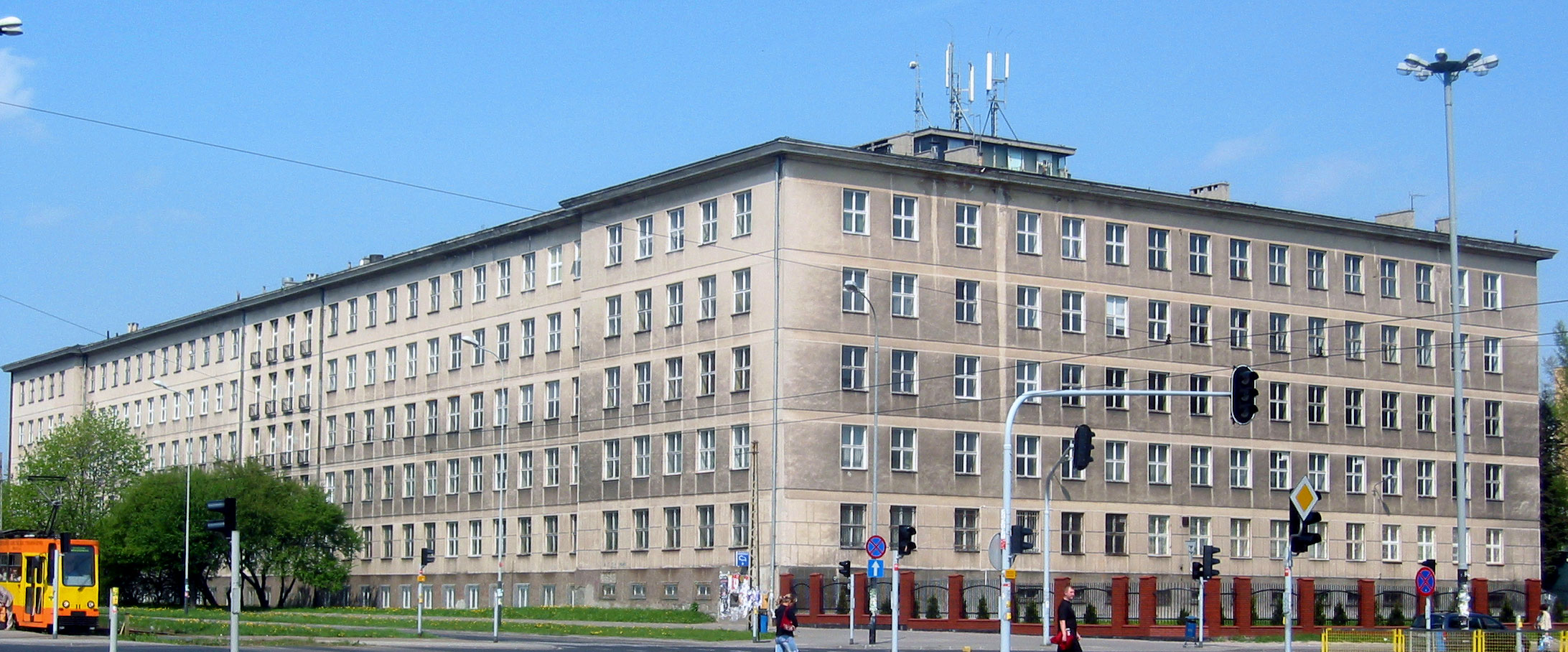
Faculty of Textiles and Design

Organizational units

- Institute of Architecture of Textiles
- Department of Design Theory and Textile Design History
- Department of Woven Fabrics
- Department of Visual Arts
- Department of Clothing Technology and Textronics
- Department of Man-Made Fibres
- Department of Knitting Technology
- Department of Material and Commodity Sciences and Textile Metrology
- Department of Material and Commodity Sciences and Textile Metrology
- Department of Physical Chemistry of Polymers
- Department of Yarn, Non-Woven Fabrics and Fibriform Composites Technology
- Department of Technical Mechanics and Computer Engineering
- Department of Textile Machine Mechanics

Fields of study

The faculty offers the following full-time courses in 5 fields of study:

- Education of Technology and Information Engineering (1st cycle studies; 2nd cycle studies)
- Material Engineering (1st cycle studies; 2nd cycle studies)
- Occupational Health (1st cycle studies)
- Textile Engineering (1st cycle studies; 2nd cycle studies)
- Pattern Design (1st cycle studies; 2nd cycle studies)

The faculty also offers the following postgraduate courses:

- Postgraduate Studies in Science of Commodities– 1 year (2 semesters)
- Postgraduate Studies “Occupational Health”– 1 year (2 semesters)
- Inter-faculty Postgraduate Studies in Biomaterial Engineering – 1 year (2 semesters)
- Postgraduate Studies in Clothing Technology– 1,5 year (3 semesters)
- Postgraduate Studies in Fashion and Design "Université de la Mode"– 2 years (4 semesters)

The Faculty provides full-time PhD courses lasting 4 years in the field of textile mechanical engineering and textile chemical engineering.

=== Faculty of Biotechnology and Food Sciences ===
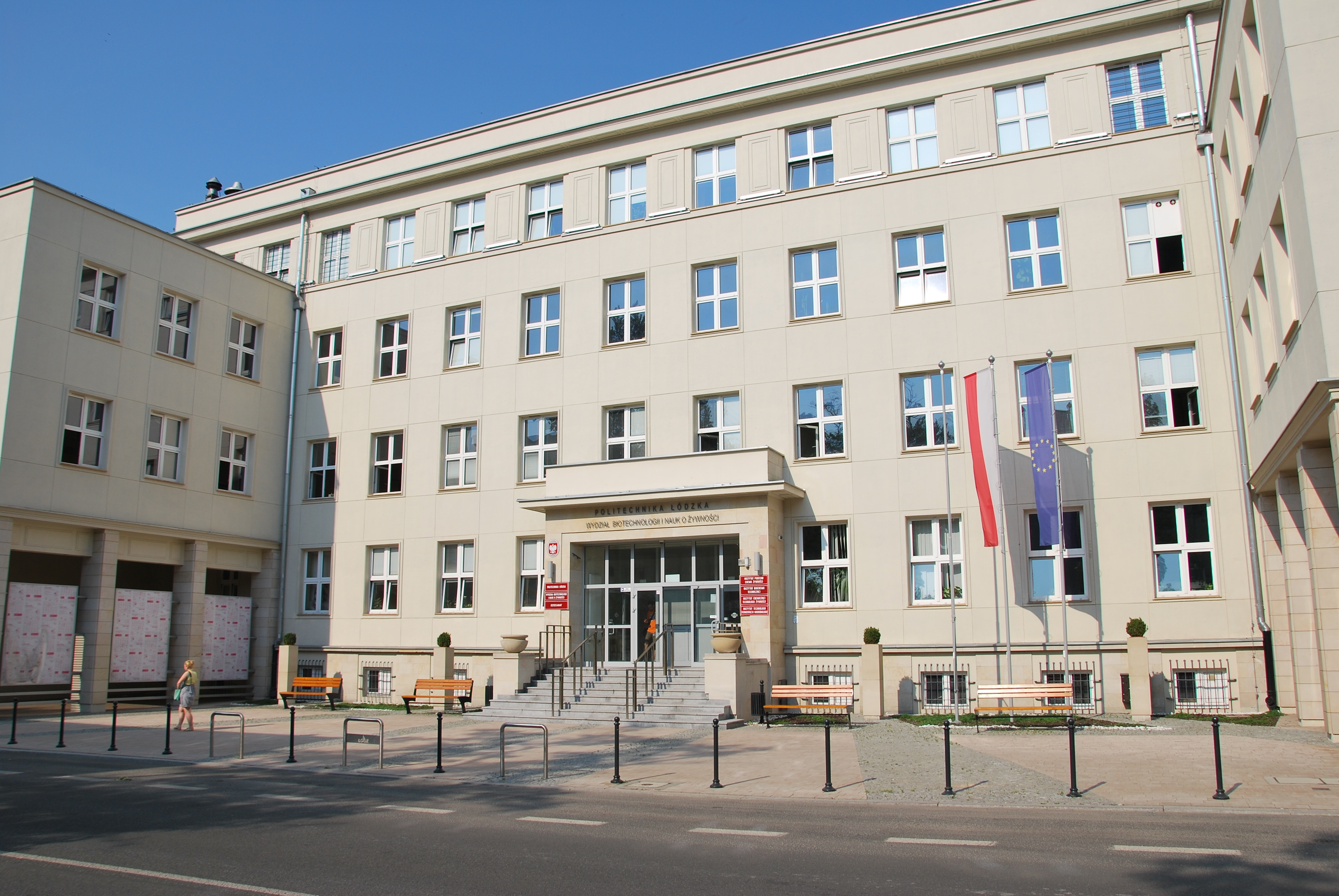
Faculty of Biotechnology and Food Sciences

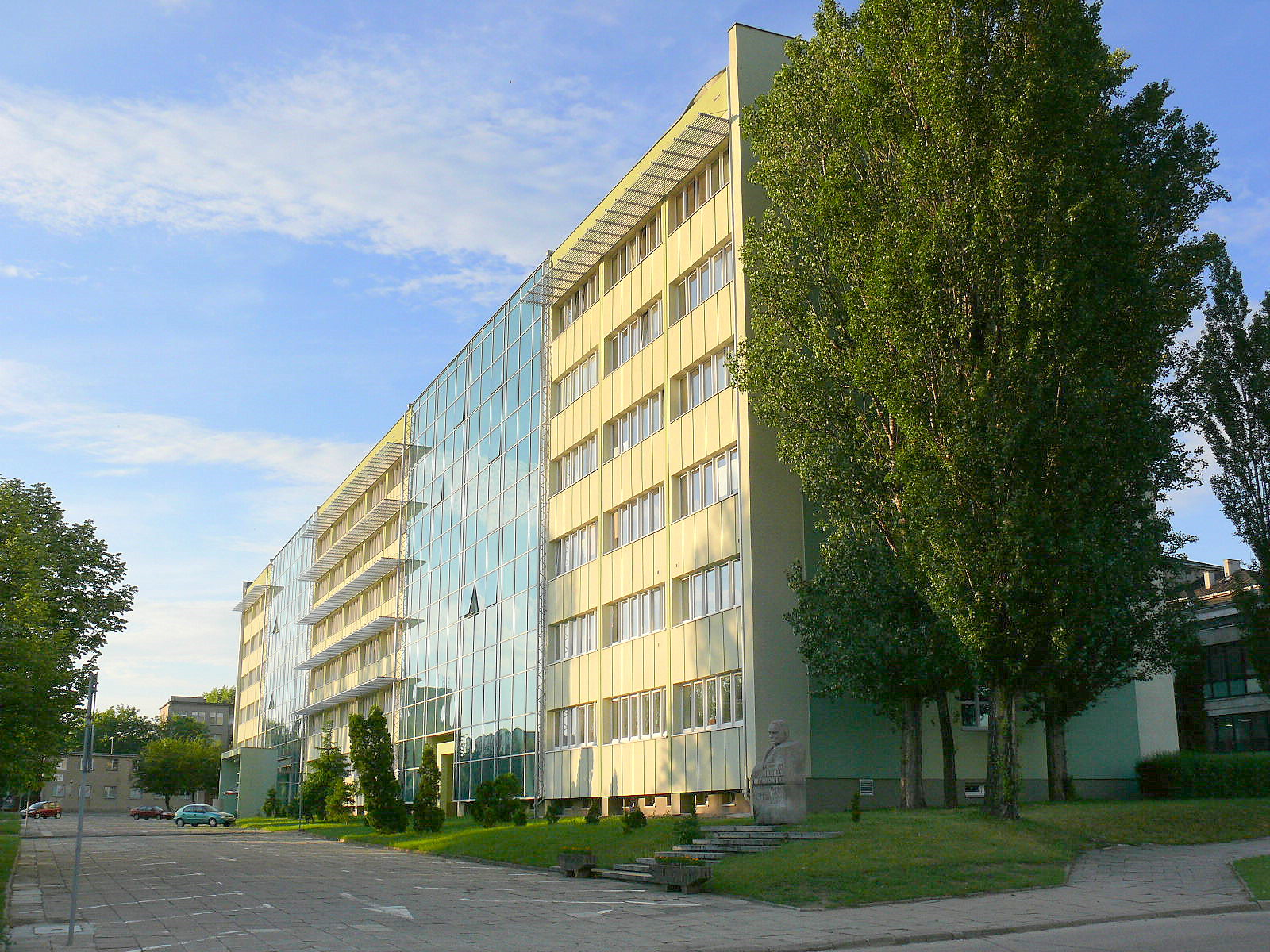
Faculty of Biotechnology and Food Sciences

The Faculty of Biotechnology and Food Sciences is an interdisciplinary faculty where the conducted research is related to chemistry, engineering and biology. It is one of the most unusual faculties at Polish technical universities.

Organizational units

- Institute of General Food Chemistry
  - Food and Environmental Analysis
  - Chemical Biophysics
  - Bioorganic Chemistry and Cosmetic Raw Materials
  - Analytical and Bioinorganic Chemistry
- Institute of Technical Biochemistry
- Institute of Chemical Technology of Food
  - Department of Technology of Sugar Production
  - Department of Technology of Confectionery and Starch
  - Department of Technology of Food Refrigeration
  - Department of Food Analysis and Technology
  - Sugar Technology Laboratory
  - Quality Management
- Institute of Fermentation Technology and Microbiology
  - Department of Technical Microbiology
  - Department of Technology of Fermentation
  - Department of Technology of Spirit and Yeast

Fields of study

The faculty offers education in the following fields:

- Biotechnology
- Environmental Protection
- Food Science and Nutrition
- Environmental Biotechnology

The faculty, together with IFE (International Faculty of Engineering), offers first and second cycle full-time studies in biotechnology in English.

=== Faculty of Civil Engineering, Architecture and Environmental Engineering ===
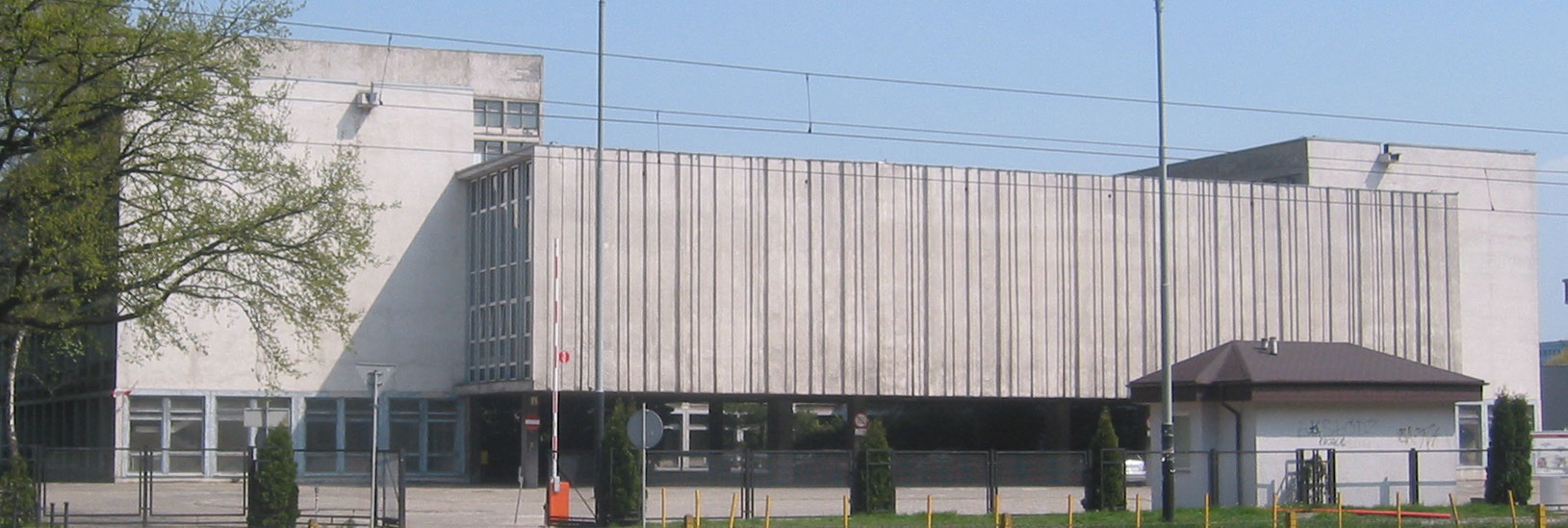
Faculty of Civil Engineering, Architecture and Environmental Engineering

The Faculty of Civil Engineering, Architecture and Environmental Engineering is one of the departments of Lodz University of Technology educating in the following fields: architecture and urban planning, construction, engineering and environmental protection. It was established on May 11, 1956.

Organisational units

The faculty consists of two institutes and six departments:

- Institute of Architecture and Urban Planning
- Institute of Environmental Engineering and Building Installations
- Department of Mechanics of Materials
- Department of Building Physics and Building Materials
- Department of Structural Mechanics
- Department of Concrete Structures
- Department of Geotechnics and Engineering Structures
- Department of Geodesy, Environmental Cartography and Descriptive Geometry

Fields of study

The faculty offers full-time and part-time studies in the following fields of study:

- Construction
- Architecture and Urban Planning
- Environmental Engineering
- Spatial Economy

The faculty also offers third cycle studies.

=== Faculty of Technical Physics, Information Technology and Applied Mathematics ===
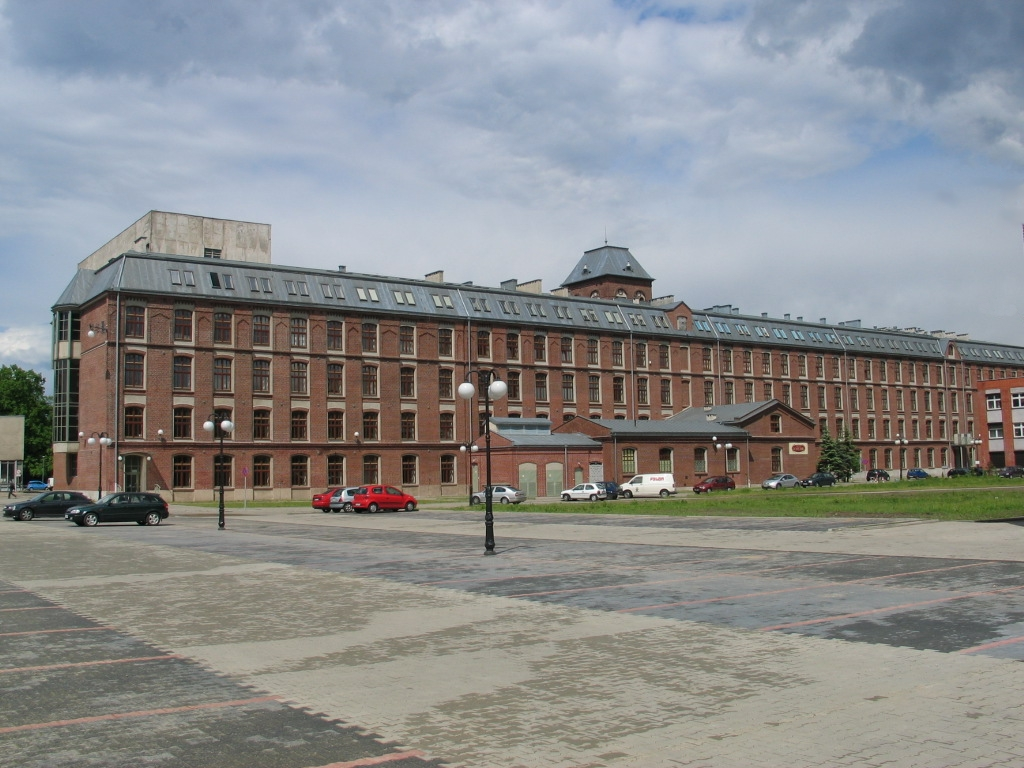
Faculty of Technical Physics, Information Technology and Applied Mathematics

The Faculty of Technical Physics, Computer Science and Applied Mathematics is one of the nine of faculties of Lodz University of Technology. It was established in 1976.

Organisational units

The faculty comprises the following units:

- Institute of Computer Science:
  - Department of Intelligent Systems and Software Engineering
  - Department of Computer Graphics and Multimedia
  - Department of Systems and Information Technology
- Institute of Mathematics
  - Department of Mathematical Modelling
  - Department of Contemporary Applied Mathematical Analysis
  - Department of Insurance and Capital Markets
- Institute of Physics

Fields of study

The faculty offers full-time and part-time, first and second cycle studies in the following fields of study:

- Technical Physics
- Information Technology
- Mathematics

=== Faculty of Management and Production Engineering ===
The Faculty of Management and Production Engineering offers education in the field of organization and management combined with technical sciences, adopting a practical approach.

Organizational units

- Department of Management
- Department of Production Management and Logistics
- Department of European Integration and International Marketing
- Department of Management Systems and Innovation
- Institute of Social Sciences and Management of Technologies

Fields of study

The Faculty of Management and Production Engineering offers the following fields of study:

- Management
- Management Engineering
- Management and Production Engineering
- Business and Technology - in English and French
- Occupational Safety Engineering
- Logistics
- Paper Production and Printing

=== Faculty of Process and Environmental Engineering ===
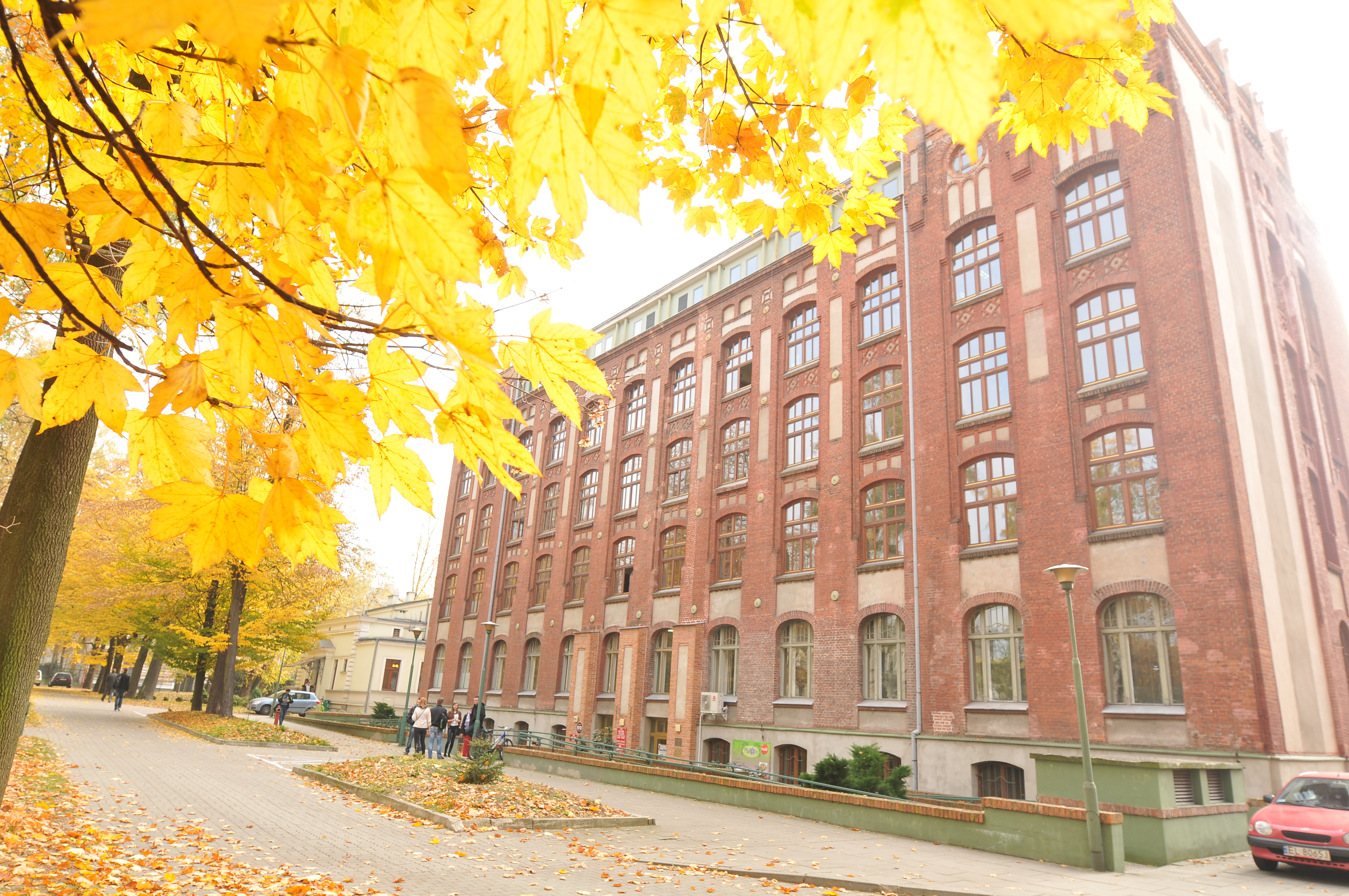
Faculty of Process and Environmental Engineering

The Faculty of Process and Environmental Engineering is an organizational unit of TUL conducting research and teaching.

Organizational units

- Department of Process Equipment
- Department of Chemical Engineering
- Department of Bioprocess Engineering
- Department of Process Thermodynamics
- Department of Numerical Modelling
- Department of Safety Engineering
- Department of Molecular Engineering
- Department of Environmental Engineering
- Department of Heat and Mass Transfer
- Department of Environmental Engineering Techniques

Fields of study

The faculty offers four areas of study:

- Biochemical Engineering (first cycle, full-time studies)
- Process Engineering (first and second cycle studies, full-time studies)
- Environmental Engineering (first and second cycle studies, full-time and part-time studies)
- Occupational Safety Engineering (first cycle studies, full-time and part-time studies)

The faculty also conducts studies of the third degree (PhD) lasting four years in full-time in the field of Chemical Engineering in Environmental Protection. Doctoral programmes prepare students to obtain a doctoral degree in the field of environmental engineering or chemical engineering.

The faculty offers the following postgraduate courses:

- Safety and Occupational Health
- Safety of Industrial Processes
- Management of Municipal Waste

=== International Faculty of Engineering ===
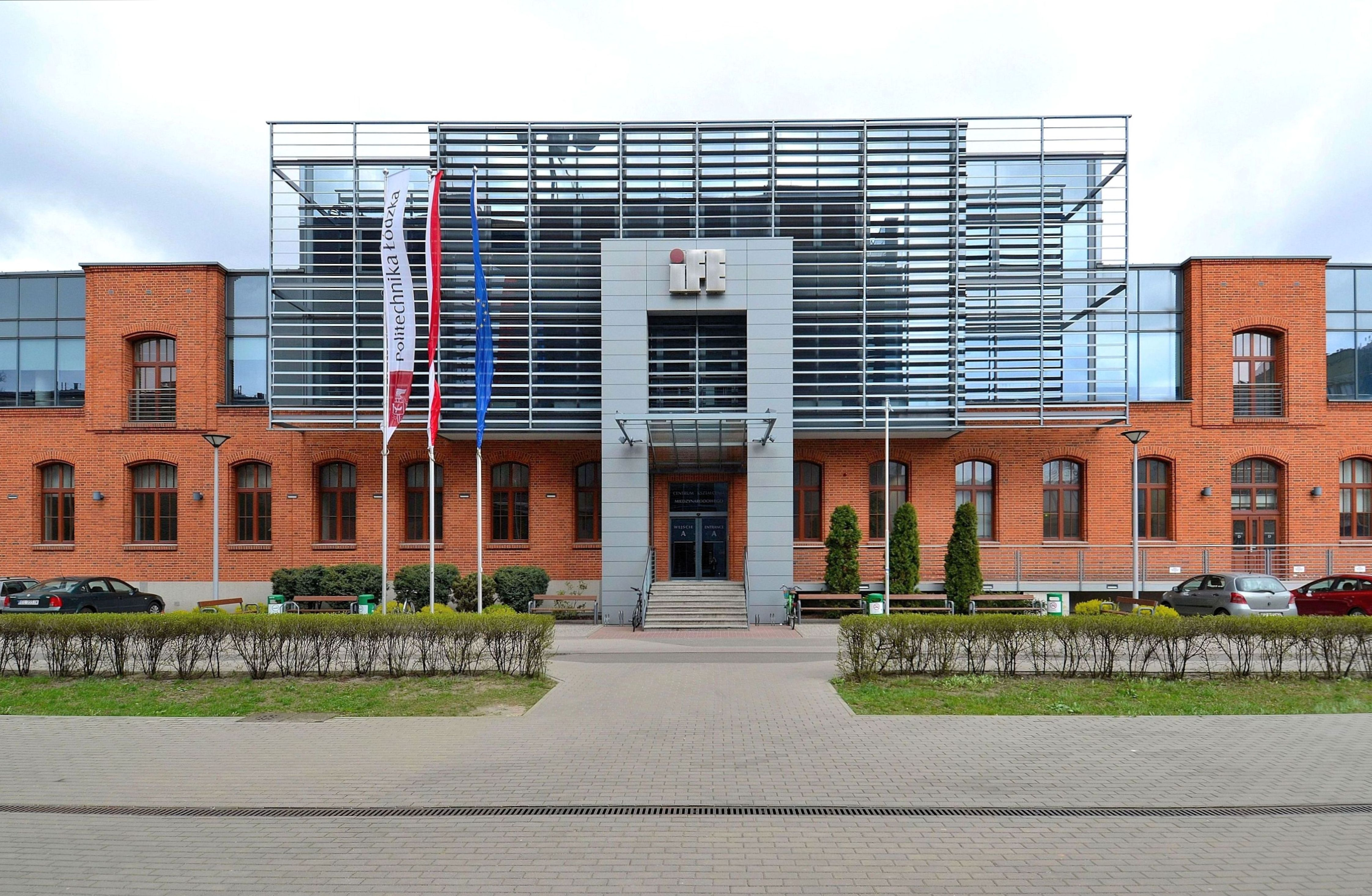
International Faculty of Engineering of TUL

International Faculty of Engineering (IFE) is an interfaculty unit offering education in foreign languages (English and French) under the auspices of TUL.

IFE students can participate in numerous courses with English as a language of instruction and 1 offered in French:

- Advanced Biobased and Bioinspired Materials (ABIOM) – in cooperation with the Faculty of Chemistry
- Biomedical Engineering and Technologies (BET) - in cooperation with the Faculty of Electrical, Electronic, Computer and Control Engineering
- Biotechnology (BIO) – in cooperation with the Faculty of Biotechnology and Food Sciences
- Business and Technology (BT) – in cooperation with the Faculty of Organization and Management
- Business Studies (BS) - in cooperation with the Faculty of Organization and Management
- Computer Science (CS) – in cooperation with the Faculty of Electrical, Electronic, Computer and Control Engineering
- Electronic and Telecommunication Engineering (ETE) – in cooperation with the Faculty of Electrical, Electronic, Computer and Control Engineering
- Gestion et Technologie (GT) - in cooperation with the Faculty of Organization and Management
- Industrial Biotechnology (IB) - in cooperation with the Faculty of Biotechnology and Food Sciences
- Information Technology (IT) – in cooperation with the Faculty of Technical Physics, Computer Science and Applied Mathematics
- Mathematical Methods in Data Analysis (MMDA) - in cooperation with the Faculty of Technical Physics, Computer Science and Applied Mathematics
- Mechanical Engineering (ME) – in cooperation with the Faculty of Mechanical Engineering
- Modelling and Data Science (MDS) - in cooperation with the Faculty of Technical Physics, Computer Science and Applied Mathematics

== Foreign Language Centre ==
Foreign Language Centre of Lodz University of Technology
- Centrum Językowe Politechniki Łódzkiej
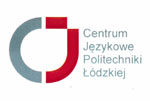
- Established: 1951
- Parent institution: Lodz University of Technology
- Students: 6273
- Location: Politechniki 12, 90-924 Łódź, Łódź, Poland
- Website: cj.p.lodz.pl/index.php/en/about

The Foreign Language Centre of Lodz University of Technology was established in 1951. Since 2005, it has been located in a former factory building on Aleja Politechniki 12 in Łódź. The building was modernized and furnished with new facilities with the aid of the European Regional Development Fund (March 2004 – January 2006). The centre has 28 classrooms, a conference room and a library, and is the seat of the University of the Third Age of Lodz University of Technology. As of 2013, the Centre employed 72 academic teachers and 15 administrative, technical and maintenance employees.

Languages taught at the Centre include English, German, Russian, Italian, French, Spanish and Polish for foreigners. In 2013, there were 6273 students learning at the centre. English courses comprised 89% of all the classes. The centre conducts classes for first- and second-degree, as well as doctoral students in accordance with the university curriculum, for participants in Socrates-Erasmus and IAESTE programs, students of the General Secondary School of TUL, students of the University of the Third Age of TUL, foreign exchange students from Cangzhou Vocational College of Technology (China) and foreigners who want to study at TUL.

The centre is taking part in a program organized by the City of Lodz Office called “Młodzi w Łodzi – Językowzięci”, the aim of which is to promote learning languages that are less popular in Poland and to encourage students and graduates from Łódź to improve their language qualifications. As part of the program, courses of the Finnish, Danish and Swedish language are conducted at the centre. Academic teachers employed at the centre also teach at the International Faculty of Engineering. The centre is also an examination centre for the international examinations TELC, LCCI and BULATS.

== Other Units ==
- Library of Lodz University of Technology
- Centre of Mathematics and Physics
- Institute of Papermaking and Printing
- Computer Center
- Laser Diagnostic and Therapy Center
- Lodz Children University

== Rectors ==
1. Bohdan Stefanowski (1945–1948)
2. Osman Achmatowicz (1948–1952)
3. Bolesław Konorski (1952–1953)
4. Mieczysław Klimek (1953–1962)
5. Jerzy Werner (1962–1968)
6. Mieczysław Serwiński (1968–1975)
7. Edward Galas (1975–1981)
8. Jerzy Kroh (1981–1987)
9. Czesław Strumiłło (1987–1990)
10. Jan Krysiński (1990–1996)
11. Józef Mayer (1996–2002)
12. Jan Krysiński (2002–2008)
13. Stanisław Bielecki (2008–2016)
14. Sławomir Wiak (2016–2020)
15. Krzysztof Jóźwik (2020–)

Joseph Richter Villa is used as the seat of the rector's administration.

== Notable alumni ==
- Henryk Bem (born 1940), professor, radiochemist, and Dean of the Faculty of Chemistry
- Krzysztof Matyjaszewski (born 1950), Polish-American chemist, winner of Wolf Prize in Chemistry
- Andrzej Górak (born 1951), process engineer
- Hanna Zdanowska (born 1959), politician, Mayor of Łódź
- Dariusz Joński (born 1979), politician
- Sławosz Uznański-Wiśniewski (born 1984), engineer working at CERN and ESA astronaut
- Adam Kszczot (born 1989), middle-distance runner
- Karolina Bielawska (born 1999), model and beauty pageant titleholder, winner of Miss World 2021
- Professor Tomasz Kubiak , Mechanical engineer, alumni and staff.
