= Garuk-e Pain =

Garuk-e Pain گروك پائين
- Village
- Location within Iran
- Coordinates: 25°51′53″N 57°25′42″E
- Country: Iran
- Province: Hormozgan
- County: Jask
- Bakhsh: Central
- Rural District: Kangan

Population (2006)
  - Total: 167
- Time zone: UTC+3:30 (IRST)
  - Summer (DST): UTC+4:30 (IRDT)

Garuk-e Pain (Persian: گروك پائين, also Romanized as Garūk-e Pā’īn; also known as Garak-e Pā’īn and Garūk-e Soflá) is a village in Kangan Rural District, in the Central District of Jask County, Hormozgan Province, Iran. At the 2006 census, its population was 167, in 31 families.
