= Garuk-e Bala =

Garuk-e Bala گروك بالا
- Village
- Location within Iran
- Coordinates: 25°53′03″N 57°25′21″E
- Country: Iran
- Province: Hormozgan
- County: Jask
- Bakhsh: Central
- Rural District: Kangan

Population (2006)
  - Total: 211
- Time zone: UTC+3:30 (IRST)
  - Summer (DST): UTC+4:30 (IRDT)

Garuk-e Bala (Persian: گروك بالا, also Romanized as Garūk-e Bālā; also known as Garak-e Bālā, Garok-e Bālā, and Garūk-e ‘Olyā) is a village in Kangan Rural District, in the Central District of Jask County, Hormozgan Province, Iran. At the 2006 census, its population was 211, in 42 families.
